= Sri Pravarasena =

Alchon Huns King

- Ruler of the Alchon Huns
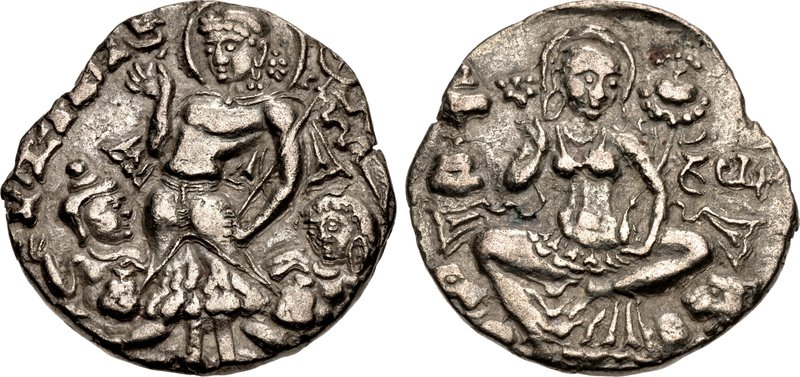
- Coinage of Pravarasena, supposed founder of Srinagar. Obverse: Standing king with two figured seated below. Name "Pravarasena". Reverse: goddess seated on a lion. Legend "Kidāra". c. 6th-early 7th century CE. Approximate location of Sri Pravarasena's territory
- Reign: 530–590
- Predecessor: Mihirakula
- Successor: Gokarna
- Religion: Shaivism

Sri Pravarasena (reigned c. 530-590 CE), also sometimes Pravarasena II based on the regnal lists of the Rajatarangini, was a 6th-century Huna king of the Alchon Huns in the area of Gandhara and Kashmir in northwestern India. His reign probably lasted about 60 years from about the year 530 CE.

According to Kalhana's 12th century text Rajatarangini, a king named Pravarasena II established a new capital named Pravarapura (also known as Pravarasena-pura). Based on topographical details, Pravarapura appears to be same as the modern city of Srinagar. Aurel Stein dates the king to 6th century. He also built a temple named "Pravaresha".

Sri Pravarasena is thought as the most likely ruler to have succeeded the Alchon Huns ruler Mihirakula in the area of Kashmir Gandhara, and he would have been the son of Toramana.

Pravarasena was probably succeeded by a king named Gokarna, a follower of Shiva, and then by his son king Narendraditya Khinkhila. The son of Narendraditya was Yudhishthira, last known ruler of the Alchon Huns.
