= Alchon Huns =

370–670 CE nomadic people who invaded India

- 370–670
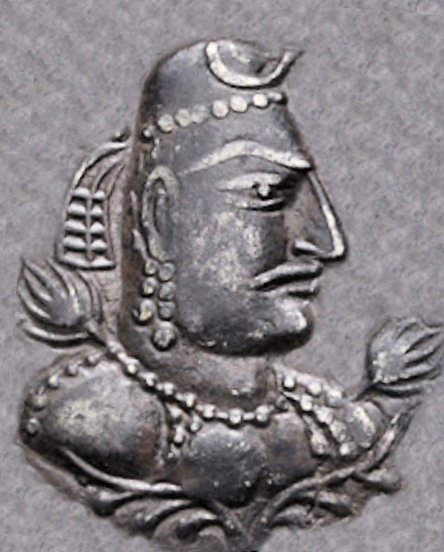
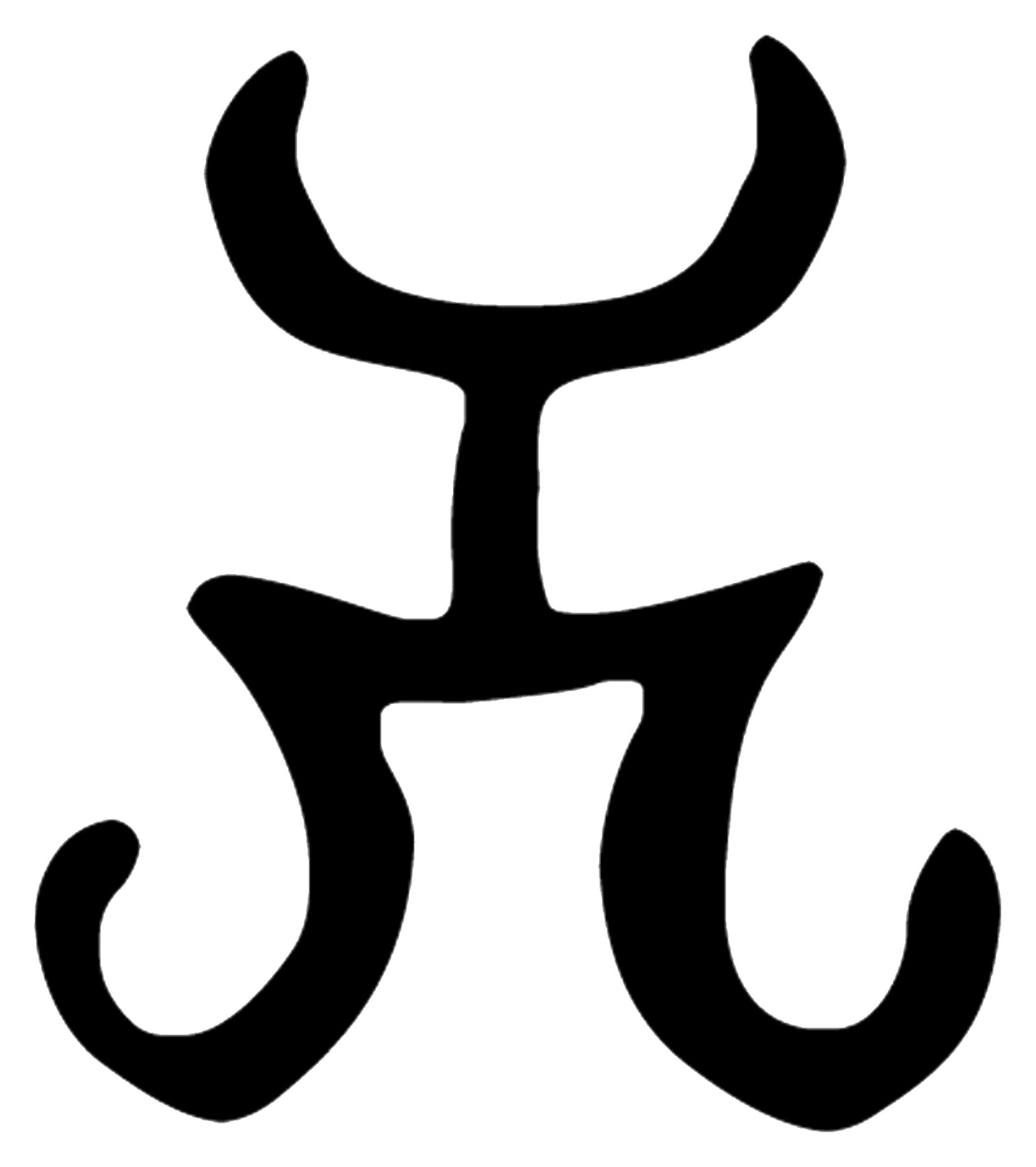
- Portrait of Alchon king Khingila (c. 450 CE), and the bull/lunar tamga of the Alchon (known as Tamgha S1), as visible on Alchon coinage.

- Find spots of epigraphic inscriptions (red dots) indicating local control by the Alchon Huns in India between 500-530 CE, with neighbouring polities, and territorial extent of the Alchon Huns (brown).
- Capital: Kapisa; Udabhanda; Sagala
- Common languages: Bactrian (written)
- Religion: Hinduism; Buddhism; Zoroastrianism
- Government: Nomadic empire
- Historical era: Late antiquity
  - Established: 370
  - Disestablished: 670
- Currency: Drachm
Preceded by
Sassanian Empire
Kidarites
Gupta Empire
Succeeded by
Hephthalites
Nezak Huns
Turk Shahi
Second Aulikara dynasty
Karkota dynasty
Maukhari dynasty
Later Gupta dynasty
Kalachuris of Tripuri
- Today part of: Afghanistan; Pakistan; India

The Alchon Huns, (Bactrian: αλχον(ν)ο Alkhon(n)o or αλχαν(ν)ο Alkhan(n)o) also known as the Alkhan, Alchono, Alxon, Alkhon, Alakhana, and Walxon, were a nomadic people who established states in Central Asia and the Indian subcontinent during the 4th and 6th centuries CE. They were first mentioned as being located in Paropamisus, and later expanded south-east, into the Punjab and Central India, going as far as Eran and Kausambi. The Alchon invasion of the Indian subcontinent eradicated the Kidarite Huns who had preceded them by about a century, and contributed to the fall of the Gupta Empire, in a sense bringing an end to Classical India.

The invasion of India by the Huna peoples follows invasions of the subcontinent in the preceding centuries by the Yavana (Indo-Greeks), the Saka (Indo-Scythians), the Pahlava (Indo-Parthians), and the Kushana (Yuezhi). The Alchon Empire was the second of four major Huna states established in Central Asia and the Indian subcontinent. The Alchon were preceded by the Kidarites and succeeded by the Hephthalites and Nezak Huns in Bactria and the Hindu Kush respectively. The names of the Alchon kings are known from their extensive coinage, Buddhist accounts, and a number of commemorative inscriptions throughout the Indian subcontinent.

The Alchons have long been considered a part or a sub-division of the Hephthalites, or as their eastern branch, but are now regarded as a separate entity.

== Identity ==
=== Name ===
The etymology of "Alchon" is disputed. It is only attested on the script of their coins and seals, where it appears as alkhon(n)o or alkhan(n)o in Bactrian script or lakhāna in Sanskrit. Frantz Grenet, pointing to the Middle Persian apocalyptic book Zand-i Wahman yasn, argued that a name attested there, Karmīr Xyōn ("red Chionites") could represent a translation of Alkhonno, with the first element, al being a Turkic word for red and the second element representing the ethnic name "Hun". An older suggestion, by H. Humbach, also connects the second element to "Hun", but argues that al- comes from the ethnic name Alan.

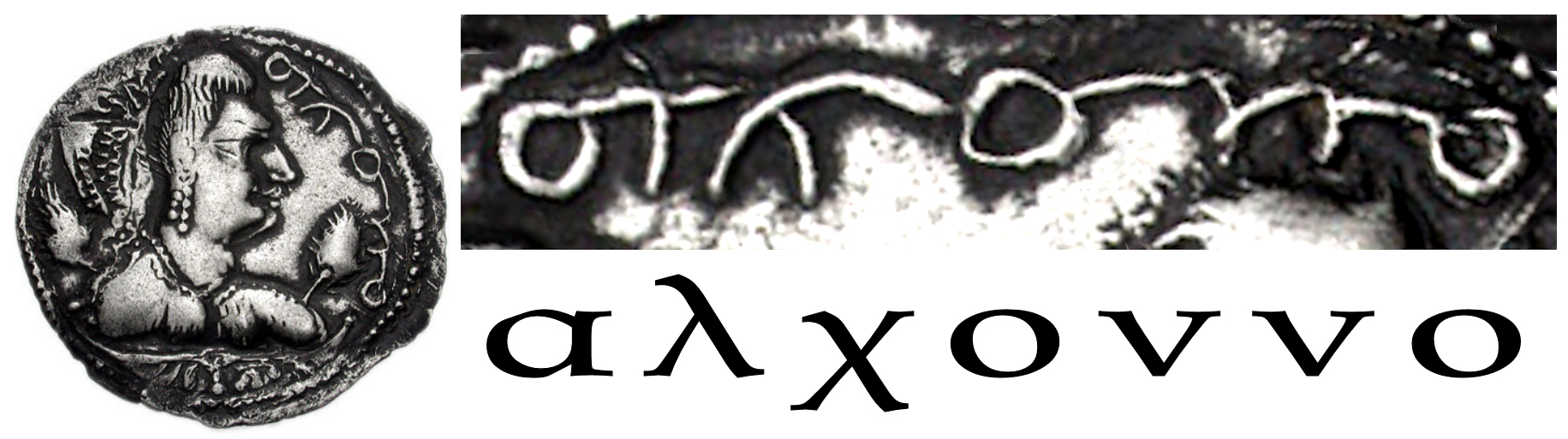
The word "Alchono" (αλχοννο) in Greek (Greco-Bactrian cursive script), on a coin of Khingila.

Hans Bakker argues that the second spelling -khan- makes it unlikely that the term contains the ethnic name "Hun", as the Bactrian word for "Hun" is *uono (plural uonono). Likewise, Khodadad Rezakhani argues that the name Alkhana is attested for a ruler in Western Kashmir, meaning it was probably initially a personal name. Bakker instead argues that the ethnic name has been used as a personal name. Furthermore, the “Red Huns” theory requires that the Alchon spoke a Turkic language, which is highly disputed. Agustí Alemanny similarly disputes Humbach's etymology as relying on insufficient evidence of an Alan-Hun ethnic group.

Because the name "Alchon" is only attested on coins and seals, there is some debate about whether the Alchon were a separate entity from the Hephthalites. To contemporaneous observers in India, the Alchon were one of the Hūṇa peoples (or Hunas). A seal from Kausambi associated with Toramana, bears the title Hūnarāja ("Huna King"), although the authenticity of this seal is questionable. Toramana is also described as a Huna ( Hūṇā) in the Rīsthal inscription.

The Hunas appear to have been the peoples known in contemporaneous Iranian sources as Xwn, Xiyon and similar names, which were later Romanised as Xionites or Chionites. The Hunas are often linked to the Huns that invaded Europe from Central Asia during the same period. Consequently, the word Hun has three slightly different meanings, depending on the context in which it is used: 1) the Huns of Europe; 2) groups associated with the Huna people who invaded northern India; 3) a vague term for Hun-like people. The Alchon have also been labelled "Huns", with essentially the second meaning, as well as elements of the third.

=== Visual appearance ===
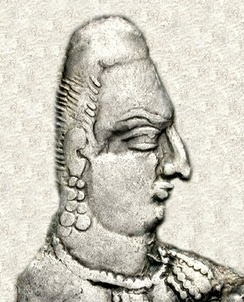
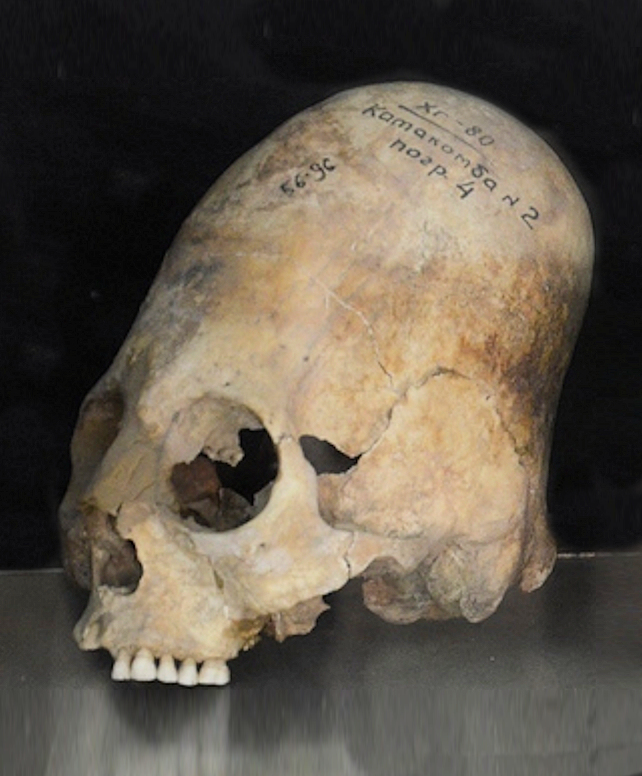
Left: Portrait of Alchon king Khingila, from his coinage (c. 450 CE). Right: Elongated skull excavated in Samarkand (dated 600-800 CE), Afrasiab Museum of Samarkand

The Alchons are generally recognised by their elongated skull, a result of artificial skull deformation, which may have represented their "corporate identity". The elongated skulls appear clearly in most of the portraits of rulers in the coinage of the Alkhon Huns, and most visibly on the coinage of Khingila. These elongated skulls, which they obviously displayed with pride, distinguished them from other peoples, such as their predecessors the Kidarites. On their coins, the spectacular skulls came to replace the Sasanian-type crowns which had been current in the coinage of the region. This practice is also known among other peoples of the steppes, particularly the Huns, and as far as Europe, where it was introduced by the Huns themselves.

In another ethnic custom, the Alchons were represented beardless, often wearing a moustache, in clear contrast with the Sasanian Empire prototype which was generally bearded.

The emblematic look of the Alchons seems to have become rather fashionable in the area, as shown by the depiction of the Iranian hero Rostam, mythical king of Zabulistan, with an elongated skull in his 7th century CE mural at Panjikent.

=== Symbolism ===
Another way for the Alchon Huns to affirm their identity and to differentiate themselves from their predecessors the Kidarites, was the use of a specific symbol, or tamgha, which regularly appears on their coinage and seals.

== History ==
=== Invasion of Bactria (370 CE) ===
The Alkhons are initially recorded in the area of Bactria circa 370 CE, from where they confronted the Sasanian Empire to the west and the Kidarites to the southeast.
Emergence of the Alchon tamgha
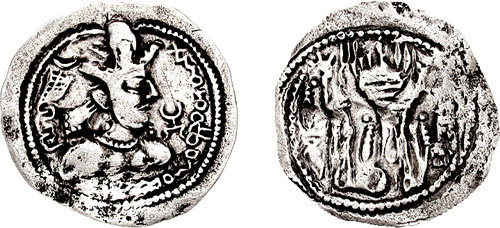
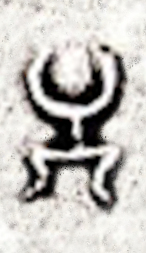
An early Alchon coin based on the design of Sasanian coinage, with bust imitating Sasanian king Shapur II (r.309 to 379 CE), only adding the Alchon Tamgha symbol and "Alchono" (αλχοννο) in Bactrian script on the obverse. Dated 400-440 CE.

During the reign of Shapur II, the Sasanian Empire and the Kushano-Sasanians gradually lost the control of Bactria to these invaders from Central Asia, first the Kidarites from around 335 CE, then the Alchon Huns from around 370 CE, who would follow up with the invasion of India a century later, and lastly the Hephthalites from around 450 CE.

Early confrontations between the Sasanian Empire of Shapur II with the nomadic hordes from Central Asia called the "Chionites" were described by Ammianus Marcellinus: he reports that in 356 CE, Shapur II was taking his winter quarters on his eastern borders, "repelling the hostilities of the bordering tribes" of the Chionites and the Euseni ("Euseni" is usually amended to "Cuseni", meaning the Kushans), finally making a treaty of alliance with the Chionites and the Gelani, "the most warlike and indefatigable of all tribes", in 358 CE. After concluding this alliance, the Chionites (probably of the Kidarites tribe) under their King Grumbates accompanied Shapur II in the war against the Romans, especially at the siege of Amida in 359 CE. Victories of the Xionites during their campaigns in the Eastern Caspian lands were also witnessed and described by Ammianus Marcellinus.

The Alchon Huns occupied Bactria circa 370 CE, chasing the Kidarites in the direction of India, and started minting coins in the style of Shapur II but bearing their name "Alchono".

=== Invasion of Kabulistan (c.385 CE) ===
Around 380-385 CE, the Alchons emerged in Kapisa, taking over Kabulistan from the Sassanian Persians, while at the same time the Kidarites (Red Huns) ruled in Gandhara. The Alchons are known to have reused the mint and the coin dies of Shapur II south of the Hindu Kush, again simply adding their name "Alchono" to Sasanian coinage. The Alchon Huns are sometimes said to have taken control of Kabul in 388.

=== Coinage ===
The Alchon Huns initially issued anonymous coins based on Sasanian designs. Several types of these coins are known, usually minted in Bactria, using Sasanian coinage designs with busts imitating Sasanian kings Shapur II (r.309 to 379 CE) and Shapur III (r.383 to 388 CE), adding the Alchon Tamgha and the name "Alchono" (αλχοννο) in Bactrian script (a slight adaptation of the Greek script which had been introduced in the region by the Greco-Bactrians in the 3rd century BCE) on the obverse, and with attendants to a fire altar, a standard Sasanian design, on the reverse. It is thought the Alchons took over the Sasanian mints in Kabulistan after 385 CE, reusing dies of Shapur II and Shapur III, to which they added the name "Alchono".

=== Gandhara (460 CE) ===
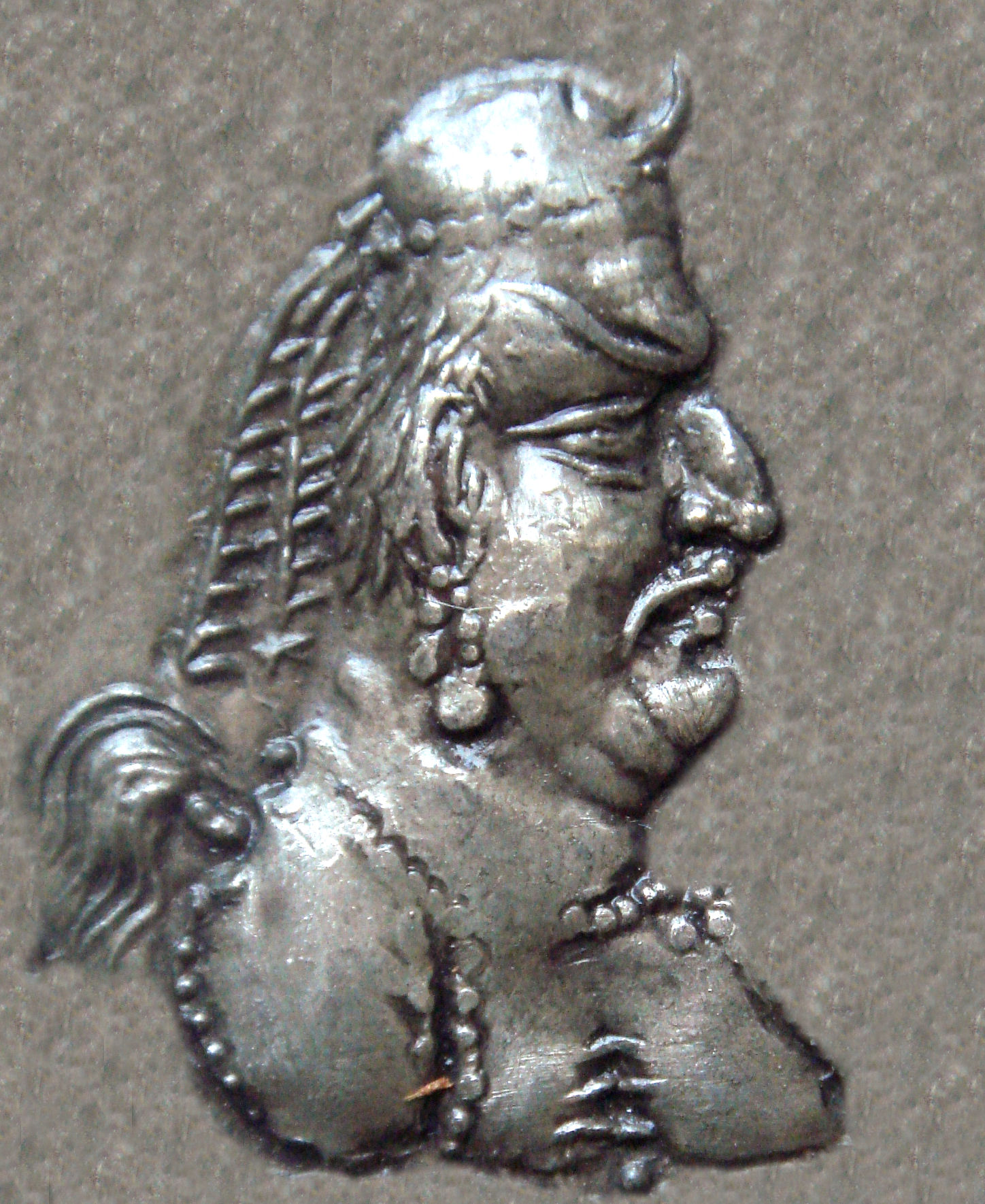
Portrait of an older King Khingila, founder of the Alchon Huns, on one of his coins, c. 430 – 490 CE.

Around 430 King Khingila, the most notable Alchon ruler, and the first one to be named and represented on his coins with the legend "χιγγιλο" (Chiggilo) in Bactrian, emerged and took control of the routes across the Hindu Kush from the Kidarites. Coins of the Alchons rulers Khingila and Mehama were found at the Buddhist monastery of Mes Aynak, southeast of Kabul, confirming the Alchon presence in this area around 450-500 CE. Khingila seems to have been a contemporary of the Sassanian ruler Bahram V. As the Alchons took control, diplomatic missions were established in 457 with China. Khingila, under the name Shengil, was called "King of India" in the Shahnameh of Ferdowsi.

Alchon ruler Mehama (r.461-493) was elevated to the position of Governor for Sasanian Emperor Peroz I (r. 459–484), and described himself as "King of the people of Kadag and governor of the famous and prosperous King of Kings Peroz" in a 462-463 letter. He allied with Peroz I in his victory over the Kidarites in 466 CE, and may also have helped him take the throne against his brother Hormizd III. But he was later able to wrestle autonomy or even independence.

Between 460 and 470 CE, the Alchons took over Gandhara and the Punjab which also had remained under the control of the Kidarites, while the Gupta Empire remained further east. The Alkhon Huns may simply have filled the power vacuum created by the decline of the Kidarites, following their defeat in India against the Gupta Empire of Skandagupta in 455 CE, and their subsequent defeat in 467 CE against the Sasanian Empire of Peroz I, with Hephthalite and Alchon aid under Mehama, which put an end to Kidarite rule in Transoxiana once and for all.

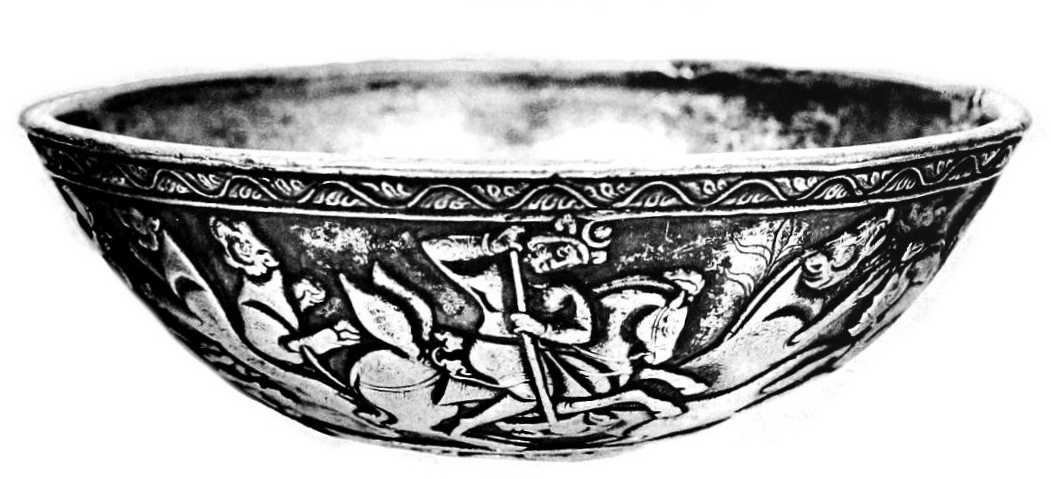
The silver bowl in the British Museum

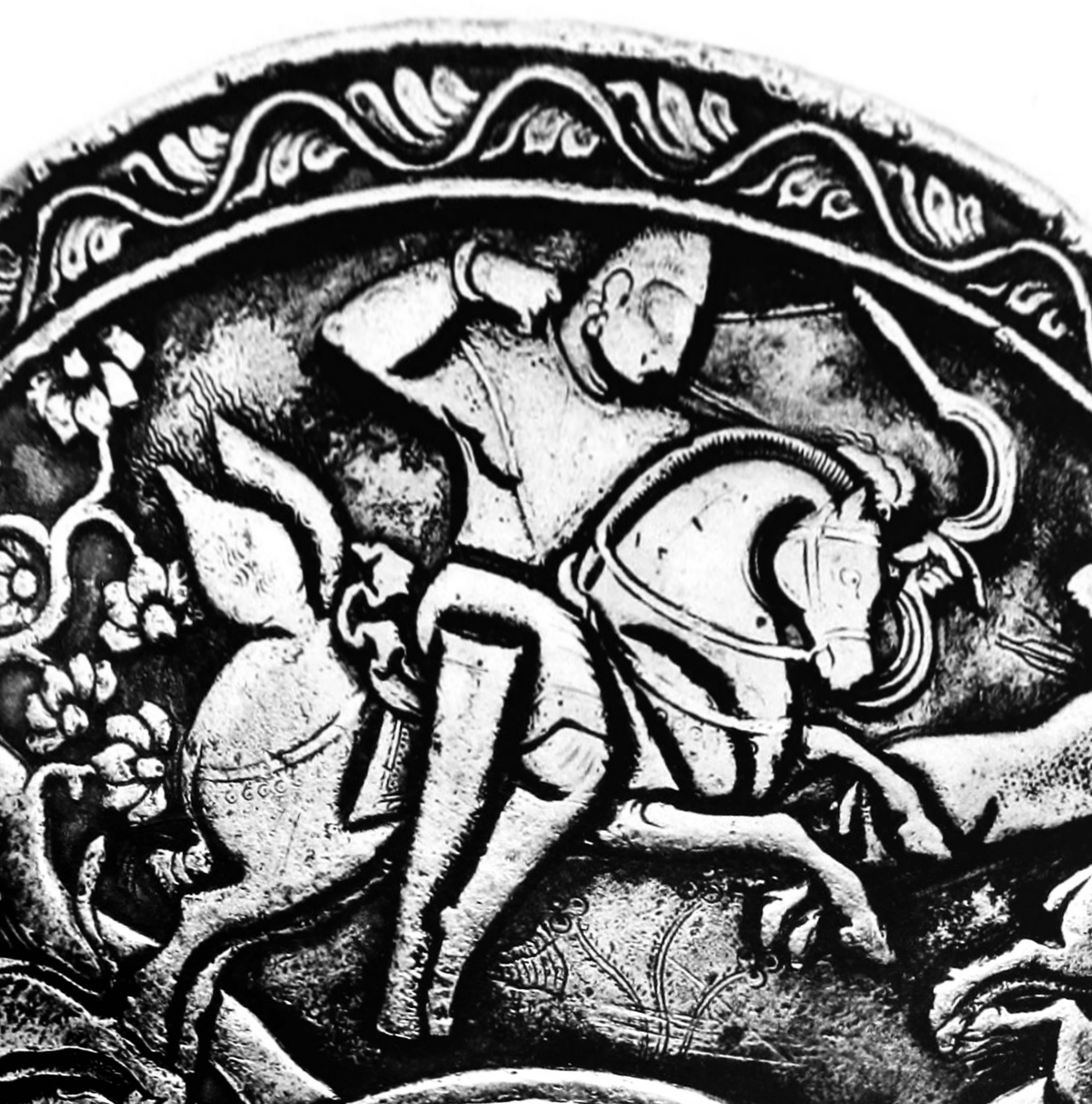
Alchon horseman.

The so-called "Hephthalite bowl" from Gandhara, features two Kidarite hunters wearing characteristic crowns, and as well as two Alchon hunters (one of them shown here, with skull deformation), suggesting a period of peaceful coexistence between the two entities. Swat District, Pakistan, 460–479 CE. British Museum.

The numismatic evidence as well as the so-called "Hephthalite bowl" from Gandhara, now in the British Museum, suggests a period of peaceful coexistence between the Kidarites and the Alchons, as it features two Kidarite noble hunters wearing their characteristic crowns, together with two Alchon hunters and one of the Alchons inside a medallion. At one point, the Kidarites withdrew from Gandhara, and the Alchons took over their mints from the time of Khingila.

The Alchons apparently undertook the mass destruction of Buddhist monasteries and stupas at Taxila, a high center of learning, which never recovered from the destruction. Virtually all of the Alchon coins found in the area of Taxila were found in the ruins of burned down monasteries, where apparently some of the invaders died alongside local defenders during the wave of destructions. It is thought that the Kanishka stupa, one of the most famous and tallest buildings in antiquity, was destroyed by them during their invasion of the area in the 460s CE. The Mankiala stupa was also vandalised during their invasions.

The rest of the 5th century marks a period of territorial expansion and eponymous kings, several of which appear to have overlapped and ruled jointly. (Note: "Here, for the first time, the names of Hepthalite (Alchon) kings are given, some of them otherwise known only from coins. Another important fact is that it dates all these kings in the same time." from Aydogdy Kurbanov (2010). The hephthalites: archaeological and historical analysis. Berlin: Free University of Berlin. p. 120. OCLC 863884689.) The Alchon Huns invaded parts of northwestern India from the second half of the 5th century. According to the Bhitari pillar inscription, the Gupta ruler Skandagupta already confronted and defeated an unnamed Huna ruler c. 456-457 CE.

=== Sindh ===
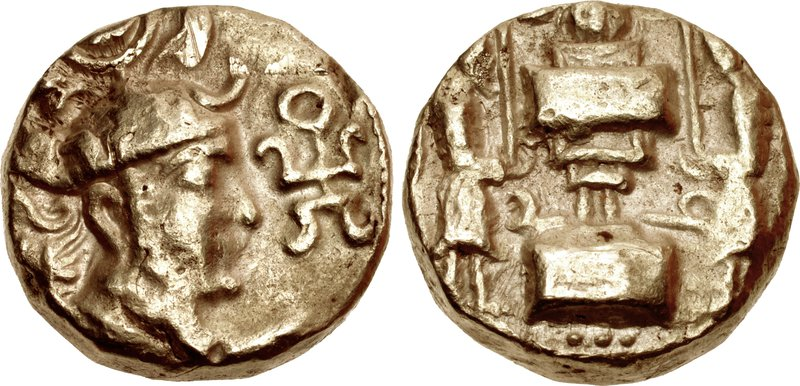
Uncertain Hunnic chieftain. Sindh. 5th century.

From circa 480 CE, there are also suggestion of Hunnic occupation of Sindh, between Multan and the mouth of the Indus River, as the local Sasanian coinage of Sindh starts to incorporate sun symbols or a Hunnic tamgha to the design. These little-known coins are usually described as the result of the invasions of the "Hephthalites". The quality of the coins also becomes very much degraded by that time, and the actual gold content becomes quite low compared to the previous Sasanian-style coinage.

==== Contributions ====
The Hūṇas were precisely ruling the area of Malwa, at the doorstep of the Western Deccan, at the time the famous Ajanta Caves were made by ruler Harisena of the Vakataka Empire. Through their control of vast areas of northwestern India, the Huns may actually have acted as a cultural bridge between the area of Gandhara and the Western Deccan, at the time when the Ajanta or Pitalkhora caves were being decorated with designs of Gandharan inspiration, such as Buddhas dressed in robes with abundant folds.

=== First Hunnic War: Central India ===
Kausambi

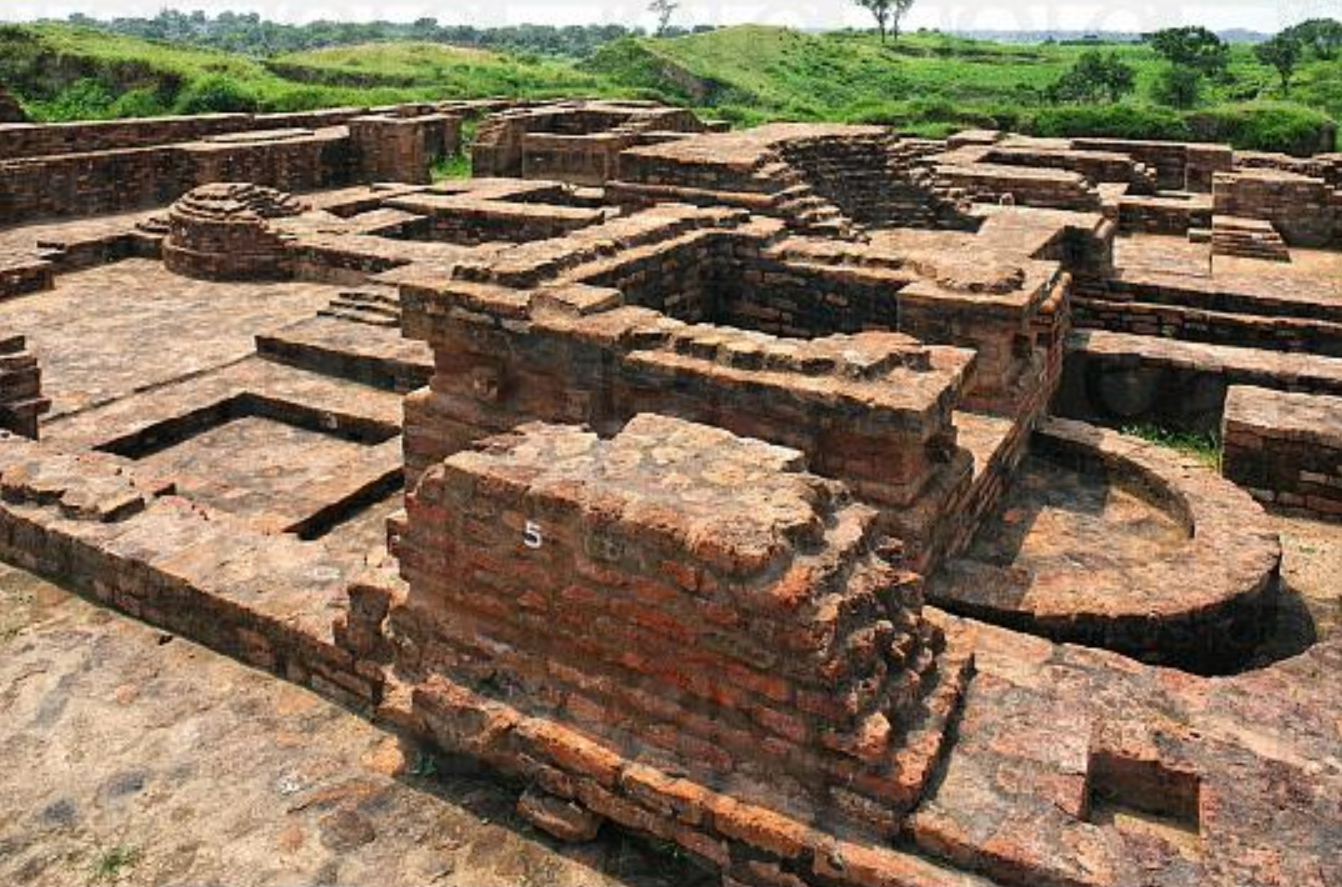
The monastery of Ghoshitarama in Kausambi was probably destroyed by the Alchon Huns under Toramana.

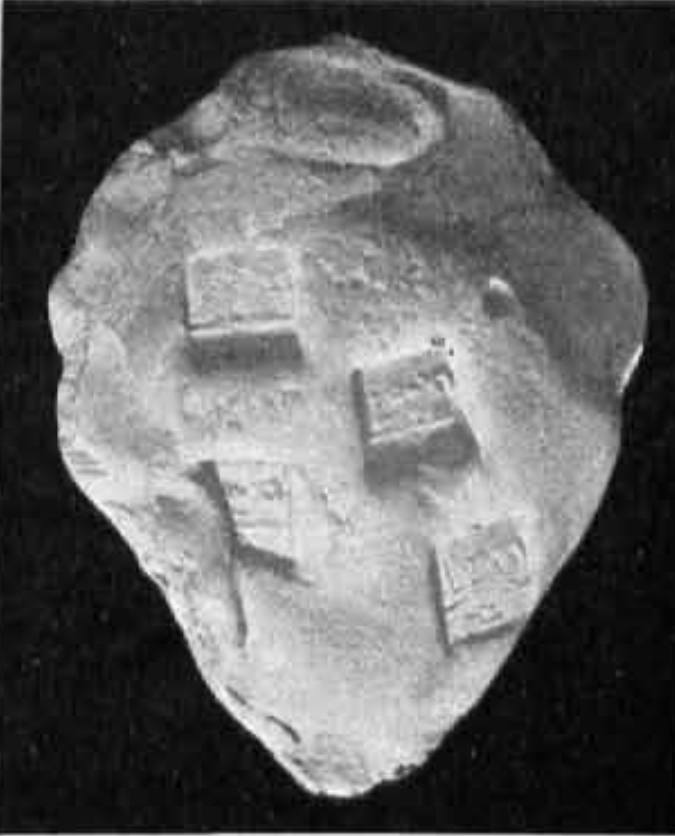
"Hūna Rāja" Toramana seal impression, Kausambi

In the First Hunnic War (496–515), the Alchon reached their maximum territorial extent, with King Toramana pushing deep into Indian territory, reaching Gujarat and Madhya Pradesh in Central India, and ultimately contributing to the downfall of the Gupta Empire. To the south, the Sanjeli inscriptions indicate that Toramana penetrated at least as far as northern Gujarat, and possibly to the port of Bharukaccha. To the east, far into Central India, the city of Kausambi, where seals with Toramana's name were found, was probably sacked by the Alkhons in 497–500, before they moved to occupy Malwa. In particular, it is thought that the monastery of Ghoshitarama in Kausambi was destroyed by Toramana, as several of his seals were found there, one of them bearing the name Toramana impressed over the official seal of the monastery, and the other bearing the title Hūnarāja ("King of the Huns"), together with debris and arrowheads. Another seal, this time by Mihirakula, is reported from Kausambi. These territories may have been taken from Gupta Emperor Budhagupta. Alternatively, they may have been captured during the rule of his successor Narasimhagupta.

==== First Battle of Eran (510 CE) ====
A decisive battle occurred in Malwa, where a local Gupta ruler, probably a governor, named Bhanugupta was in charge. In the Bhanugupta Eran inscription, this local ruler reports that his army participated in a great battle in 510 CE at Eran, where it suffered severe casualties. Bhanugupta was probably vanquished by Toramana at this battle, so that the western Gupta province of Malwa fell into the hands of the Hunas.

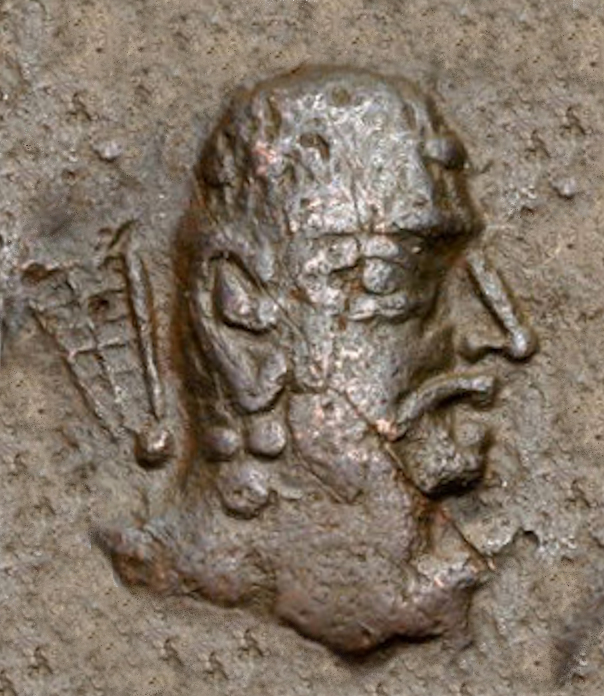
Portrait of Toramana. He sacked Kausambi and occupied Malwa.

According to a 6th-century CE Buddhist work, the Manjusri-mula-kalpa, Bhanugupta lost Malwa to the "Shudra" Toramana, who continued his conquest to Magadha, forcing Narasimhagupta Baladitya to make a retreat to Bengal. Toramana "possessed of great prowess and armies" then conquered the city of Tirtha in the Gauda country (modern Bengal). (Note: "After the successful conclusion of the Eran episode, the conquering Hunas ultimately burst out of Eastern Malwa and swooped down upon the very heart of the Gupta empire. The eastern countries were overrun and the city of the Gaudas was occupied. The Manjusrimulakalpa gives a scintillating account of this phase of Toramana's conquest. It says that after Bhanugupta's defeat and discomfiture, Toramana led the Hunas against Magadha and obliged Baladitya (Narasimha-gupta Baladitya, the reigning Gupta monarch) to retire to Bengal. This great monarch (Toramana), Sudra by caste and possessed of great prowess and armies took hold of that position (bank of the Ganges) and commanded the country round about. That powerful king then invested the town called Tirtha in the Gauda country." in Upendra Thakur (1967). The Hūṇas in India. Vol. 58. Varanasi: Chowkhamba Sanskrit Series Office. p. 122. OCLC 551489665.) Toramana is said to have crowned a new king in Benares, named Prakataditya, who is also presented as a son of Narasimha Gupta.

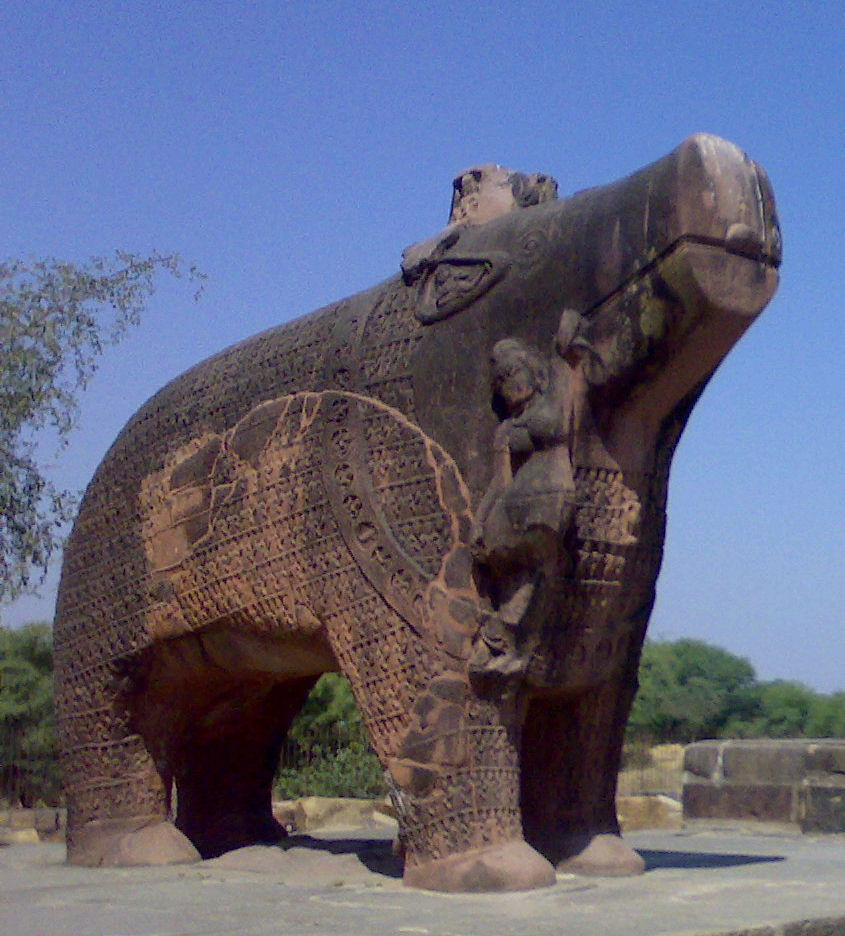
The Eran "Varaha" boar, under the neck of which can be found the Eran boar inscription mentioning the rule of Toramana.

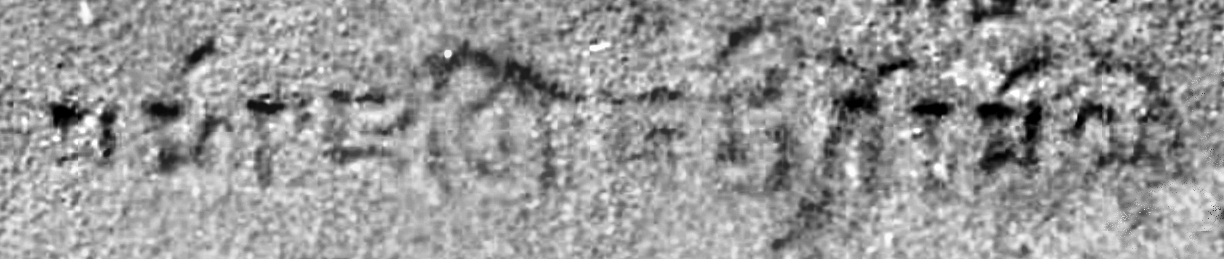
Mahārājadhirāja Shrī Toramāṇa
"Great King of Kings, Lord Toramana"
in the Eran boar inscription of Toramana in the Gupta script.

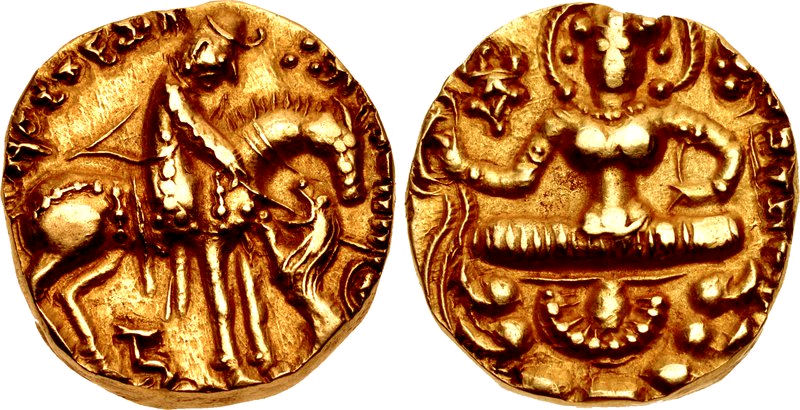
A rare gold coin of Toramana in the style of the Guptas. The obverse legend reads: "The lord of the Earth, Toramana, having conquered the Earth, wins Heaven".

Having conquered the territory of Malwa from the Guptas, Toramana was mentioned in a famous inscription in Eran, confirming his rule on the region. The Eran boar inscription of Toramana (in Eran, Malwa, 540 km south of New Delhi, state of Madhya Pradesh) of his first regnal year indicates that eastern Malwa was included in his dominion. The inscription is written under the neck of the boar, in 8 lines of Sanskrit in the Brahmi script. The first line of the inscription, in which Toramana is introduced as Mahararajadhidaja (The Great King of Kings), reads:

In year one of the reign of the King of Kings Sri-Toramana, who rules the world with splendor and radiance...

— Eran boar inscription of Toramana

On his gold coins minted in India in the style of the Gupta Emperors, Toramana presented himself confidently as:

Avanipati Torama(no) vijitya vasudham divam jayati

The lord of the Earth, Toramana, having conquered the Earth, wins Heaven

— Toramana gold coin legend.

The fact that the Alchon Huns issued gold coins, such as the Toramana issue, in addition to their silver and copper coins, suggest that their empire in India was quite rich and powerful.

==== Defeat (515 CE) ====
Toramana was finally defeated by local Indian rulers. The local ruler Bhanugupta is sometimes credited with vanquishing Toramana, as his 510 CE inscription in Eran, recording his participation in "a great battle", is vague enough to allow for such an interpretation. The "great battle" in which Bhanagupta participated is not detailed, and it is impossible to know what it was, or which way it ended, and interpretations vary. Mookerji and others consider, in view of the inscription as well as the Manjusri-mula-kalpa, that Bhanugupta was, on the contrary, vanquished by Toramana at the 510 CE Eran battle, so that the western Gupta province of Malwa fell into the hands of the Hunas at that point, so that Toramana could be mentioned in the Eran boar inscription, as the ruler of the region.

Toramana was finally vanquished with certainty by an Indian ruler of the Aulikara dynasty of Malwa, after nearly 20 years in India. According to the Rīsthal stone-slab inscription, discovered in 1983, King Prakashadharma defeated Toramana in 515 CE. The First Hunnic War thus ended with a Hunnic defeat, and Hunnic troops apparently retreated to the area of Punjab. The Manjusri-mula-kalpa simply states that Toramana died in Benares as he was returning westward from his battles with Narasimhagupta.

=== Second Hunnic War: to Malwa and retreat ===
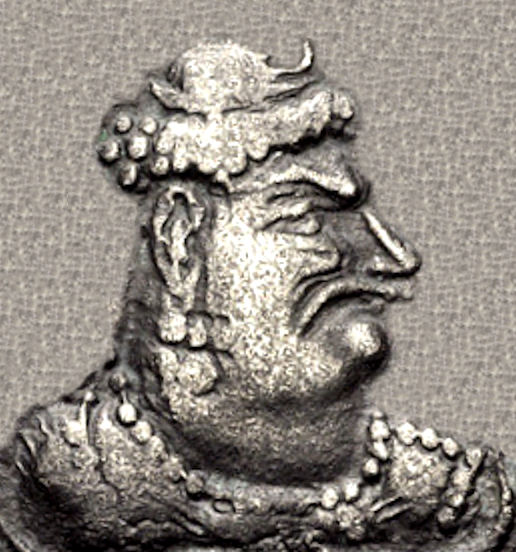
Mihirakula on one of his coins. He was finally defeated in 528 by King Yasodharman.

The Second Hunnic War started in 520, when the Alchon king Mihirakula, son of Toramana, is recorded in his military encampment on the borders of the Jhelum by Chinese monk Song Yun. At the head of the Alchon, Mihirakula is then recorded in Gwalior, Central India as "Lord of the Earth" in the Gwalior inscription of Mihirakula. According to some accounts, Mihirakula invaded India as far as the Gupta capital Pataliputra, which was sacked and left in ruins.

There was a king called Mo-hi-lo-kiu-lo (Mihirakula), who established his authority in this town (Sagala) and ruled over India. He was of quick talent, and naturally brave. He subdued all the neighbouring provinces without exception.

— Xuanzang "The Record of the Western Regions", 7th century CE

The destructions of Mihirakula are also recorded in the Rajatarangini:

Mihirakula, a man of violent acts and resembling Kāla (Death) ruled in the land which was overrun by hordes of Mlecchas... the people knew his approach by noticing the vultures, crows, and other [birds], which were flying ahead to feed on those who were being slain within his army's [reach]

— The Rajatarangini

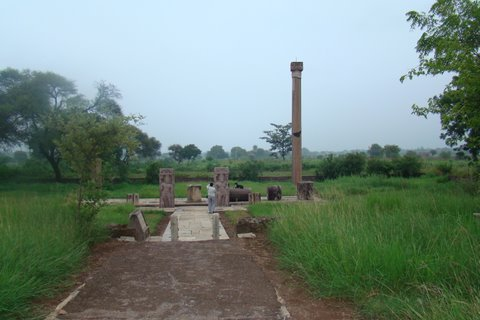
Pillar of Yashodharman at Sondani near Mandsaur, with the Sondani inscription claiming victory over Mihirakula of the Alchons in 528 CE.

Finally however, Mihirakula was defeated in 528 by an alliance of Indian principalities led by Yasodharman, the Aulikara king of Malwa, in the Battle of Sondani in Central India, which resulted in the loss of Alchon possessions in the Punjab and north India by 542. The Sondani inscription in Sondani, near Mandsaur, records the submission by force of the Hunas, and claims that Yasodharman had rescued the earth from rude and cruel kings, (Note: "The earth betook itself (for succour), when it was afflicted by kings of the present age, who manifested pride; who were cruel through want of proper training; who, from delusion, transgressed the path of good conduct; (and) who were destitute of virtuous delights " from "Sondhni pillars: where Punjabis met with their Waterloo 1500 years ago". Punjab Monitor. Amritsar: Bhai Nand Lal Foundation. 27 April 2013.) and that he "had bent the head of Mihirakula". In a part of the Sondani inscription Yasodharman thus praises himself for having defeated king Mihirakula:

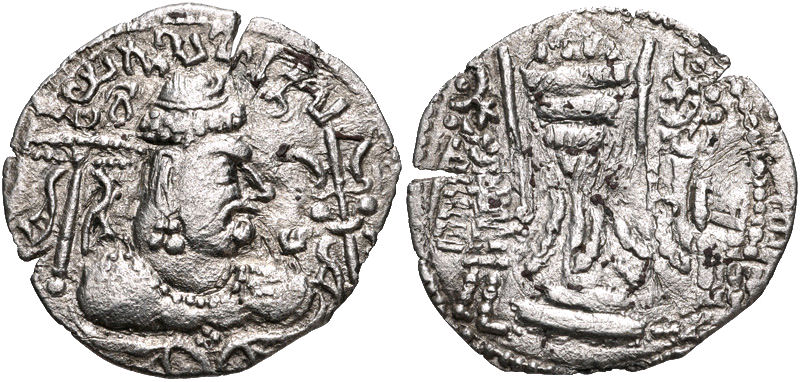
Mihirakula used the Indian Gupta script on his coinage. Obv: Bust of king, with legend in Gupta script, (Ja)yatu Mihirakula ("Let there be victory to Mihirakula").

He (Yasodharman) to whose two feet respect was paid, with complimentary presents of the flowers from the lock of hair on the top of (his) head, by even that (famous) king Mihirakula, whose forehead was pained through being bent low down by the strength of (his) arm in (the act of compelling) obeisance

— Sondani pillar inscription

The Gupta Empire emperor Narasimhagupta is also credited in helping repulse Mihirakula, after the latter had conquered most of India, according to the reports of Chinese monk Xuanzang. In a fanciful account, Xuanzang, who wrote a century later in 630 CE, reported that Mihirakula had conquered all India except for an island where the king of Magadha named Baladitya (who could be Gupta ruler Narasimhagupta Baladitya) took refuge, but that was finally captured by the Indian king. He later spared Mihirakula's life on the intercession of his mother, as she perceived the Hun ruler "as a man of remarkable beauty and vast wisdom". Mihirakula is then said to have returned to Kashmir to retake the throne. This ended the Second Hunnic War in c. 534, after an occupation which lasted nearly 15 years.

==== Victories of the Maukharis ====
According to the Aphsad inscription of Ādityasena, the Maukharis also fought against the Hunas in the areas of the Gangetic Doab and Magadha. The Aphsad inscription of Ādityasena mentions the military successes of kings of the Later Gupta dynasty against the Maukharis, and explains that the Maukharis were past victors of the Hunas:

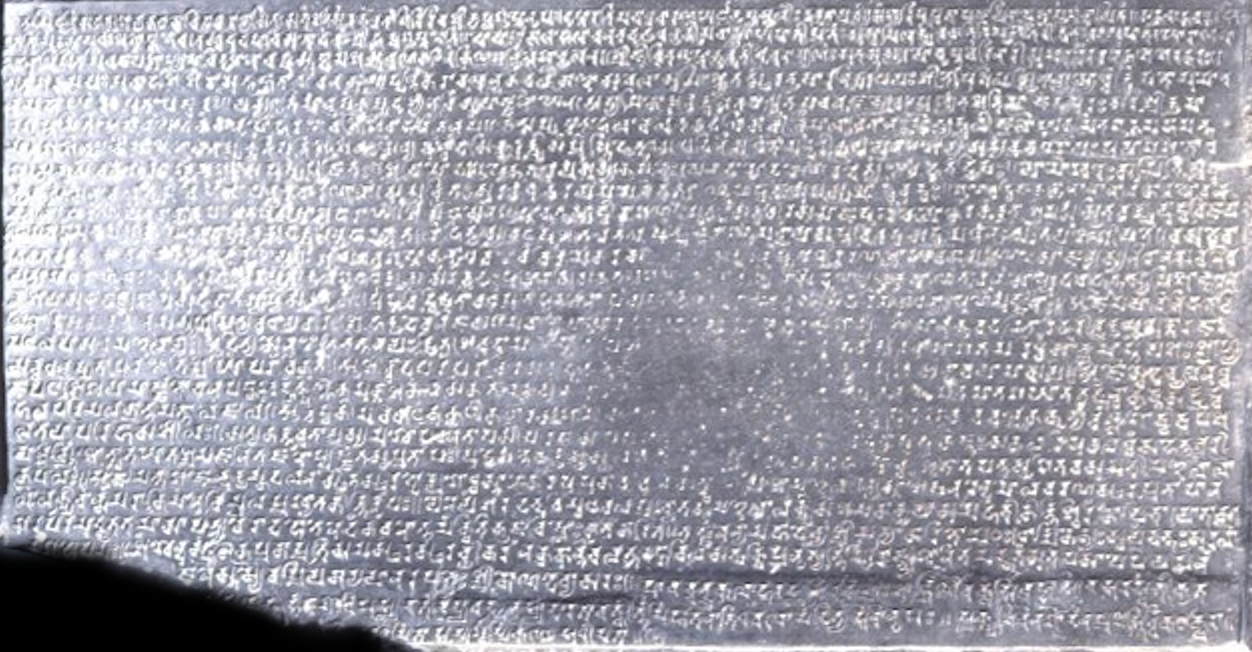
The Aphsad inscription of Ādityasena

The son of that king (Kumaragupta) was the illustrious Dâmôdaragupta, by whom (his) enemies were slain, just like the demons by (the god) Dâmôdara. Breaking up the proudly stepping array of mighty elephants, belonging to the Maukhari, which had thrown aloft in battle the troops of the Hûnas (in order to trample them to death), he became unconscious (and expired in the fight).

— Line 8 of the Aphsad inscription of Ādityasena.

The Maukharis led by their king Ishanavarman, rather than any of the Guptas, were therefore pivotal in repelling the Hunas.

=== Retreat to Gandhara and Kashmir (530 CE) ===
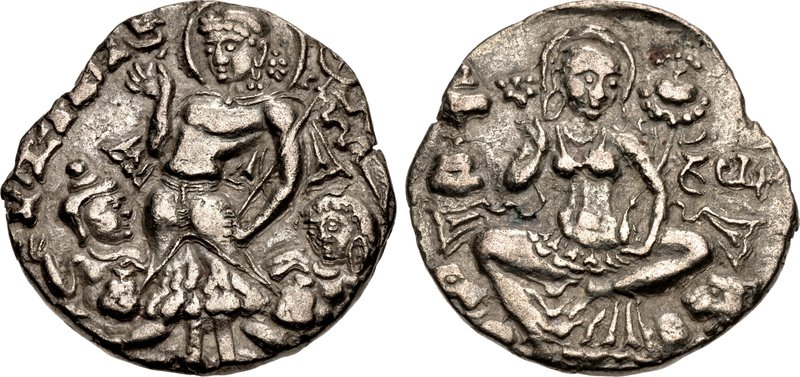
Coinage of Sri Pravarasena, successor of Mihirakula, and supposed founder of Srinagar. Obverse: Standing king with two figured seated below. Name "Pravarasena". Reverse: goddess seated on a lion. Legend "Kidāra". Circa 6th-early 7th century CE

The Alchon Huns resettled in the area of Gandhara and Kashmir in northwestern India under the rule of Sri Pravarasena (c.530-590 CE), thought to be the son of Toramana. His reign probably lasted about 60 years from circa 530 CE. According to Kalhana's 12th century text Rajatarangini, Pravarasena established a new capital named Pravarapura (also known as Pravarasena-pura). Based on topographical details, Pravarapura appears to be same as the modern city of Srinagar. He also built a temple named "Pravaresha".

Pravarasena was probably succeeded by a king named Gokarna, a follower of Shiva, and then by his son king Narendraditya Khinkhila. The son of Narendraditya was Yudhishthira, who succeeded him as king, and was the last known king of the Alchon Huns. According to the Rajatarangini Yudhishthira ruled 40 years, probably until circa 625 CE, but he was dethroned by Pratapaditya, son of the founder of the Karkoṭa Empire, Durlabhavardhana.

==== Kashmir descendants of the Alchon Huns ====
Several rulers with Alchon names appear in Kalhana's Rajatarangini. Although the chronology of the Rajatarangini is largely deficient, several of the names of these rulers, especially those belonging to the so-called Gonanda dynasty (II), have been confirmed by coin finds in Kashmir and dated to the 7th century CE. They were "very likely" descendants of the Alchon Huns in the Kashmir area.

=== Retreat to Kabulistan and displacement of the Nezak Huns ===
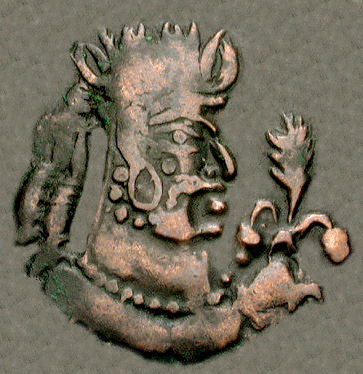
Portrait of Toramana II, from his coinage.

Around the end of the 6th century CE, the Alchons withdrew to Kashmir and, pulling back from Punjab and Gandhara, moved west across the Khyber Pass where they resettled in Kabulistan under the leadership of Toramana II. There, their coinage suggests that they merged with the Nezak – as coins in Nezak style now bear the Alchon tamga mark.

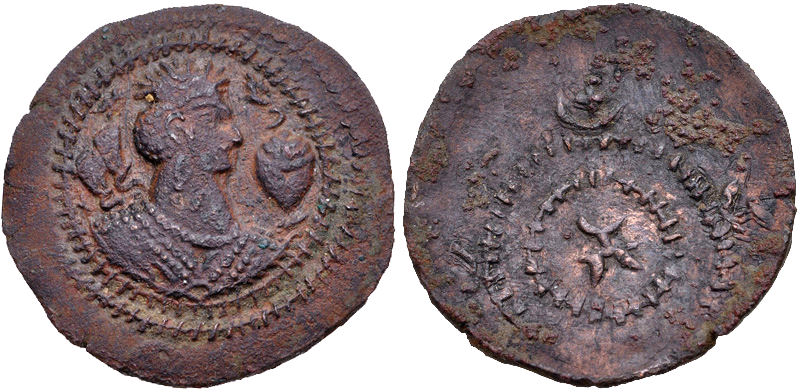
Alchon-Nezak "crossover coinage", 580–680. Nezak-style bust on the obverse, and Alchon tamga within double border on the reverse.

During the 7th century, continued military encounters are reported between the Hunas and the northern Indian states which followed the disappearance of the Gupta Empire. For example, Prabhakaravardhana, the Vardhana dynasty king of Thanesar in northern India and father of Harsha, is reported to have been "A lion to the Huna deer, a burning fever to the king of the Indus land".

The Alchons in India declined rapidly around the same time that the Hephthalites, a related group to the north, were defeated by an alliance between the Sassanians and the Western Turkic Kaghanate in 557–565 CE. The areas of Khuttal and Kapisa-Gandhara had remained independent kingdoms under the Alchon Huns, under kings such as Narendra, but in 625 CE they were taken over by the expanding Western Turks when they established the Yabghus of Tokharistan. Eventually, the Nezak-Alchons were replaced by the Turk Shahi dynasty around 665 CE.

== Religion and ethics ==
=== Buddhism ===
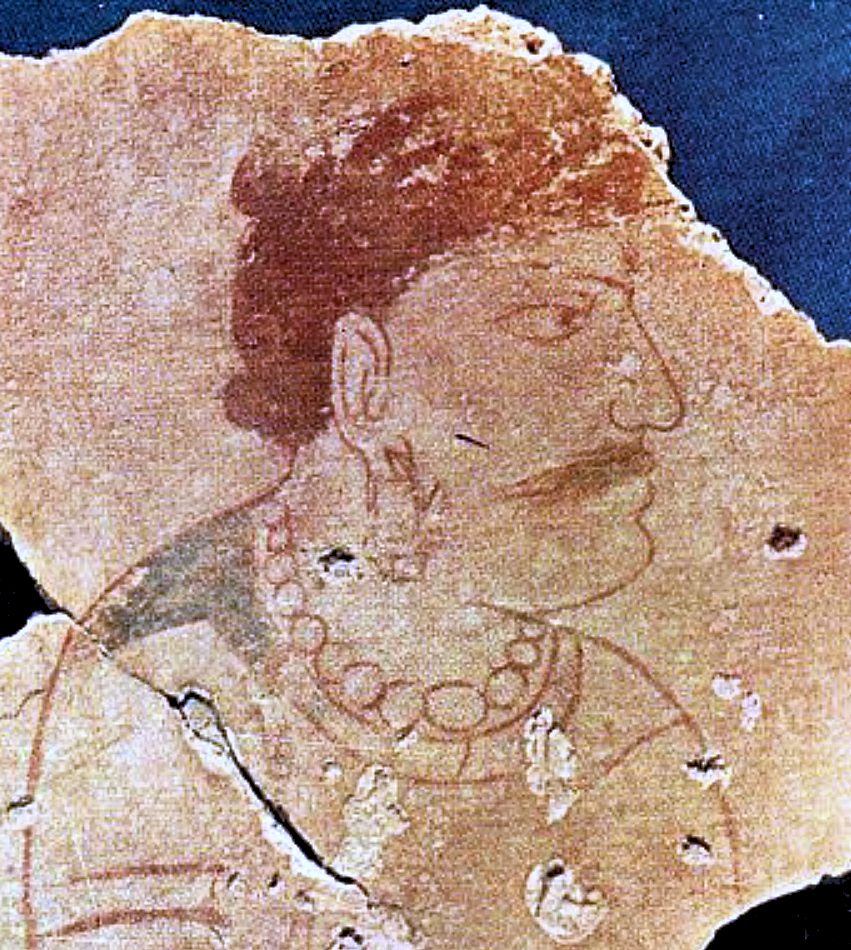
Alchon devotee, Butkara I (construction phase 4), 5th century CE.

The four Alchon kings Khingila, Toramana, Javukha, and Mehama are mentioned as donors to a Buddhist stupa in the Talagan copper scroll inscription dated to 492 or 493 CE, that is, at a time before the Hunnic wars in India started. This corresponds to a time when the Alchons had recently taken control of Taxila (around 460 CE), at the center of the Buddhist regions of northwestern India. Numerous Alchon coins were found in the dedication compartment of the "Tope Kalān" stupa in Hadda.

Mural with paintings of probable Alchon devotees can be seen in the Buddhist complex of the Butkara Stupa (Butkara I, construction phase 4). Dated to the 5th century CE, they suggest that the Alchon Huns may have been participants to the local Buddhist culture.

=== Persecution of Buddhism ===
Later, however, the attitude of the Alchons towards Buddhism is reported to have been negative. Mihirakula in particular is remembered by Buddhist sources to have been a "terrible persecutor of their religion" in Gandhara in northern (modern day) Pakistan. During his reign, over one thousand Buddhist monasteries throughout Gandhara are said to have been destroyed. In particular, the writings of Chinese monk Xuanzang from 630 CE explained that Mihirakula ordered the destruction of Buddhism and the expulsion of monks. Indeed, the Buddhist art of Gandhara, in particular Greco-Buddhist art, becomes essentially extinct around that period. When Xuanzang visited northwestern India in c. 630 CE, he reported that Buddhism had drastically declined, and that most of the monasteries were deserted and left in ruins.

Although the Guptas were traditionally a Hindu dynasty, around the period of the invasions of the Alchon the Gupta rulers had apparently been favouring Buddhism. According to contemporary writer Paramartha, Mihirakula's supposed nemesis Narasimhagupta Baladitya was brought up under the influence of the Mahayanist philosopher Vasubandhu. He built a sangharama at Nalanda and a 300 ft (91 m) high vihara with a Buddha statue within which, according to Xuanzang, resembled the "great Vihara built under the Bodhi tree". According to the Manjushrimulakalpa (c. 800 CE), king Narasimhsagupta became a Buddhist monk, and left the world through meditation (Dhyana). Xuanzang also noted that Narasimhagupta Baladitya's son Vajra, who also commissioned a sangharama, "possessed a heart firm in faith".

The 12th century Kashmiri historian Kalhana also painted a dreary picture of Mihirakula's cruelty, as well as his persecution of the Buddhist faith:

Solar symbolism

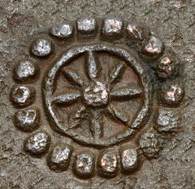
Solar symbol on the coinage of Toramana.

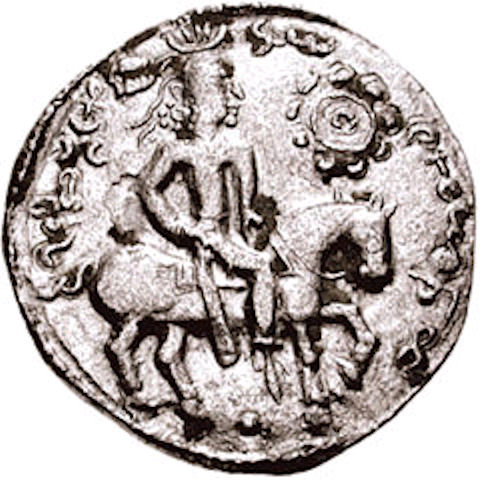
Khingila with solar symbol.

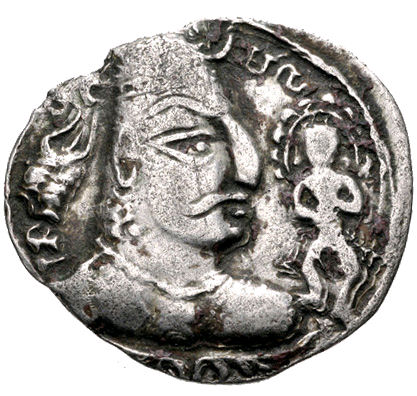
Alchon king with small male figure wearing solar nimbus.

In him, the northern region brought forth, as it were, another god of death, bent in rivalry to surpass... Yama (the god of death residing in the southern regions). People knew of his approach by noticing the vultures, crows and other birds flying ahead eager to feed on those who were being slain within his army's reach. The royal Vetala (demon) was day and night surrounded by thousands of murdered human beings, even in his pleasure houses. This terrible enemy of mankind had no pity for children, no compassion for women, no respect for the aged

— 12th century Kashmiri historian Kalhana

=== Hinduism (Sun cult, Vaishnavism and Shaivism) ===
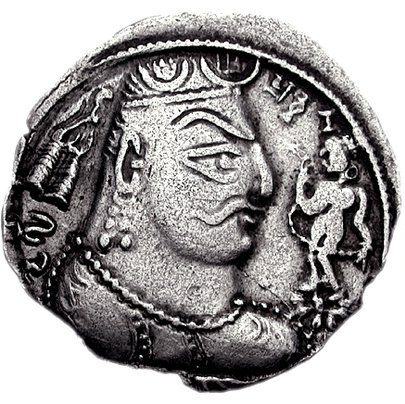
Coinage of Khingila with Hindu goddess Lakshmi.

The Alchons are generally described as sun worshipers, a traditional cult of steppe nomads. This stems from the appearance of sun symbols on some of their coins, combined with the probable influence they received from the worship of Surya in India.

The Hindu Vaishnavite goddess Lakshmi, goddess of wealth, fortune, power, beauty, fertility and prosperity and also an ancient goddess of Buddhism, also appears on the coinage of some rulers, especially Khingila, and Toramana.

Mihirakula is also said to have been an ardent worshiper of Shiva, although he may have been selectively attracted to the destructive powers of the Indian deity.

Mihirakula is said to have been the founder of the Shankaracharya Temple, a shrine dedicated to Shiva in Srinagar,

== Consequences for India ==
The Alchon invasions, although only spanning a few decades, had long term effects on India, and in a sense brought an end to the middle kingdoms of India.

=== Destructions ===
Political fragmentation of South Asia after the fall of the Gupta Empire and the retreat of the Alchon Huns to the northwest, circa 600 CE.

Indian urban culture was left in decline. Major traditional cities, such as Kausambi and probably Ujjain were in ruins, Vidisha and Mathura fell into decline. Buddhism, gravely weakened by the destruction of monasteries and the killing of monks, started to collapse. Great centers of learning were destroyed, such as the city of Taxila, bringing cultural regression. The art of Mathura suffered greatly from the destructions brought by the Hunas, as did the art of Gandhara in the northwest, and both schools of art were nearly wiped out under the rule of the Huna Mihirakula. New cities arose from these destructions, such as Dashapura, Kanyakubja, Sthaneshvara, Valabhi and Shripura.

=== Political fragmentation ===
Soon after the invasions, the Gupta Empire, already weakened by these invasions and the rise of local rulers, ended as well. Following the invasions, northern India was left in disarray, with numerous smaller Indian powers emerging after the crumbling of the Guptas. Many autonomous regional states rose to prominence following the dislocation of Gupta power: the Aulikaras, the Maukharis, the Maitrakas, the Kalacuris or the Vardhanas, all in a constant flux of rivalry. With the end of Hunnic power, some India polities, such as the Maukhari dynasty were able to establish direct contacts with Central Asia and the Sasanian Empire: the Maukhari King Śarvavarman of Kannauj is said to have introduced the game of chess to the Sasanian court of Khosrow I, between the beginning of Śarvavarman's reign in 560/565 and the end of Khosrow's reign in 579.

=== Rise of Saivism ===
Vaisnavism, which had been strongly supported by the Gupta Empire, was discredited by the decline and the ultimate failure of the Empire. All the newly arising regional powers preferred adopting Saivism instead, as did the Alchon Huns under Mihirakula, giving a strong impetus to the development of the worship of Shiva, and its ideology of power. Vaisnavism only remained strong in the territories which had not been affected by these events: South India and Kashmir.

=== Artistic syncretism: "A Nomadic Interlude in Indian Art" ===
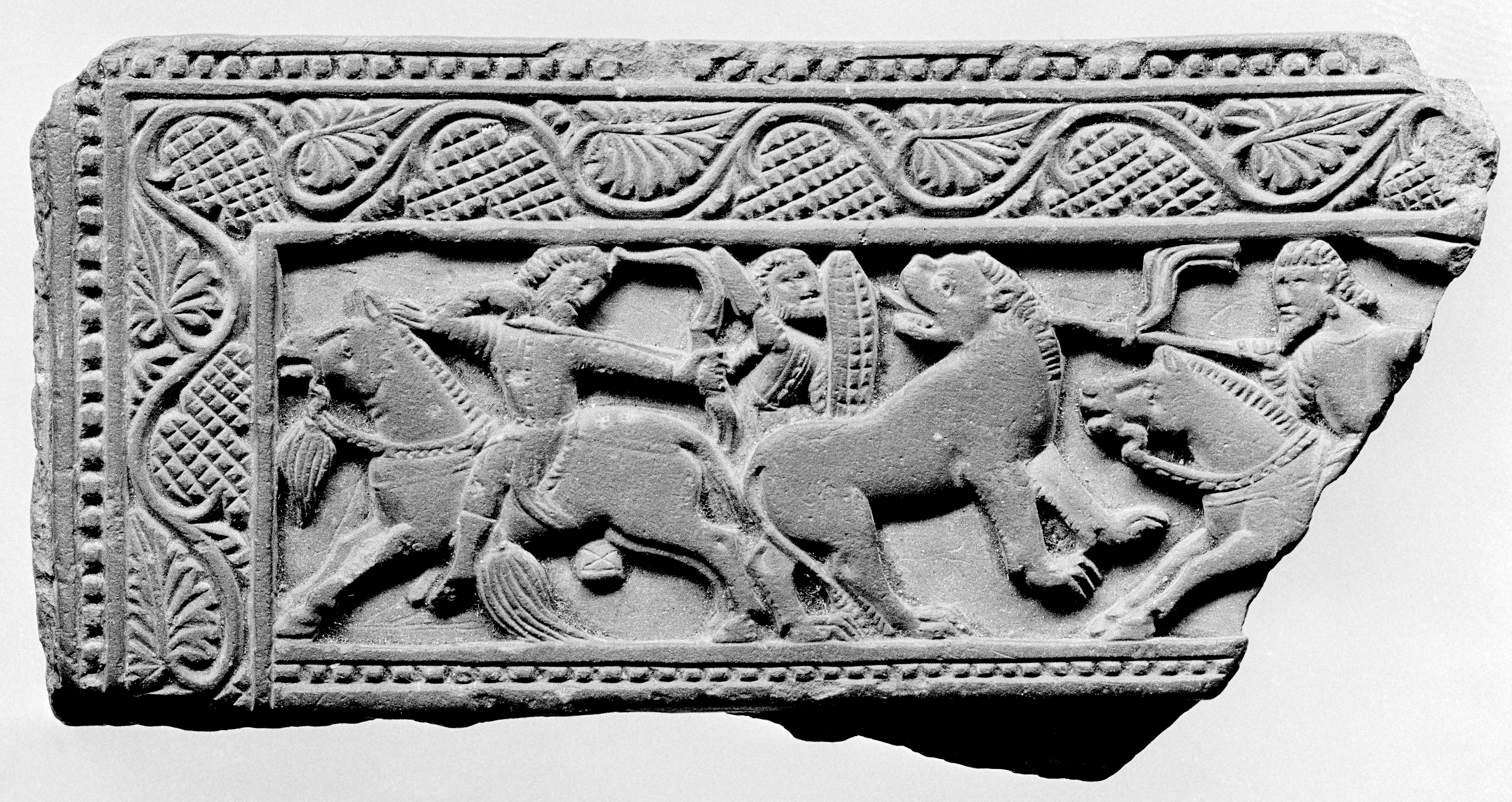
Fragment of a lid with a hunting scene, Gandhara, 5-6th century CE.

The advances of the Alchon Huns in India seems to have fostered a type of syncretic art in Gandhara during the 5th-6th century, mixing Gupta art with Sasanian and Hunish inspiration and themes. Particularly significant are a type of decorated lids from Gandhara which display courtly or hunting scenes, mixing them with Gupta decorative designs.

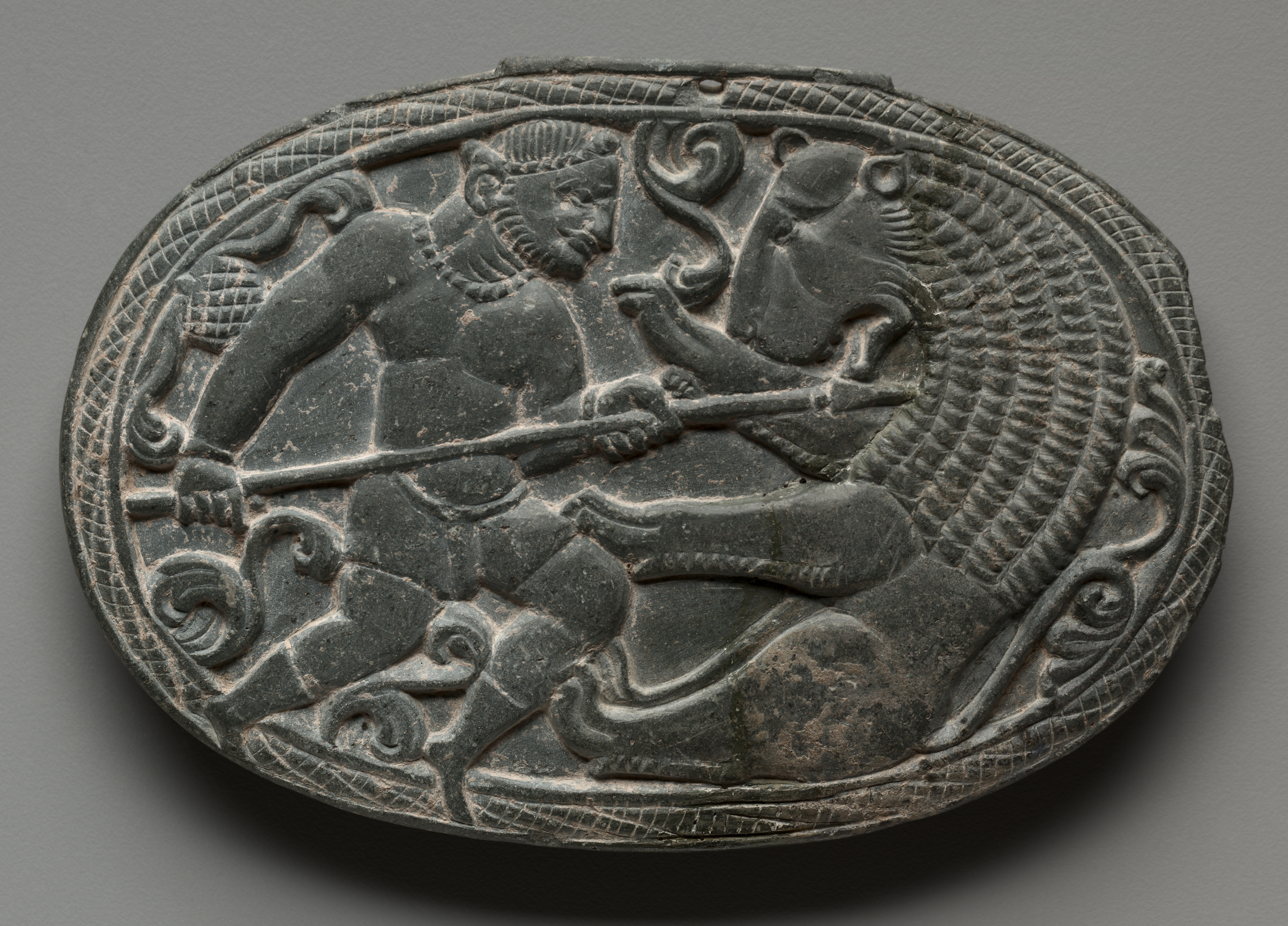
Lid with Combat between a Man and a Lion. Cleveland Museum of Art.

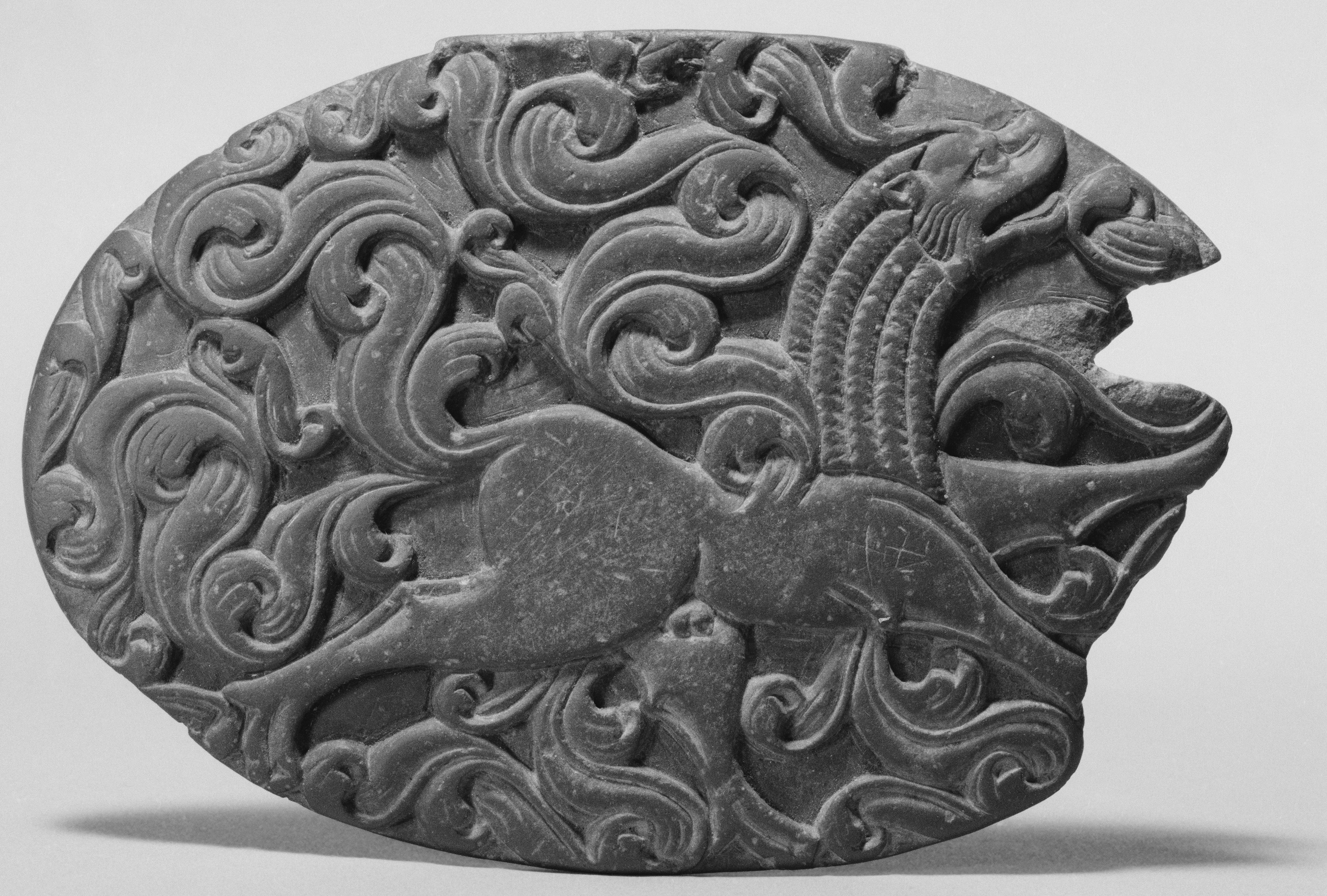
Box Lid with a Winged Lion, Gandhara, 5th century CE

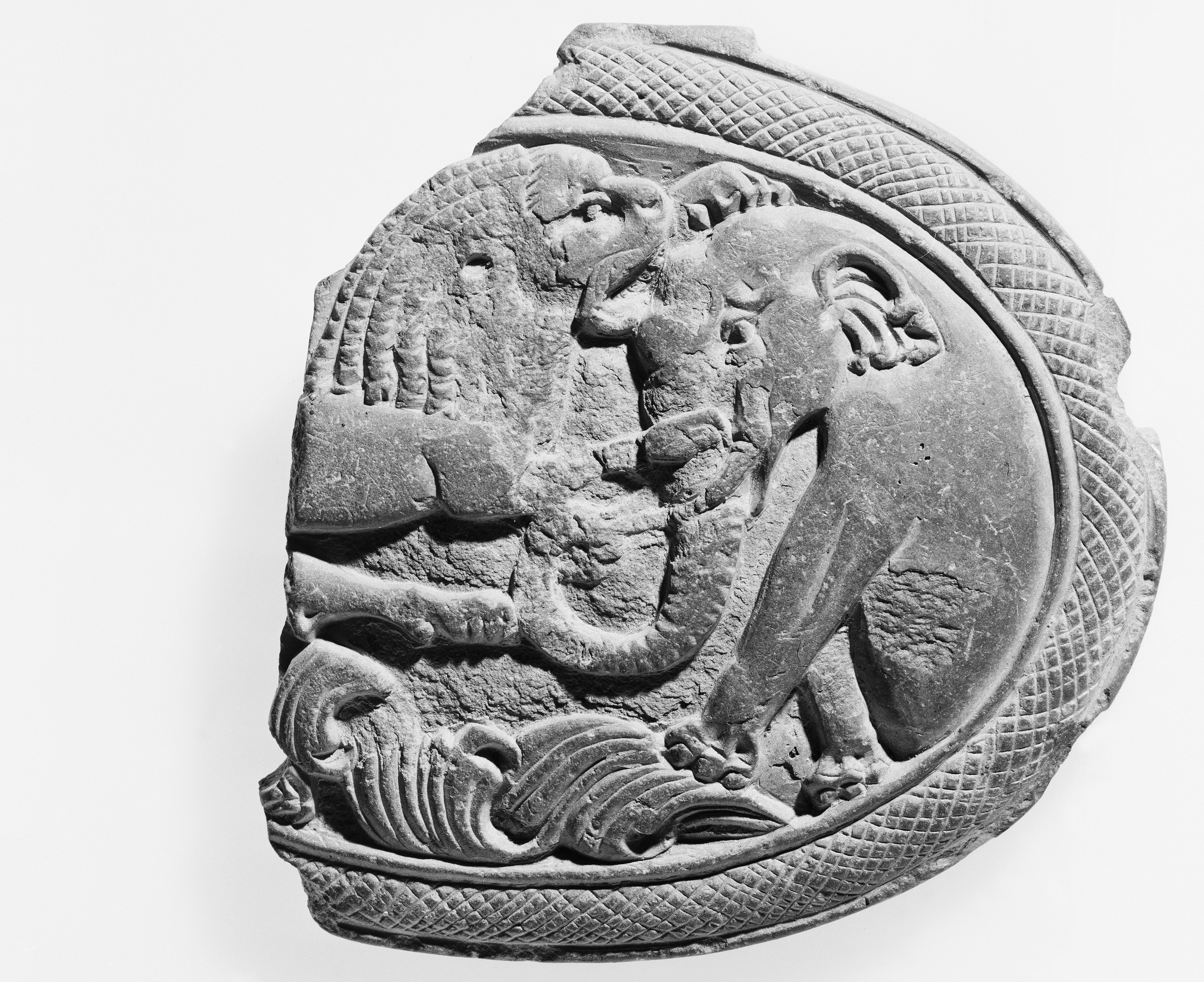
Box Lid with a Lion Attacking an Elephant, Gandhara, 5th century CE.

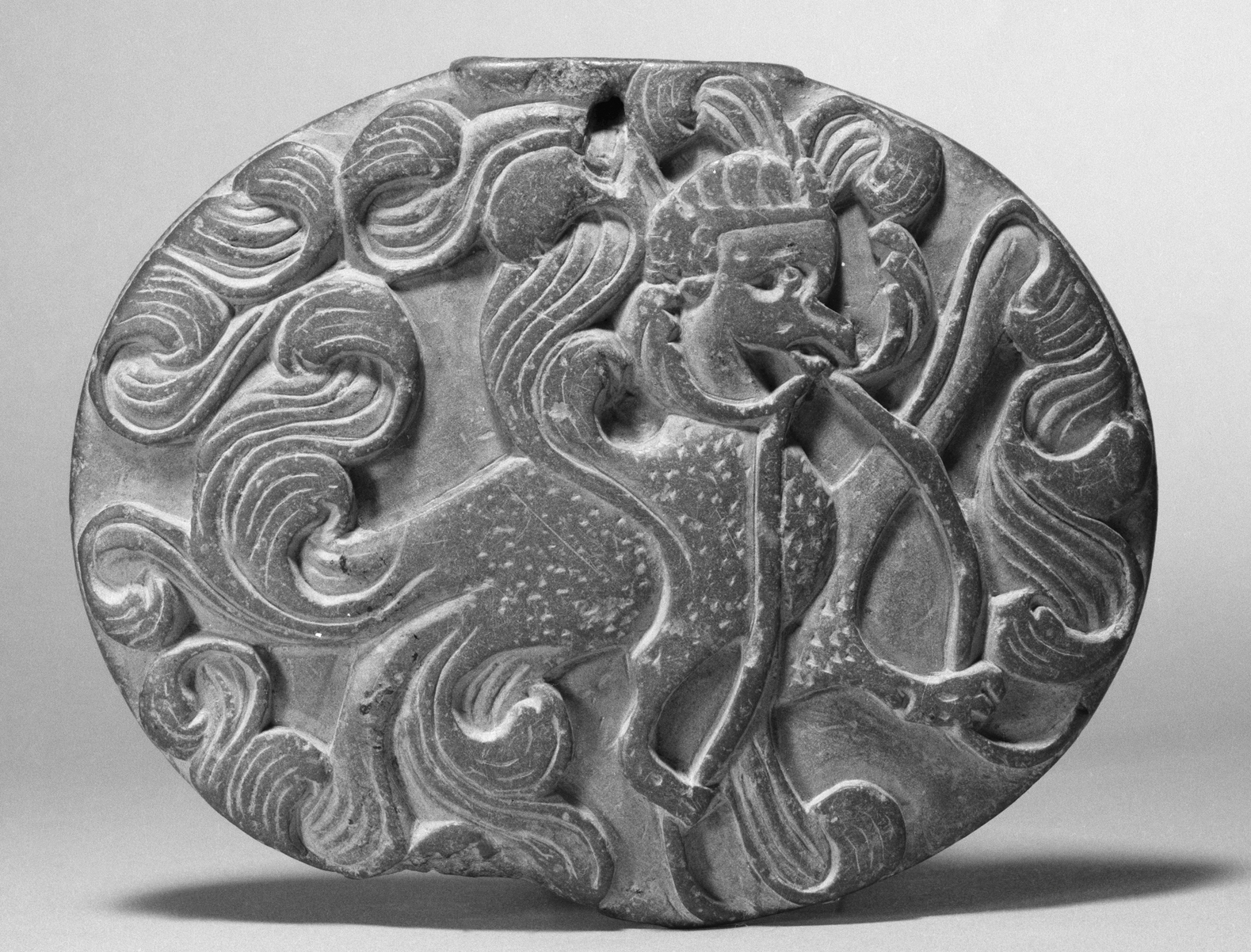
Box Lid with a Phoenix, Gandhara, 5th century CE.

==== The Chilek silver bowl ====
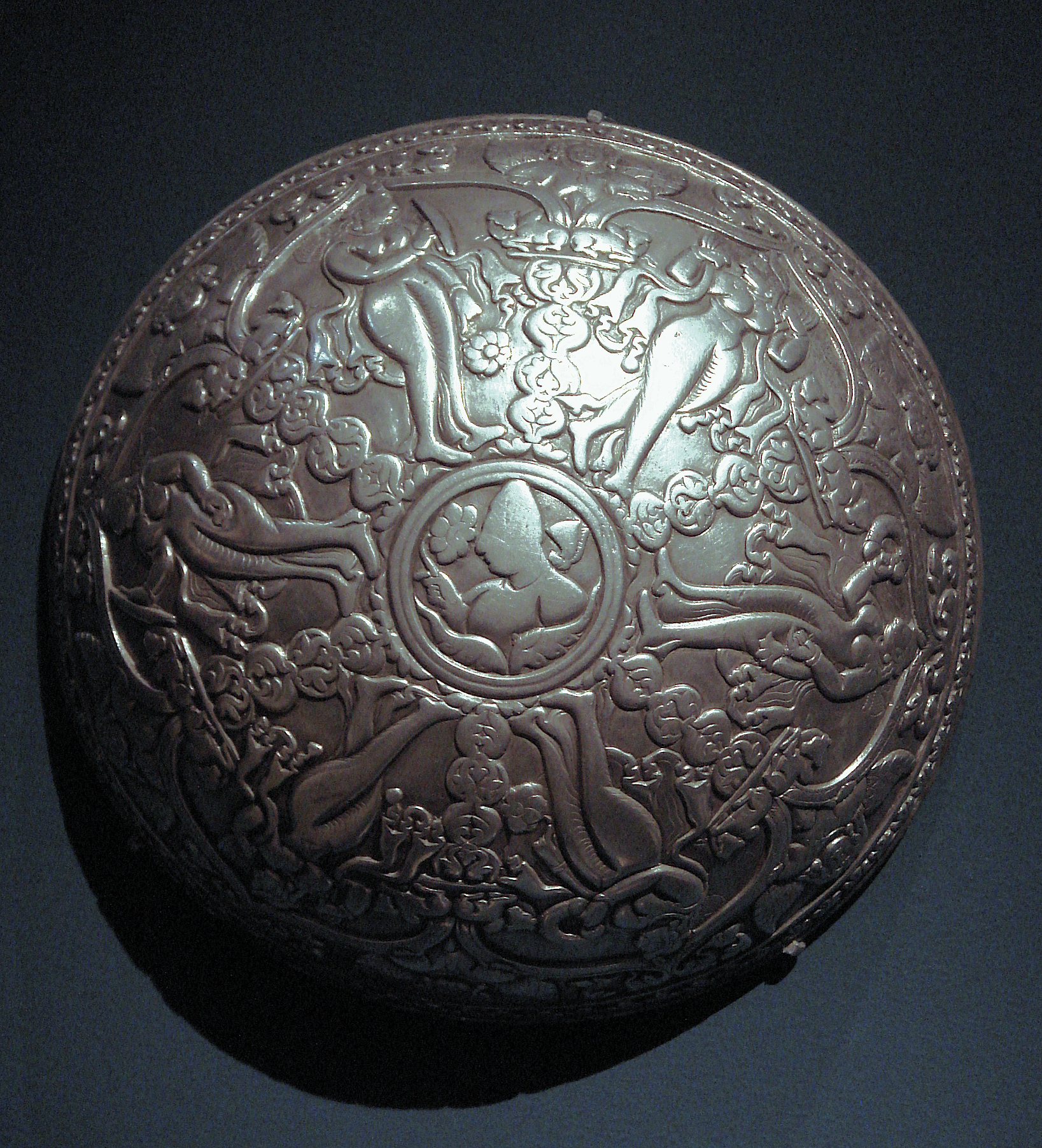
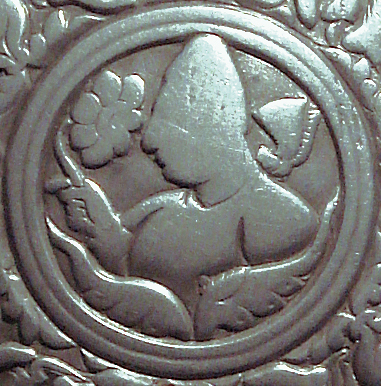
The Chilek bowl, with an Alchon Hun ruler in the central medallion, surrounded by naked Indian-style dancers.

Several silver bowls related to the Alchons have been found in the area of Samarkand, including the "Chilek bowl" ("Čilek bowl"), which is considered as the "best known specimen of Hephthalite art", and is similar in composition with the Hephthalite silver bowl, but represents "six dancers in Indian costume with Iranian ribbons and Hephthalite-short heads". Each of the dancers is positioned under a pointed arch in Indian style, and seems to be derived from contemporary Gupta art. This bowl, too, is considered as an Alchon object, but was possibly manufactured in India at the request of the Alchons. It is now in the Samarkand Museum.

The man in the medallion at the bottom of the Chilek bowl has a clearly elongated skull, characteristic of the Alchons Huns at that time and place.

=== Coinage legacy (6th-12th century CE) ===
As they invaded northern and central India circa 500 CE, the Alchon Huns issued several types of coinage on the model of the Sasanian Empire, with ruler in profile on the obverse and sacred fire with attendants on the reverse. It is thought that in the process of minting coins in occupied lands, they transmitted Sasanian coin designs to northern and western India. This created a major type of Indian coinage called "Indo-Sasanian coinage", which lasted in degraded form until the 12th century CE as far as the Gangetic region.

=== Ethnic legacy ===
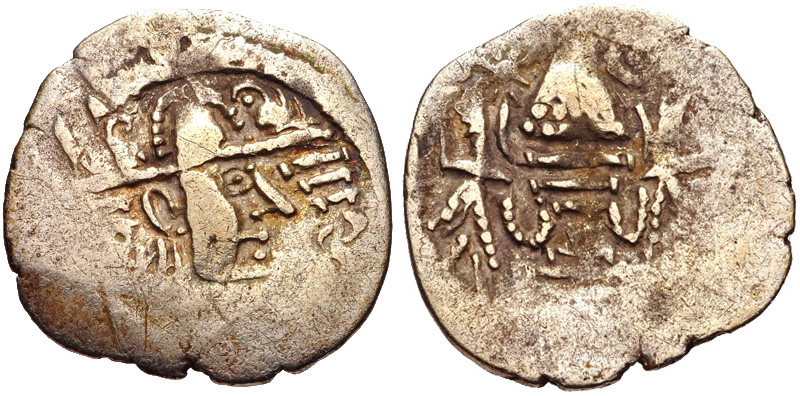
Coin of the Gurjara Confederacy, Peroz I type. Sindh, circa 570-712 CE.

The Gurjaras and Gurjara-Pratiharas suddenly emerged as a political power in north India around sixth century CE, shortly after the Hunas invasion of that region. The Gujara-Pratihara were "likely" formed from a fusion of the Alchon Huns ("White Huns") and native Indian element, and can probably be considered as a Hunnic state, although its precise origins remain unclear. In Bana's Harshacharita (7th century CE), the Gurjaras are associated with the Hunas. Some of the Hunas may also have contributed to the formation of the warlike Rajputs.

== Sources ==
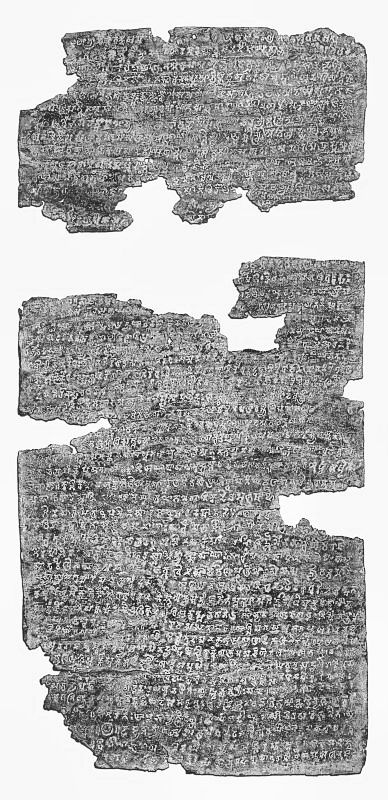
The Talagan copper scroll

Ancient sources refer to the Alchons and associated groups ambiguously with various names, such as Huna in Indian texts, and Xionites in Greek texts. Xuanzang chronicled some of the later history of the Alchons.

The references in Sanskrit sources to the dynasty of Mihirakula are of great importance as they throw light on the character of the rulers. The largest number of references is found in Kalhana's Rajatarangini.

Modern archaeology has provided valuable insights into the history of the Alchons. The most significant cataloguing of the Alchon dynasty came in 1967 with Robert Göbl's analysis of the coinage of the "Iranian Huns". This work documented the names of a partial chronology of Alchon kings, beginning with Khingila. In 2012, the Kunsthistorisches Museum completed a reanalysis of previous finds together with a large number of new coins that appeared on the antiquities market during the Second Afghan Civil War, redefining the timeline and narrative of the Alchons and related peoples.

=== Talagan copper scroll ===
A significant contribution to our understanding of Alchon history came in 2006 when Gudrun Melzer and Lore Sander published their finding of the "Talagan copper scroll", also known as the "Schøyen Copper Scroll", dated to 492 or 493, that mentions the four Alchon kings Khingila, Toramana, Javukha, and Mehama (who was reigning at the time) as donors to a Buddhist reliquary stupa. (Note: "Together with the great sahi Khingila, together with the god-king Toramana, together with the mistress of a great monastery Sasa, together with the great sahi Mehama, together with Sadavikha, together with the great king Javukha, the son of Sadavikha, during the reign of Mehama."from Gudrun Melzer; Lore Sander (2000). Jens Braarvig (ed.). A Copper Scroll Inscription from the Time of the Alchon Huns. Buddhist manuscripts. Vol. 3. Oslo: Hermes Pub. pp. 251–278. ISBN 9788280340061.) (Note: For an image of the copper scroll: Coin Cabinet of the Kunsthistorisches Museum Vienna Showcase 8)

== Rulers ==
The rulers of the Alchons practised skull deformation, as evidenced from their coins, a practice shared with the Huns that migrated into Europe. The names of the first Alchon rulers do not survive. Starting from 430 CE, names of Alchon kings survive on coins and religious inscriptions:

- anonymous kings (400 - 430 CE)
- Khingila (c. 430 – 490 CE)
- Javukha/Zabocho (c. mid 5th – early 6th CE)
- Mehama (c. 461 – 493 CE)
- Lakhana Udayaditya (c. 490's CE)
- Aduman
- Toramana (c. 490 – 515 CE)
- Mihirakula (c. 515 – 540 CE)
- Toramana II (c. 530 – 570 CE)
- Pravarasena (c. 530 – 590 CE)
- Gokarna (c. 570 – 590 CE)
- Narendraditya Khinkhila (c. 590 – 630 CE)
- Yudhishthira (630-670 CE)

== Coinage ==
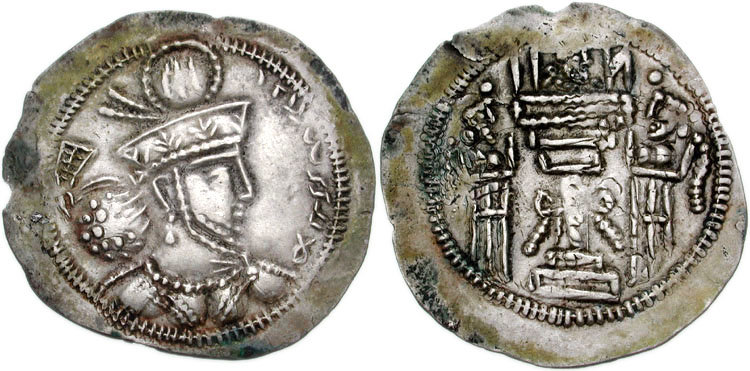
An early Alchon Huns coin based on a Sasanian design, with bust imitating Sasanian king Shapur III. Only the legend "Alchono" appears on the obverse in the Greco-Bactrian script.

Early Bactrian coinage based on Sasanian designs

The earliest Alchon Hun coins were based on Sasanian designs, often with the simple addition of the Alchon tamgha and a mention of "Alchon" or "Alkhan". Various coins minted in Bactria and based on Sasanian designs are known, often with busts imitating Sasanian kings Shapur II (r.309 to 379 CE) and Shapur III (r.383 to 388 CE), with attendants to a fire altar on the reverse. It is thought that the Sasanids lost control of Bactria to the Kidarites during the reign of Shapur II circa 370 CE, followed by the Hephthalites, and subsequently by the Alchon.

Later original coinage

Later Alchon coinage became original and differed from predecessors in that it was devoid of Iranian (Sasanian) symbolism. The rulers are depicted with elongated skulls, apparently a result of artificial cranial deformation.

After their invasion of India the coins of the Alchon were numerous and varied, as they issued copper, silver and gold coins, sometimes roughly following the Gupta pattern. The Alchon empire in India must have been quite significant and rich, with the ability to issue a significant volume of gold coins.

=== Coinage ===
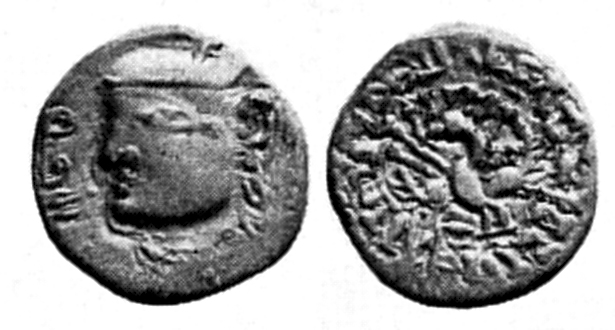
Silver coin of Toramana in Western Gupta style, with the Gupta peacock and Brahmi legend on the reverse. Similar to the silver coin type of Skandagupta. On the obverse the date "52" is also inscribed. A modern Image:.

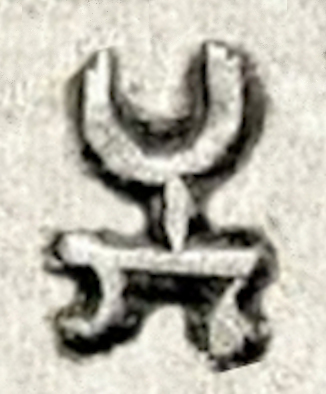
Alchon Tamgha symbol on a coin of Khingila.

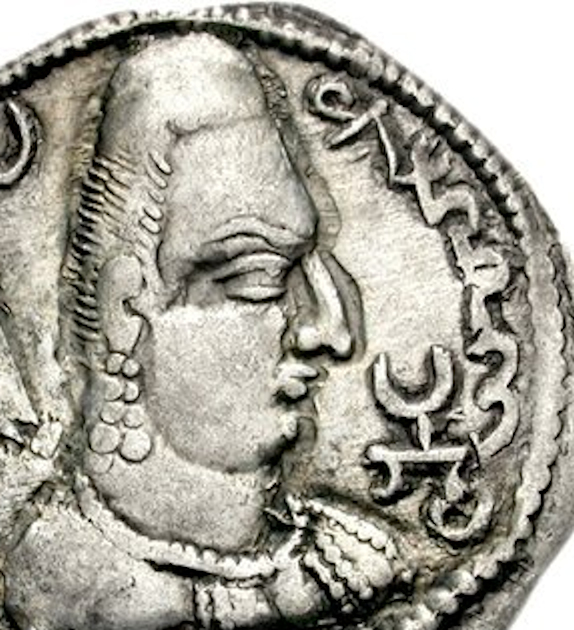
Khingila with the word "Alchono" in Bactrian script (αλχονο) and the Tamgha symbol on his coins.

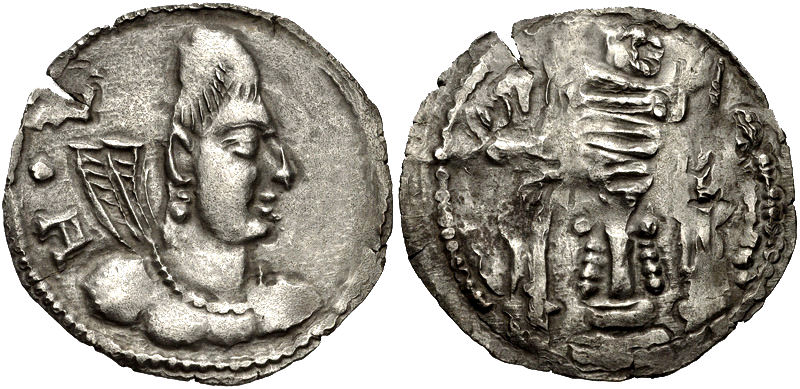
Silver drachm of Khingila (early portrait) without headdress, mid-late 5th century. (Note: For equivalent coin, see CNG Coins)

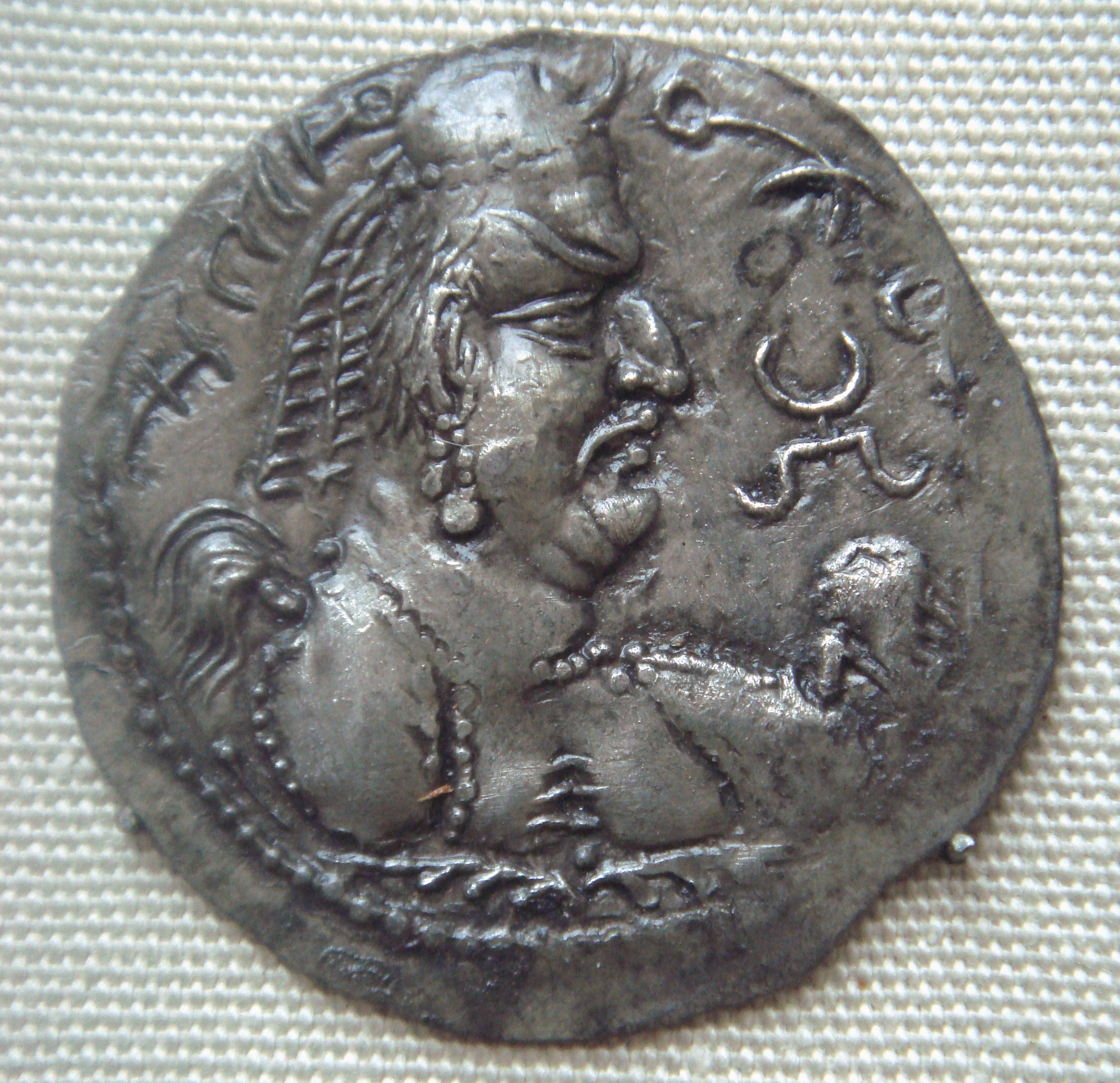
Silver drachm of Khingila (mature portrait), Bactrian legend: χιγγιλο αλχοννο "Khiggilo Alchono". (Note: This coin is in the collection of the British Museum. For equivalent coin, see CNG Coins)

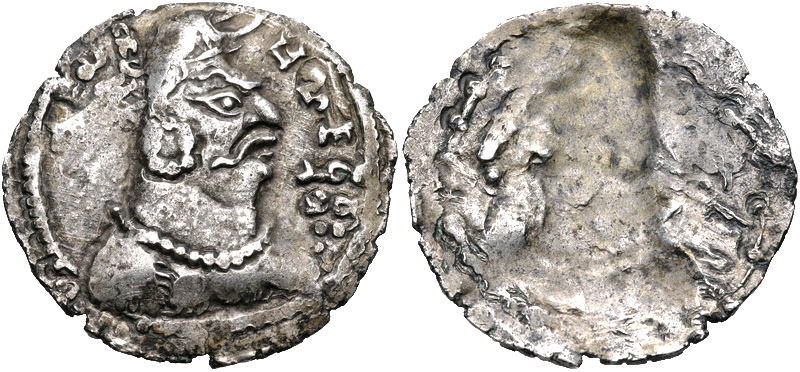
Silver drachm of Javukha, mid-late 5th century.

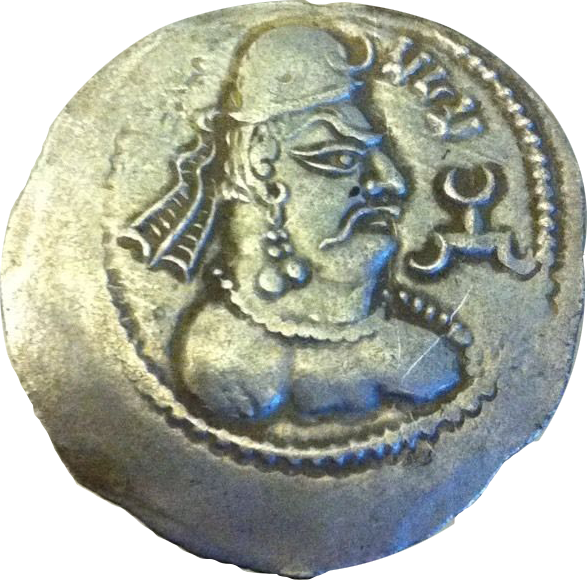
Silver drachm of Mehama legend: “ṣāhi mehama", mid-late 5th century.

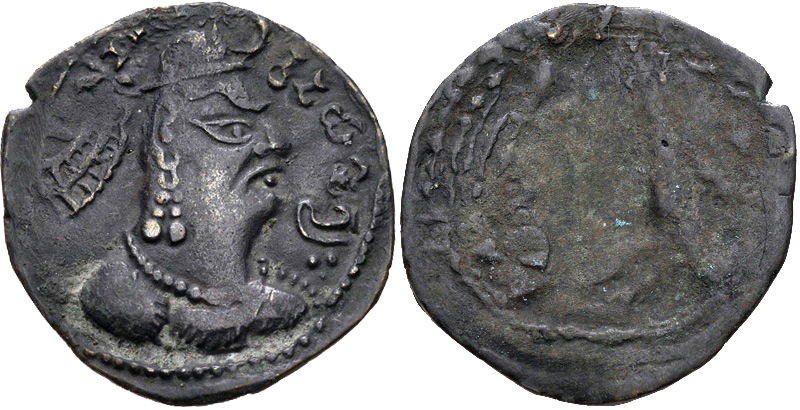
Silver drachm of Lakhana, late 5th-early 6th centuries.

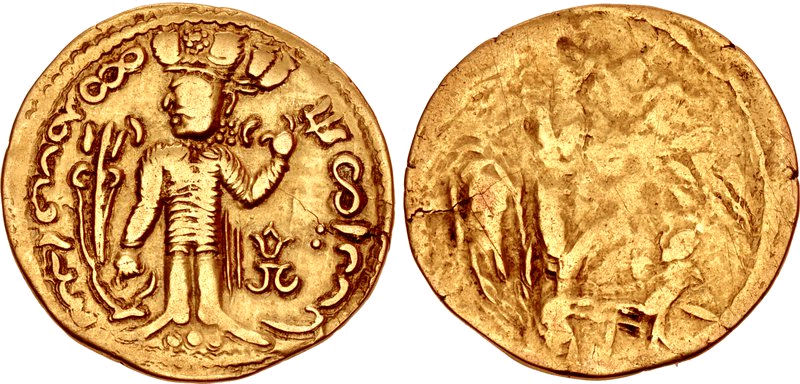
Gold dinar of Adomano, Kushano-Sasanian style, mid-late 5th century.

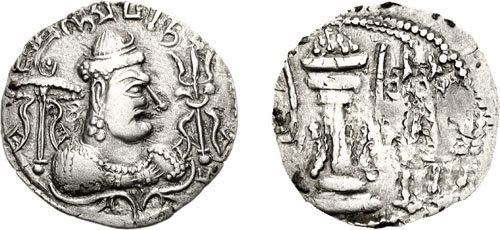
Silver drachm of Mihirakula, early-mid 6th century.

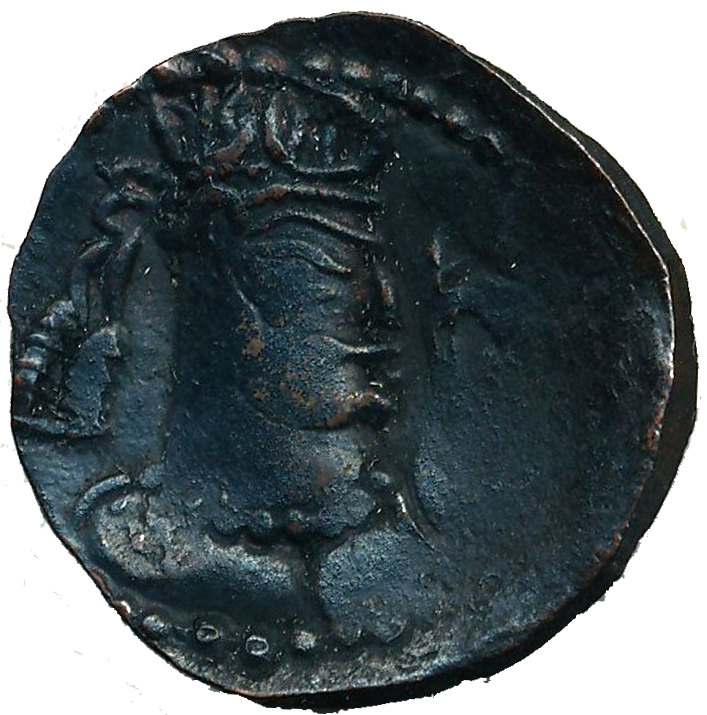
Bronze drachm of Toramana II wearing trident crown, late-phase Gandharan style. mid 6th century.

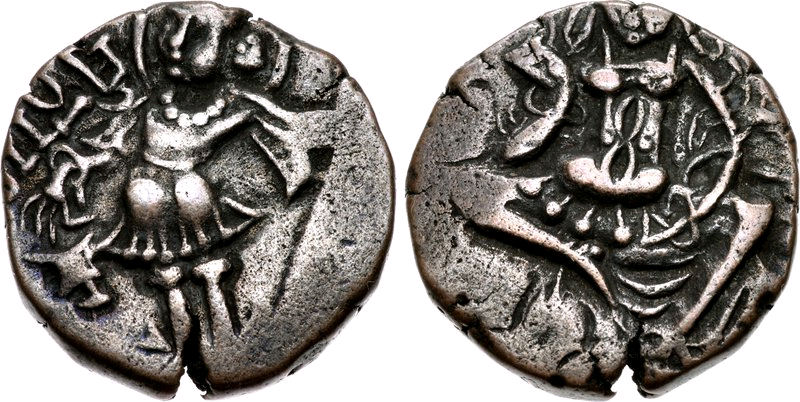
Silver stater of Toramana II, Kashmir style, mid-late 6th century.

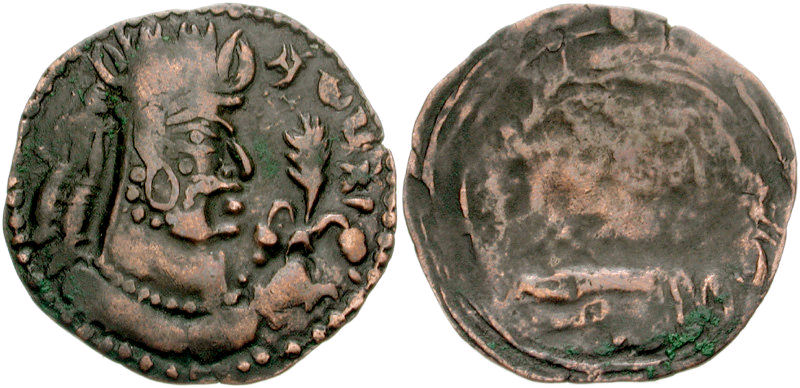
Bronze drachm of Narana-Narenda (possibly Toramana II) wearing trident crown, late 6th century.

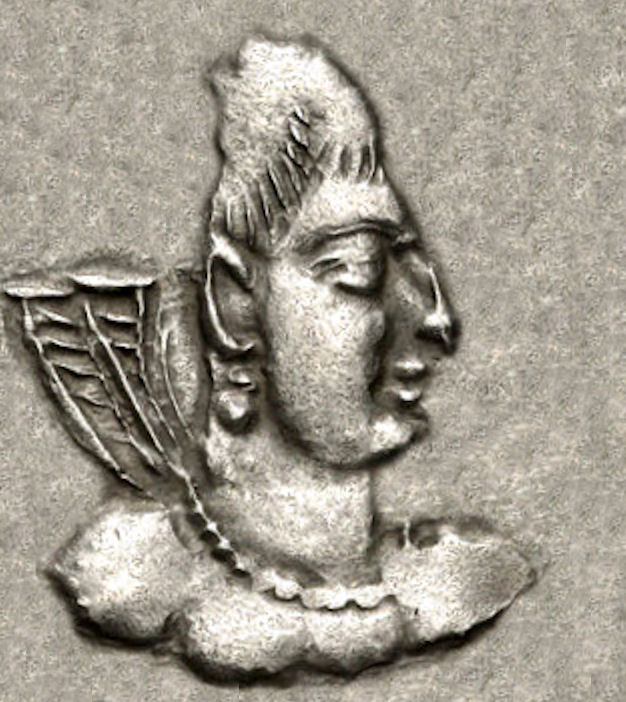
Khingila as a young king, without headdress. Artificial cranial deformation clearly visible.

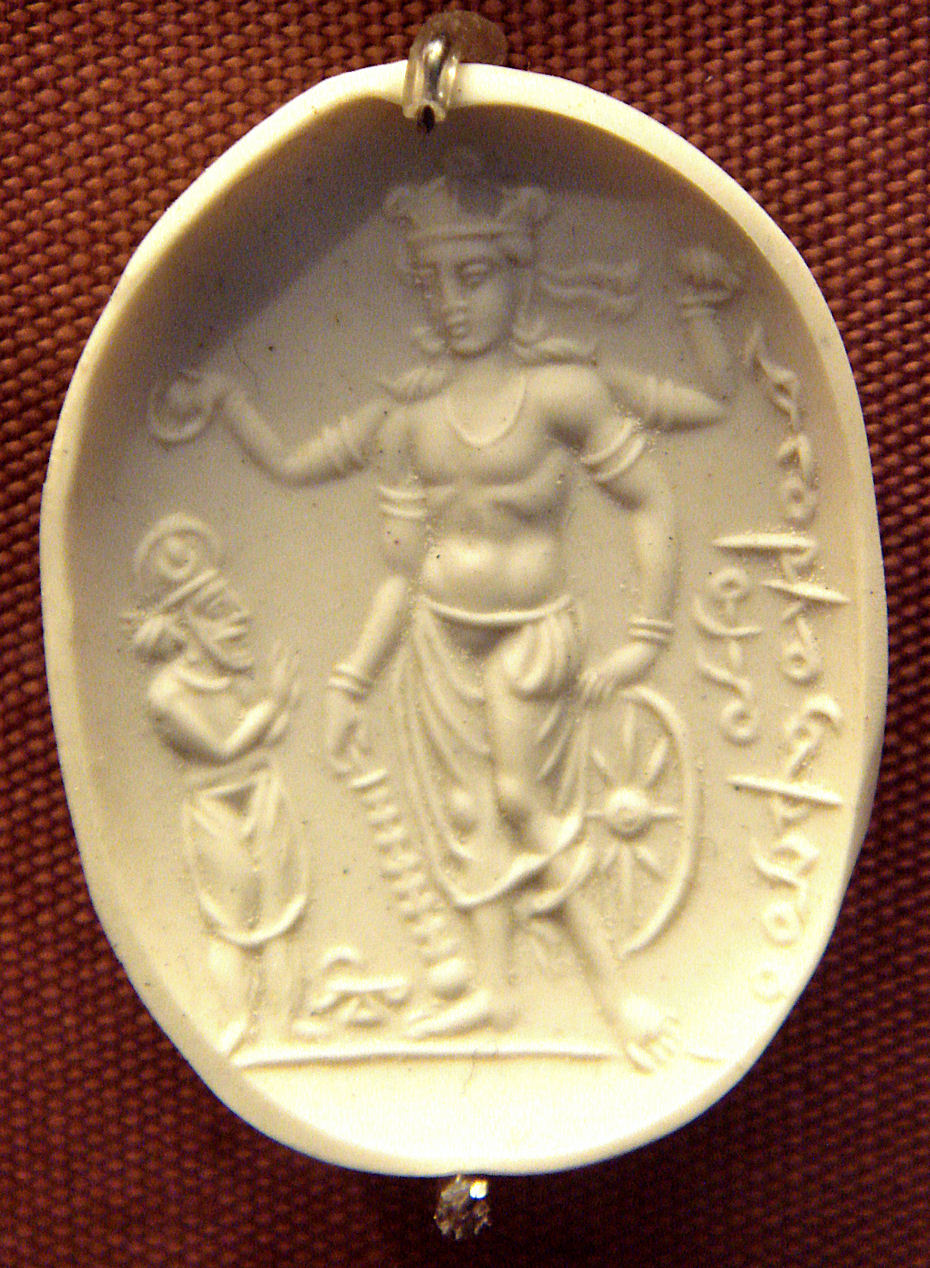
Vishnu Nicolo Seal representing Vishnu with a worshipper (probably Mihirakula), 4th–6th century CE. The inscription in cursive Bactrian reads: "Mihira, Vishnu and Shiva". British Museum.

== Sources ==
- Alemanny, Agustí (2000). Sources on the Alans: A Critical Compilation. Brill. ISBN 978-90-04-11442-5.
- Puri, Baij Nath (1957), The history of the Gurjara-Pratihāras, Munshiram Manoharlal
- Bakker, Hans T. (2020). The Alkhan: A Hunnic People in South Asia. Barkhuis. doi:10.2307/j.ctv13nb6sv. ISBN 978-94-93194-00-7. JSTOR j.ctv13nb6sv.
- Rezakhani, Khodadad (2017). ReOrienting the Sasanians: East Iran in Late Antiquity. Edinburgh University Press. doi:10.1515/9781474400305. ISBN 978-1-4744-0030-5.
- Schindel, Nikolaus (2006). The Sasanian Eastern Wars in the 5th Century. The Numismatic Evidence. Milan.
- Schottky, Martin (2004). "Huns". Encyclopaedia Iranica.
- Vondrovec, Klaus (2005). Die Anonymen Clanchefs (in German).

Timeline and cultural period	Indus plain (Punjab-Sapta Sindhu-Gujarat)	Gangetic Plain			Central India	Southern India
Timeline and cultural period	Indus plain (Punjab-Sapta Sindhu-Gujarat)	Upper Gangetic Plain (Ganga-Yamuna doab)	Middle Gangetic Plain	Lower Gangetic Plain	Central India	Southern India
IRON AGE
Culture	Late Vedic Period	Late Vedic Period; Painted Grey Ware culture	Late Vedic Period; Northern Black Polished Ware		Pre-history	
6th century BCE	Gandhara	Kuru-Panchala	Magadha		Adivasi (tribes)	Assaka
Culture	Persian-Greek influences	"Second Urbanisation"; Rise of Shramana movements Jainism - Buddhism - Ājīvika - Yoga			Pre-history	
5th century BCE	(Persian conquests)		Shaishunaga dynasty		Adivasi (tribes)	Assaka
4th century BCE	(Greek conquests)	Nanda empire				
HISTORICAL AGE
Culture	Spread of Buddhism				Pre-history	
3rd century BCE	Maurya Empire					Satavahana dynasty Sangam period (300 BCE – 200 CE); Early Cholas; Early Pandyan kingdom Cheras
Culture	Preclassical Hinduism (Note: Michaels (2004) p.39) - "Hindu Synthesis" (Note: Hiltebeitel (2002)) (ca. 200 BCE - 300 CE) (Note: Michaels (2004) p.39) (Note: Hiltebeitel (2002)); Epics - Puranas - Ramayana - Mahabharata - Bhagavad Gita - Brahma Sutras - Smarta Tradition; Mahayana Buddhism					
2nd century BCE	Indo-Greek Kingdom		Shunga Empire; Maha-Meghavahana Dynasty			Satavahana dynasty Sangam period (300 BCE – 200 CE); Early Cholas; Early Pandyan kingdom Cheras
1st century BCE	Indo-Greek Kingdom		Shunga Empire; Maha-Meghavahana Dynasty			Satavahana dynasty Sangam period (300 BCE – 200 CE); Early Cholas; Early Pandyan kingdom Cheras
1st century CE	Indo-Scythians; Indo-Parthians		Kuninda Kingdom			Satavahana dynasty Sangam period (300 BCE – 200 CE); Early Cholas; Early Pandyan kingdom Cheras
2nd century	Kushan Empire					Satavahana dynasty Sangam period (300 BCE – 200 CE); Early Cholas; Early Pandyan kingdom Cheras
3rd century	Kushano-Sasanian Kingdom; Western Satraps	Kushan Empire		Kamarupa kingdom	Adivasi (tribes)	Satavahana dynasty Sangam period (300 BCE – 200 CE); Early Cholas; Early Pandyan kingdom Cheras
Culture	"Golden Age of Hinduism"(ca. CE 320-650) (Note: Michaels (2004) p.40); Puranas - Kural; Co-existence of Hinduism and Buddhism					
4th century	Kidarites	Gupta Empire; Varman dynasty				Andhra Ikshvakus; Kalabhra dynasty Kadamba Dynasty; Western Ganga Dynasty
5th century	Hephthalite Empire	Alchon Huns				Vishnukundina; Kalabhra dynasty
6th century	Nezak Huns; Kabul Shahi; Maitraka				Adivasi (tribes)	Vishnukundina; Badami Chalukyas; Kalabhra dynasty
Culture	Late-Classical Hinduism (ca. CE 650-1100) (Note: Michaels (2004) p.41); Advaita Vedanta - Tantra; Decline of Buddhism in India					
7th century	Indo-Sassanids		Vakataka dynasty Empire of Harsha	Mlechchha dynasty	Adivasi (tribes)	Badami Chalukyas; Eastern Chalukyas; Pandyan kingdom (revival); Pallava
7th century	Karkota dynasty				Adivasi (tribes)	
8th century	Kabul Shahi	Pala Empire			Adivasi (tribes)	Eastern Chalukyas; Pandyan kingdom Kalachuri
9th century	Gurjara-Pratihara				Adivasi (tribes)	Rashtrakuta Empire; Eastern Chalukyas; Pandyan kingdom Medieval Cholas; Chera Perumals of Makkotai
10th century	Ghaznavids			Pala dynasty Kamboja-Pala dynasty	Adivasi (tribes)	Kalyani Chalukyas; Eastern Chalukyas; Medieval Cholas; Chera Perumals of Makkotai; Rashtrakuta
References and sources for table References Sources: Flood, Gavin D. (1996), An Introduction to Hinduism, Cambridge University Press; Hiltebeitel, Alf (2002), Hinduism. In: Joseph Kitagawa, "The Religious Traditions of Asia: Religion, History, and Culture", Routledge; Michaels, Axel (2004), Hinduism. Past and present, Princeton, New Jersey: Princeton University Press
