= Yudhishthira (Huna king) =

Possible ruler of the Alchon Huns

- Ruler of the Alchon Huns
- Reign: c. 630-670
- Predecessor: Narendraditya Khinkhila

Approximate area of Kashmir

Yudhishthira has been proposed as the last Alchon Hun ruler of Kashmir, according to a reconstruction made by Atreyi Biswas. The tentative identification has been made from the lists of Huna kings given in the Puranas and the Rajatarangini.

The name of Yudhishthira I is mentioned twice in the first and third book of Rajatarangini, and Biswas assumes both to be the in reference to the same person. The Rajatarangini describes him as the son of a ruler named Narendraditya Khinkhila, who has been identified with the historically known Alchon Hun ruler Narendraditya Khinkhila (597-633). According to this identification, Yudhishthira I would have succeeded his father circa 633 and went on to rule for 40 years until c. 670 CE (or for 24 years until c. 657 CE), before being dethroned by Pratapaditya of the Karkota dynasty. Yudhishtira is said to have been nicknamed "Andha-Yudhishthira" because he had small eyes.

According to Kalhana, Yudhishthira was the last great Huna ruler, though he still produced a line of successors who were all subordinate rulers in Kashmir. With the final reign of Yudhishthira and the end of Huna independent rule, new politics arose, such as the Turk Shahis in the areas of Kabul and Gandhara circa 666 CE.

Alternatively, Joe Cribb proposes that Yudhishthira was actually the son of an earlier Alchon Hun king named Khingila, which would date him after the end of the 4th century CE.

There does not exist any direct historical evidence of Yudhishthira I.
