= Aydogdy Kurbanov =

Turkmen archaeologist and historian

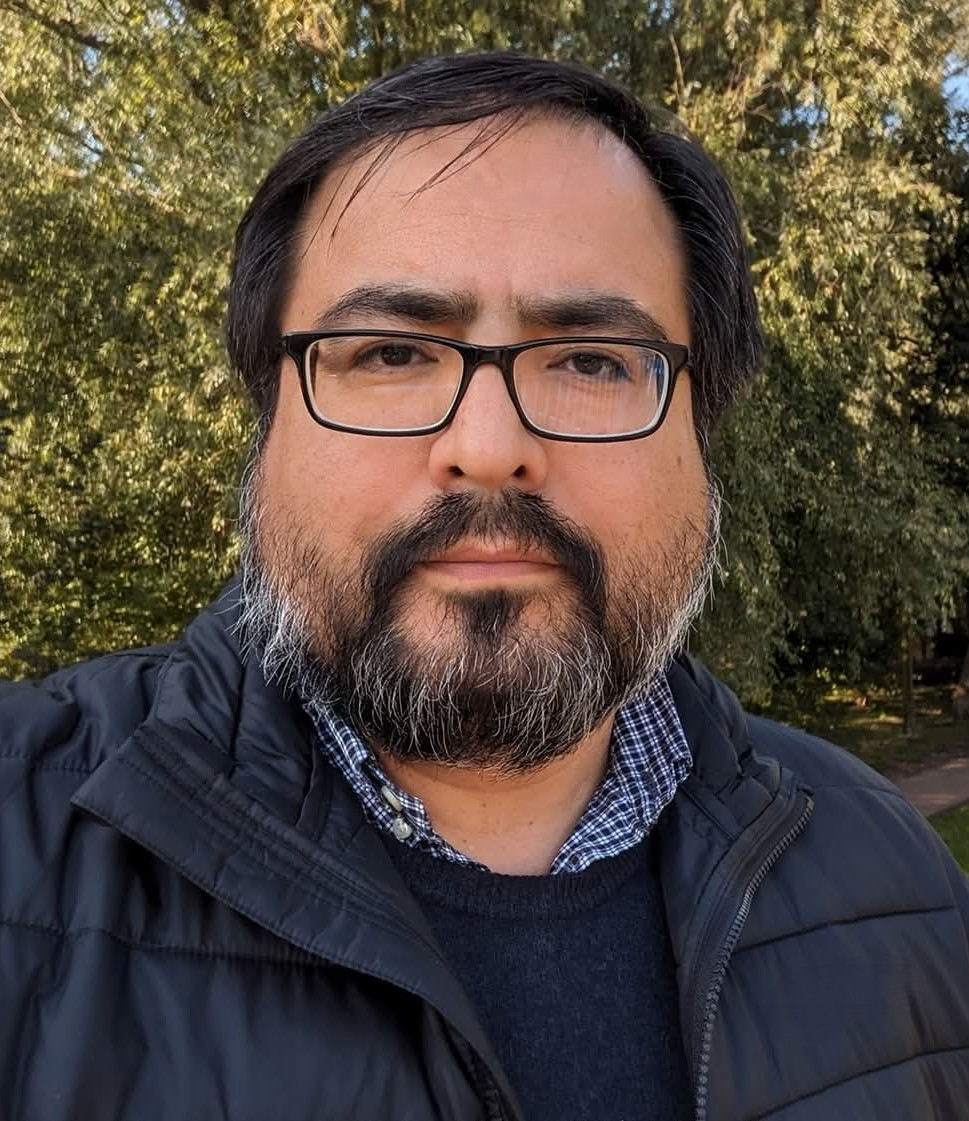
- Born: 2 February 1976; Ashgabat, Turkmenistan
- Occupations: Archaeologist; Historian

Academic background
- Education: Doctor of Philosophy
- Alma mater: Free University of Berlin (Ph.D.)
- Thesis: The Hephthalites: Archaeological and Historical Analysis (Ph.D.) (2010)

Academic work
- Discipline: Archaeology; History
- Institutions: Research fellow at the Institute for the Study of the Ancient World, New York University
- Main interests: Central Asia and neighbouring regions

Aydogdy Kurbanov (in Turkmen: Aýdogdy Gurbanow, born 2 February 1976, in Ashgabat, Turkmen Soviet Socialist Republic, USSR) is a Turkmen archaeologist and historian whose main area of research is prehistoric and late antiquity of Central Asia.

Born in Ashgabat, Turkmenistan, he graduated from the Turkmen State University named after Magtymguly and he did a Ph.D. at the Free University of Berlin and has been a postdoctoral researcher in archaeology and history at the Academy of Sciences of Turkmenistan. He has been the head of department of archaeology of the Academy's Institute of Archaeology and Ethnography.

== Education ==
Kurbanov completed a Ph.D. from the Free University of Berlin, Germany. He has been a 'Gerda Henkel visiting research fellow' at the German Archaeological Institute.

He speaks multiple languages including English, Russian, Turkish, Turkmen, and German.

== Career and research ==
Kurbanov has been a postdoctoral researcher in the field of history and archaeology at the Institute of Archaeology and Ethnography of the Academy of Sciences of Turkmenistan, with "The Eastern frontiers of the Sasanian Empire: Case Study in Southern Turkmenistan" as his research project. He has served as the head of the institute's Department of Archaeology. He has also worked at the Eurasian department of the German Archaeological Institute in Berlin. From January to April 2007, he worked at the University of Pennsylvania's Department of East Asian Languages and Civilizations on the research project "State Building by the Hephthalites (White Huns) in the Fourth Through Sixth Centuries" under the Fulbright Scholar Program.

With financial grants from National Geographic, he executed two research projects in Turkmenistan, namely "Defining the Eastern Frontiers of the Sasanian Empire. Survey in the Ancient Abiverd and Merv Regions. (from 1 July 2014 to 30 June 2015)" and "Exploring the Neolithic to Chalcolithic Transition in Central Asia. Excavations in Dashly-depe. (from 1 March 2018 to 28 February 2019)".

From June 1 to July 2018, he was a guest researcher for the Directeurs d’Études Associés (Associate Research Directors) programme, which is the "oldest international mobility programme" at the Fondation Maison des Sciences de l'Homme (Foundation House of Human Sciences), that was started in 1975 by the joint efforts of the French Secretary of State for Universities, Department for Higher Education and Research, and Fernand Braudel. He has also excavated in Turkmenistan. He was a research fellow at the Institute of Ancient Near Eastern Archaeology of the Free University of Berlin. In 2023-2024 he was a visiting scholar at the Oxford Nizami Ganjavi Centre, University of Oxford. In 2025, he was elected as a corresponding member of the German Archaeological Institute.

== Works ==
=== Books ===
Some of the books authored and coauthored by Kurbanov are as follows:

- Kurbanov, A. (2013). The History and Archaeology of the Hephthalites. Bonn, Germany: Habelt Verlag.
- Hojaniyazov, T.; Kurbanov, A.; Ovlyagulyev, M. (2011). Great Silk Road and Turkmenistan. Ashgabat, Turkmenistan.
- Gundogdiyev, O.; Hojaniyazov, T.; Kurbanov, A. (2010). Akdepe – The Ancient Archaeological Site of Turkmenistan. Ashgabat, Turkmenistan.
- Kurbanov, A. (2006). The Hephthalites (in Russian). St. Petersburg, Russia.

=== Research papers ===
Some of the research papers authored by Kurbanov are as follows:

- Kurbanov, A. "The Socio-political Structure in Central Asia at the 5th – 6th centuries CE". Universidad Autónoma de Madrid. Madrid, Spain.
- Kurbanov, A. (14 September 2018). "A Brief History of Archaeological Research in Turkmenistan from the Beginning of the 20th century until the Present". ArchéOrient – Le Blog. Lyon, France. doi:10.58079/bcxm.
- Kurbanov, A. (2013). "The Hephthalites Disappeared or Not? Studia et Documenta Turciologica". Journal of the Institute of Turkology and Central Asian Studies. Cluj-Napoca, Romania: Babeș-Bolyai University: 87–94.
- Kurbanov, A. (2013). "The Hephthalite Numismatics". Tyragetia. 7 (22). Chișinău, Moldova: National Museum of Moldova: 369–380.
- Kurbanov, A. (2004). "Genesis of the Hephthalites. Historiography of the Problem". Cultural Values (International Annual) (in Russian): 45–55.
