= Toramana II =

Huna King

- Ruler of the Alchon Huns
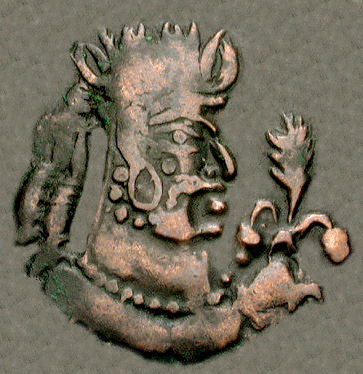
- Portrait of Toramana II, from his coinage. Approximate location of Toramana II's territory
- Reign: 6th century CE

Toramana II (Gupta script: Śrī Toramāṇa, "Lord Toramana") was a ruler of the Alchon Huns in the 6th century CE.

== Confrontation with the Nezaks ==
Around the middle of the 6th century CE, the Alchons, after having extensively invaded the heartland of India, had withdrawn from Kashmir, Punjab and Gandhara, and going back west across the Khyber Pass they resettled in Kabulistan. It seems that there was a direct confrontation between the Alchon Toramana II and the Nezaks in Kabulistan, as he made overstrikes of Nezak coins, and at the same time adopted the Nezak bull's head in his own crown in some of his coins minted in Gandhara.

The legend of the coins of Toramana II were previously mistakenly read as "srī nara" and "nara", leading to suggestions that there was an Alchon Hun king named "Narana" or "Narendra". Since a 2013 study by Matthias Pfisterer, it has been recognized that the legends on these coins should be read as "srī tora" and "tora", hence the attribution to a "Toramana II". According to Michael Alram, the supposed king "Narana" or "Narendra" should be "deleted without substitution".

The coins of Toramana II in Kabulistan generally have the mention "His Excellence, King Tora", and some of them are overstrikes over Nezak coins.

== Coinage ==
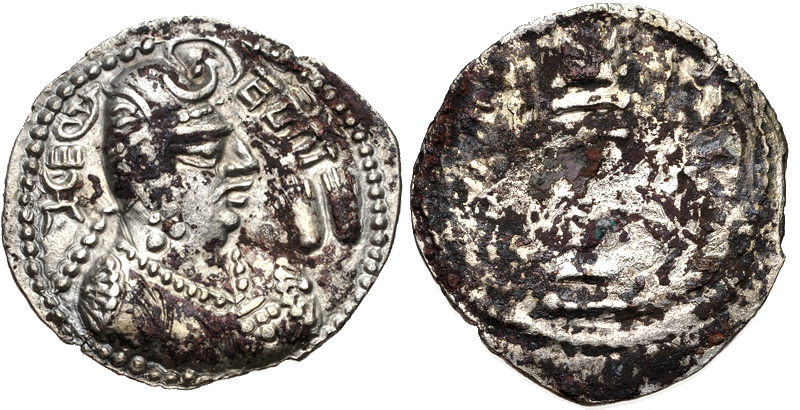
A coin in the name of "Sri Tora" in (Gupta script:)

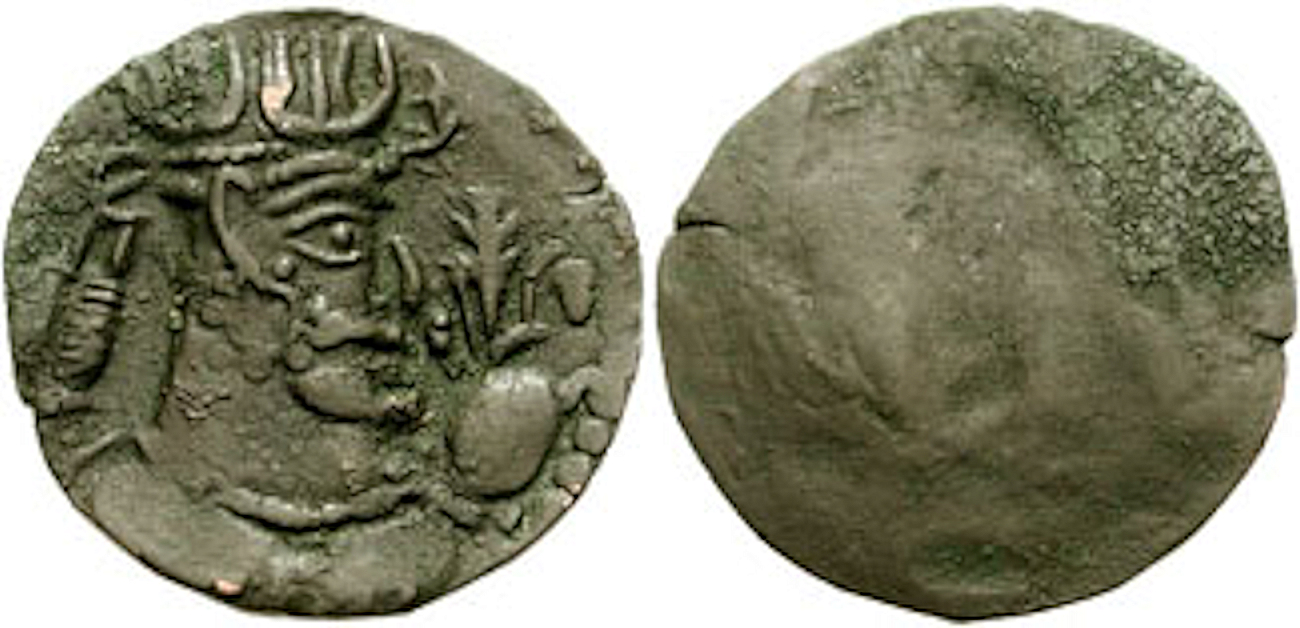
Coin of Toramana II Circa 540 CE. Circa 540 CE. Æ 22mm "Drachm" (3.75 gm). Crowned head right with diadem and two trident patterns

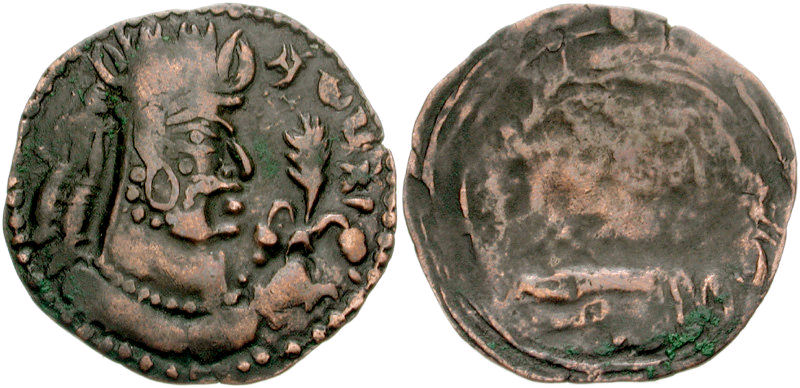
Another coin of Toramana II, again with the name.

== Toramana II of Kashmir ==
A more sophisticated type of coinage from Kashmir is also known that bears the name "Toramana", and is often called "Toramana II" in numismatic studies. It is dated to the end the 6th-7th century CE. This coin type belongs to another ruler, Toramana of Kashmir, a probable descendant of the Alchon Huns in Kashmir, and may bear a relation with the "Toramana" of the Gonanda dynasty (II) mentioned in Kalhana's Rajatarangini.

== Sources ==
- Alram, Michael (2014). "From the Sasanians to the Huns New Numismatic Evidence from the Hindu Kush". The Numismatic Chronicle. 174: 261–291. ISSN 0078-2696.

Regnal titles
Preceded by Mihirakula	King of the Alchon Huns; 530-570	Succeeded by Alchon-Nezak rulers
