= Shashanka =

Maharajadhiraja of Gauda from c. 593 to 636

- Maharajadhiraja; Gaudeshwar; Gaudabhujanga
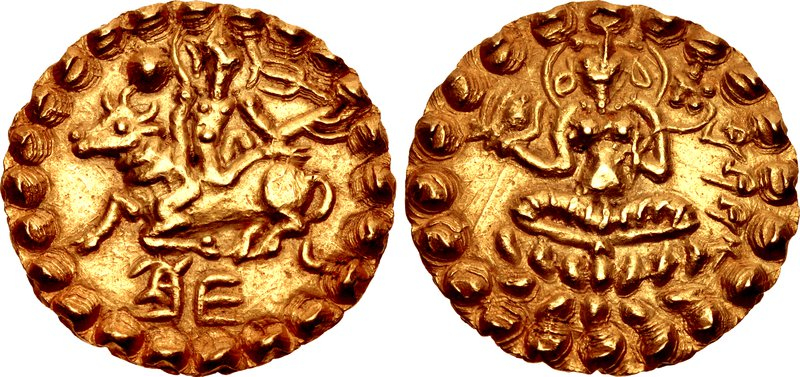
- Coin minted during the reign of Shashanka depicting Shiva (left) and Shashanka himself (right)

Maharajadhiraja of Gauda
- Reign: 593 – 636 C.E
- Predecessor: Jayanaga
- Successor: Manava
- Born: 575
- Died: 636 (aged 59–60)
- Issue: Manava
- Dynasty: Gauda Rajvansha
- Religion: Hinduism (Shaivism)
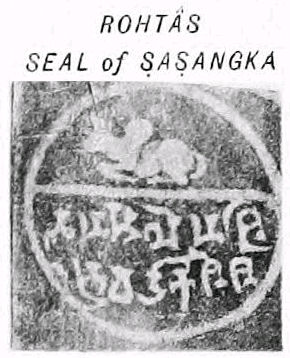
- Imperial Seal

Shashanka (IAST: Śaśāṅka) was king of the Gauda Kingdom, a polity of the later Gupta dynasty and later its successor state. Historians place his rule between 600 and 636, whereas other sources place his reign between 590 and 625. making his lasted approximately from 593 to 636.

He is the contemporary of Harsha and of Bhaskaravarman of Kamarupa. His capital was at Karnasuvarna in present day India. He is credited with creating the Bengali calendar.

== Contemporary sources ==
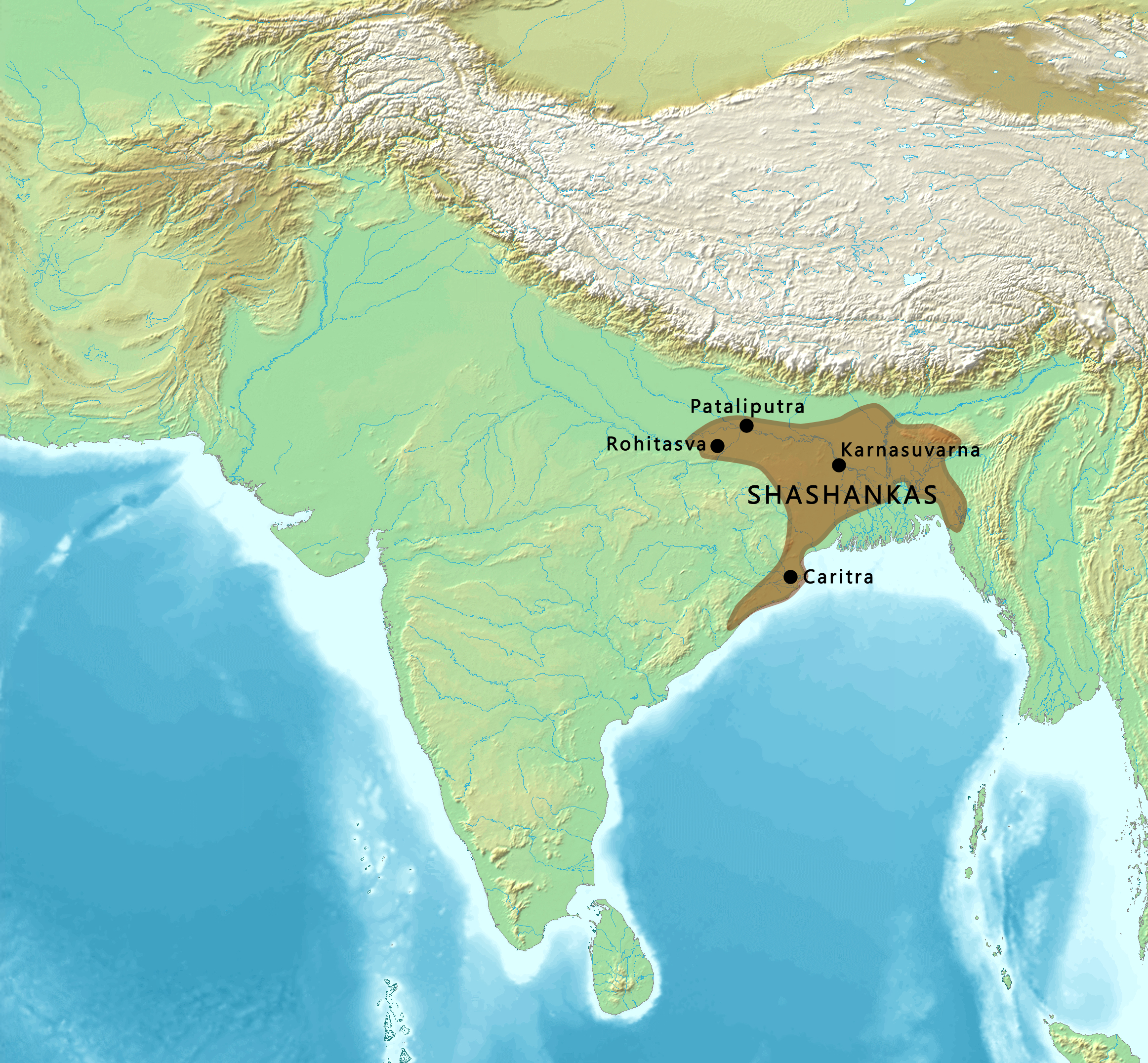
Map of the Shashankas or "Gauda Kingdom", circa 600 CE.

There are several major contemporary sources of information on his life, including copper plates from his vassal Madhavavarma (king of Ganjam), copper plates of his rivals Harsha and Bhaskaravarman, the accounts of Banabhatta, who was a bard in the court of Harsha, and of the Chinese monk Xuanzang, and also coins minted in Shashanka's reign.

== Early life ==
Little is known about the early life of Shashanka. The historian D. K. Ganguly proposed that Shashanka was a native of Magadha who initially served as a high feudatory under the Maukhari kings Avantivarman and Grahavarman before eventually conquering Magadha and invading Gauda.

Epigraphic evidence strongly links his early career to the Later Gupta dynasty. A seal-matrix discovered at the hill fort of Rohtasgarh in Rohtas district refers to him as a Mahasamanta (great feudatory), demonstrating that he began his career as a military governor of this vital Magadhan defence outpost under the Later Gupta ruler Mahasenagupta.

Historians such as Padmanath Bhattacharya suggested that Shashanka was a biological son of Mahasenagupta, and R. D. Banerji similarly argued he was a direct descendant of the Magadha branch of the Guptas. While these genealogical links are disputed by B. P. Sinha and John Middleton due to a lack of direct inheritance records, they nonetheless highlight his deep integration into the Gupta political sphere.

The historian, B.N. Srivastava has rejected the theory of Shashanka being from Magadha. Primary and contemporary sources firmly associate Shashanka with the Gauda region. The court poet Bāṇabhaṭṭa explicitly designates him as Gaudarāja (King of Gauda), while the Chinese traveler Xuanzang unequivocally identifies him as the ruler of Karnasuvarna. Had Magadha been Shashanka's native homeland, there is no logical explanation for why he would rule his home territories from Karnasuvarna, nor why contemporary accounts would exclusively label him a ruler of Gauda.

The debate surrounding Shashanka's lineage is closely tied to the ancestral origin of the Imperial Guptas. While older and weaker historiography traditionally associated the early Guptas with Magadha or eastern Uttar Pradesh, more grounded epigraphic and literary evidence places their ancestral home in Varendra (northern Bengal). This position is supported by the travelogues of the 7th-century Chinese Buddhist monk Yijing, who recorded that the dynasty's founder, Sri Gupta, built a temple for Chinese pilgrims near Mṛgaśikhāvana, a location identified by historians as being situated in Varendra. According to this greater framework, the dynasty originated as a local power in northern Bengal before progressively expanding its authority westward into Magadha.

=== Names and titles ===
Shashanka's name appears across epigraphic and literary records in multiple forms, including Śaśānka and Śaśānka-deva. Derived from Sanskrit, the name translates to "Moon" or "Moon-god," mirroring the epithet of the Hindu god Shiva (Shashankasekhara—"He who wears the moon").

In his travelogues, the Chinese monk Xuanzang transliterated his name as She-Shang-Kia. Shashanka is also referred to as Śaśānka Gaur, which historically linked him to the Gauda region. In B. P. Sinha's Dynastic History of Magadha, the names "Śaśānka" and "Soma" (both meaning Moon) are used interchangeably.

== Rise to power ==
The Gupta Empire saw a series of vulnerable monarch after the death of Skandagupta in 467 C.E. On top of that, starting circa 480 C.E. Alchon Hun armies began attacking the declining empire from multiple sides. Defence of the vast empire put a strain on the royal treasury. Though the Huns were initially driven out, the protracted invasions quickened the downfall of the Gupta kings. It may be noted that Indian archaeologist Shanker Sharma has argued that the empire's end was precipitated by a massive deluge around the middle of the sixth century C.E.

Near the end of the sixth century, the empire was ruled over by a feeble ruler belonging to the Later Gupta dynasty, Mahasenagupta (r. c. 562-601 C.E.). The decline of the Gupta empire had left the disintegrating empire in chaos. Numerous local kings and rulers like Yashodharman emerged, and started vying for control of the many pieces of the former empire. Shashanka emerged as one of these ambitious local rulers, aiming to seize control of Gauda and its surrounding region.

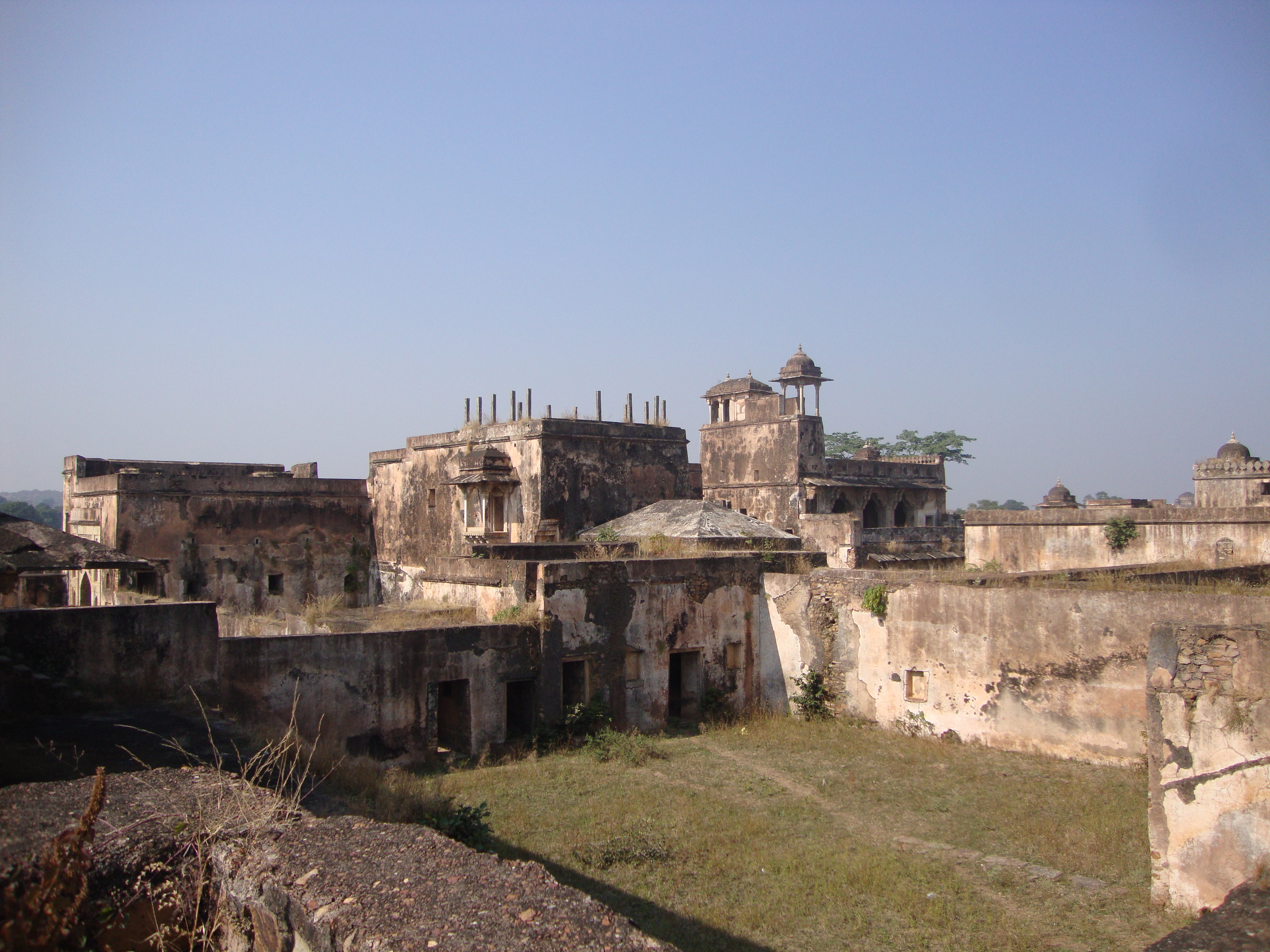
The Rohtasgarh Fort, built circa 7th century

The first mention of Shashanka is found in the 7th century hill fort Rohtasgarh in the small town of Rohtas in the kingdom of Magadha. The seal bore a curt inscription, "Mahasamanta Shashankadeva" which John Faithfull Fleet identified as Shashanka.

Some historians believe that Shashanka began his career as a feudatory chief (maha samanta) under Mahasenagupta, of the Later Gupta Dynasty. And that after the death of Mahasenagupta, Shashanka drove the later Guptas and other prominent nobles out of the region and established his own kingdom with his capital at Karnasubarna. Other historians like Sailendra Nath Sen are of the opinion that Mahasenagupta - already under pressure from the Maukharis (for failing to provide adequate protection) - wouldn't have knowingly appointed Shashanka to such an important position. Middleton (2015) argues in a similar vein that Shashanka served as maha samanta to a Gauda king, possibly Jayanaga.

Whether Shashanka was a feudatory under the Maukharis or the Guptas is not known. By 605 C.E. following Mahasenagupta's death, Shashanka had established what became known as the Gauda Kingdom. From there, he issued gold coins to celebrate his triumph, and came to be addressed as Maharajadhiraja (king of great kings).

== Military campaigns and warfare ==
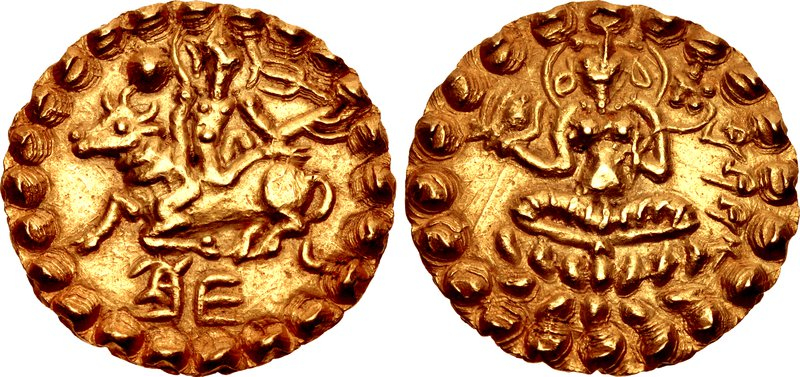
Coinage of Sasanka Deva. Samatata type. Assam mint.

Not many historical references to the Gauda Army are available. Like its predecessor, the Late Gupta army, Shashanka's army had infantry and cavalry units. D. C. Sircar (1990) reports that the Gauda army also fielded a strong elephant corps in Kamarupa.

Kamarupa king Bhaskaravarman describes the Gauda army as fielding a strong naval force.

=== Campaign against the Varmans of Kamarupa (Assam) ===
It appears that between 595 and 600 C.E. the Gauda army had carried out attacks against the Varman King Susthitavarman of Kamarupa (Assam). The Varman king died early in the war, and his two sons stepped up. The Doobi Copper Plate inscriptions tell us that the Gauda army fought and defeated the king, and princes Bhaskaravarma of Kamrupa and Supratisthita. The princes are described as fighting a mighty elephantry force.

The princes were brought back to Gauda as prisoners but released shortly thereafter. They supposedly returned to their kingdom as feudatories under Shashanka. After the death of Shasanka the capital city Karnasuvarna passed in to the hands of Bhaskaravarman. However Hiuen Tsang who visited Bengal possibly in 638 AD, didn't mention the name of Karnasuvarna's ruler in his description.

=== Campaign against the Maukharis of Kanyakubja (Kanauj) ===
Hans Bakker argues that the army that set out to attack the Maukharis in Kanyakubja was more of a "confederation of all those who held a grudge", and that it was led by Shashanka.

Now because the ruling dynasties of Kanyakubja and Sthaniswara were related by matrimony, Thanesar king Rajyavardhana immediately set out with 10,000 cavalrymen to recapture Kanyakubja and avenge his sister Rajyashri. Rajyavardhana fought and killed Devagupta on the way. As he continued towards Kanyakubja, he came across Shashanka's army. c. 606 C.E. Rajyavardhana was killed by Shashanka. No conclusive evidence exists but it is possible that Shashanka, who joined the battle as an ally of Devagupta, murdered him. The only source available in this matter is the Harshacharita by Bāṇabhaṭṭa, who was a childhood friend and constant companion of Harsha; neither of these men were present at the death.

=== War with Harsha of Sthanisvara (Thanesar) ===
Harsha succeeded his brother as ruler of Thanesar in 606 C.E. and he once again gathered the army and attacked Kannauj. Shashanka and his allies fought a major war with the then emperor of Thanesar, Harsha, and his allies. It is evident that Shashanka had to retreat from Kannauj. The result of the battle was inconclusive as Shashanka is documented to have retained dominion over his lands. Shashanka continued to rule Gauda with frequent attacks from Harsha, which he is known to have faced bravely.

Siege of Karnasubarna

Siege of Karnasubarna
- Part of Harsha’s invasion of Bengal
Location	Karnasubarna, Bengal
Result	Gauda victory
Territorial changes	Successful siege of Karnasubarna by the Gauda Kingdom; Harsha's general flees to East Bengal

Belligerents
Pushyabhuti Empire	Kingdom of Gauda

Commanders and leaders
Unknown general of Harsha (AWOL)	Shashanka

Casualties and losses
Unknown	Unknown

This is a part of Harsha's Invasion of Bengal, Shashanka marched towards Karnasubarna and sieged it, Harsha's general fled to East Bengal from the battlefield and by this Harshavardhana got a heavy damage from the side of Gauda Kingdom.

== Extent of kingdom ==
Shashanka first established himself in Gauda and set his eyes on Magadha. Magadha at that time was under Maukhari rule, and Shashanka vowed to free it again.

Sen (1977) has shown that none other than Shashanka could have defeated the Maukhari rulers of Magadha. Next, he focused on extending his kingdom to Odissa, parts of Central Provinces, and Bihar.

Though Shashanka remains known, and referred to, as the Lord of Gauda, his kingdom included more than just that region. By the end of his reign, his domain stretched from Vanga to Bhuvanesha while in the east, his kingdom bordered Kamarupa. The Chinese monk Xuanzang travelled from the country of Karnasubarna to a region in Orissa ruled by Shashanka.

== Rule and administration ==
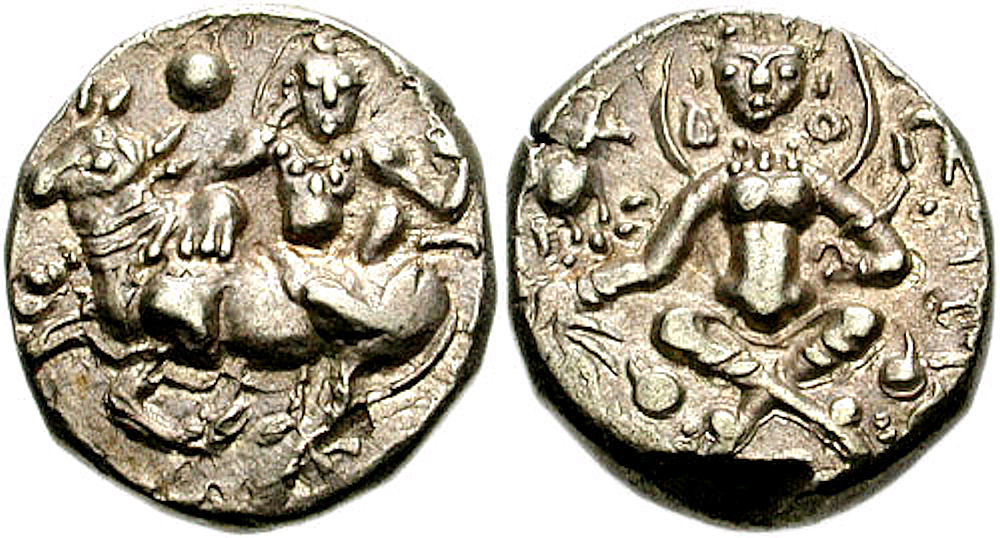
Coin of Śaśānka-deva, king of Gauda, circa 600–630. Shiva seated facing on bull seated left / Lakshmi seated facing on lotus; being watered by small elephants at either side.

Shashanka, at first glance, appears like a "warlike monarch." His endless invasions and conquests tell of a king intent upon growing his kingdom. Sen describes Shashanka as a 'military adventurer', not unlike Yasodharman. But for a pre-medieval Indian king, endless battles, regicide, revenge and intrigue are not uncommon.

Like many pre-medieval Indian kings, Shashanka is said to have grasped the importance of consolidating his position. He formed astute political alliances, notably with the Malva king, Devagupta, to counteract the combined might of the Kanauj-Thaneshwar coalition.

As king, Shashanka continued many Gupta-era traditions, e.g., making land grants to Brahmins, as evidenced by the copperplate inscriptions from the era. Gold and silver coins, known as Dinars, issued by Shashanka have also been discovered. He vigorously propagated Hinduism, and had Sakadvipi Brahmins and Vedic Brahmins invited into his kingdom, presumably from Kanyakubja, among other places.

=== Art and culture ===
Historians argue that the unique Gauda style of composition developed with the development of poetry in the courts of the princes of Bengal. These princes of Bengal are none other than the Lords of Gauda.

To commemorate his coronation, he started the Bengali era called 'Bangabda' in accordance with earlier Hindu tradition of year counting, which has now become a symbol of Bengal and Bengali cultural identity.

=== Copperplate inscriptions ===
Three copperplate inscriptions issued by King Shashanka have been discovered. Two of these were issued in his 8th and 10th regnal years and discovered from Midnapore. The other, known as the Egra Copperplate, was discovered near Kharagpur and bears no date.

== Suppression of Buddhism ==
A 12th-century text states that Shashanka destroyed the Buddhist stupas of Bengal and was an oppressor of Buddhism. Shashanka is reputed to have cut the Bodhi tree beneath which the Buddha is believed to have achieved enlightenment, in the Mahabodhi Temple of Bodh Gaya.

R. C. Majumdar states that this account is doubtful because it was written 500 years after the alleged persecution, and that it is "unsafe to accept the statements recorded in this book as historical". Radhagovinda Basak states that there is no reason to believe that this 12th-century Buddhist author had cherished any ill feeling about 7th-century Shashanka, and he may have had reasons to describe the events as they occurred.

Following his death, Shashanka was succeeded by his son, Manava, who ruled the kingdom for eight months. However, Gauda was soon divided amongst Harsha and Bhaskaravarman of Kamarupa, the latter even managing to conquer Karnasuvarna.

== Legacy ==
Location of the Shahshankas and fragmented South Asian polities circa 600 CE, after the retreat of the Alchon Huns.

Commenting on the symbolism of Gauda, Akshay Kumar Maitreya remarked, “The whole of Gauḍa was once known as Gauḍa Desh. The Bengali language only a few days ago was known as Gauḍiya Bhasha… Even now in many parts of India Bengalis are known as Gauḍiya. So, if one attempts to write our history, one must begin with Gaur.”

Shashanka's expansion, and subsequent defence of neighbour kingdoms of Vanga and Samatata against the Emperor Harsha is considered to be a significant step in exalting his hegemony over Bengal. Many historians and commentators argue that Shashanka was the first monarch to attempt unifying Bengal under one rule. As such he is a symbolic figure in the region's aspirations for diligence and sovereignty. Shashanka's feat in bringing the many tribes and kingdoms under a single flag becomes clear only after his death. Historians also found the development of the Bengali calendar was thorough under Shashanka's reign.

== In folk and popular culture ==
=== Sarasanka Dighi (folk legend) ===
Situated in present-day Midnapore, Sarasanka is a massive dighi (manmade lake) measuring over 140 acres. That is nearly equal to the total area of 80 football fields. Its aesthetics show clear influences of the Hindu Vastu Shastra school of architecture, design and aesthetics.

According to Bengali folk lore and legends, the dighi was excavated at the behest of King Shashanka.

=== Shashanka (popular culture) ===
Published in 1914, Shashanka is a historical novel penned by the famous Indian archaeologist Rakhaldas Bandyopadhyay, who is best known for his discoveries in Mohenjo Daro. He found Shashanka to be a potent symbol of Bengal's glorious past and future political aspirations.

The Bengali movie Karnasubarner Guptodhon (2022) is an adventure thriller and the third film in the Sona Da franchise. The movie is based on the discovery of a riddle by the lead trio which leads to a hidden treasure of King Shashanka. It stars Abir Chatterjee, Arjun Chakrabarty and Ishaa Saha in lead roles.

== See also ==
- List of rulers of Bengal
