= Prabhakaravardhana =

King of Thanesar from 580 to 605

- Parama-bhattaraka; Maharajadhiraja

King of Thanesar
- Reign: c. 580 – c. 605
- Predecessor: Adityavardhana
- Successor: Rajyavardhana
- Spouse: Yasomati
- Issue: Rajyavardhana; Harsha; Rajyashri
- Dynasty: Pushyabhuti dynasty
- Father: Adityavardhana
- Mother: Mahasenagupta

Prabhakaravardhana (also known as Prabhakara Vardhana) was a king of Thanesar in northern India around the time of the decline of the Gupta Empire. According to the historian R. C. Majumdar, he was the first notable king of the Vardhana dynasty but the fourth ruler from the family, who are also referred to as the Pushpabhutis. He had been preceded by his father, Adityavardhana, grandfather Rajyavardhana I and great-grandfather, Naravardhana, but inscriptions suggest that Banabhatta, the seventh-century bard and chronicler of the Vardhanas, may have been wrong to call these earlier rulers kings and that they may instead have been mere feudatory rulers of minor significance.

Prabhakaravardhana's father, Adityavardhana, had formed an alliance with Mahasenagupta of Magadha against the Maukhari dynasty. He was married to Mahasenagupta, who was probably the sister of this Gupta king who bore the same name. Through these arrangements he had much enlarged the family's estates. It is because of this territorial expansion that, while Adityavardhana bore the title of maharaja, his son was able to use the higher rank of maharajadhiraja. In turn, Prabhakaravardhana further extended Vardhana control, using aggressive tactics that resulted in him probably ruling over the Punjab and part of Malwa. Aside from defeating rulers in Gujarat, Gandhara and Sind, he also resisted the invasion of the Hunas, as reported by the 7th century writer Bāṇabhaṭṭa.

The date of death of Prabhakaravardhana is variously stated: according to Majumdar, it was in 604 CE but some sources, such as the military historian Kaushik Roy, say 606 CE, and others state 605. He was married to Yasomati, who became sati.

Prabhakaravardhana and Yasomati had three children. Their eldest son, Rajyavardhana, succeeded to the throne and was in turn succeeded by the younger son, Harsha; their daughter, Rajyashri, married Grahavarman of the Maukhari dynasty that ruled Kannauj. (Note: The marriage of Rajyashri and Grahavarman appears to have been an alliance of the two dynasties against the king of the Malavas. It was a reversal of the earlier enmity between the Vardhanas and Maukharis.)

== See also ==
- Asigarh Fort
