= Yasomati =

- Spouse: Prabhakaravardhana
- Issue: 3

Yasomati (died 604 or 605 or 606 CE) was an ancient Indian queen as the chief wife of King Prabhakaravardhana of Thanesar.

== Name ==
Yasomati is also known as Yasovati, and as Yasomati Devi ("devi" meaning 'goddess'). Since the "s" in the common English spelling of her name is pronounced "sh" (as in "fish"), her name is also spelled Yashomati.

== Biography ==
According to a theory, Yasomati was a daughter of King Yashodharman of Malwa and a sister of King Shiladitya of Malwa.

Yasomati married Prabhakaravardhana (member of the Pushyabhuti dynasty), and she had three children with him:

- King Rajyavardhana
- King Harsha (हर्षवर्धन)
- Rajyashri, Queen consort of Kannauj

Yasomati burnt herself to death. This is sometimes considered sati, although sati is a term usually used for the widows who died by self-immolation, whilst Yasomati killed herself before her husbandʻs death. Poet Bāṇabhaṭṭa mentioned in Harshacharita that Yasomati distributed her jewellery to the other members of the royal court shortly before she killed herself.

Bhandi, a nephew of Yasomati, was a companion of Harsha.
