= Yashomati =

Yashomati or Yasomati is an Indian female given name. Notable people with the name include:

- another name for Yashoda, a character in Hindu mythology
- Yasomati (died c. 605 CE), spouse of King Prabhakaravardhana
- Yashomati Chandrakant Thakur (born 1974), Indian politician
