= Adityavardhana =

King of Thanesar from 555 to 580

- Maharaja

King of Thanesar
- Reign: c. 555 – c. 580
- Predecessor: Rajyavardhana I
- Successor: Prabhakaravardhana
- Issue: Prabhakaravardhana
- Dynasty: Vardhana (Pushyabhuti)
- Father: Rajyavardhana I

Adityavardhana was a king of Thanesar in northern India around the time of the decline of the Gupta Empire. He was the third ruler of the Pushyabhuti dynasty, and father of Prabhakaravardhana. Adityavardhana's father was Rajyavardhana I and his grandfather, Naravardhana, the founder of the Pushyabhuti dynasty of Tanesar.

Adithyavardhana married princess Mahasena Gupta, daughter of Damodara Gupta, king of Magadha, and probably sister of king Mahasena Gupta of Magadha, thus greatly increasing the power of his dynasty.

Adityavardhana is mentioned in the 497-500 "Mandsaur fragmentary inscription of Adityavardhana/Gauri" as the reigning king, who had just conquered the region of Dasapura (Mandsaur). This period is intimately linked to the period of invasion of India by the Alchon Huns.
