= Later Gupta dynasty =

Early medieval dynasty in Magadha and Malwa

- c. 490 CE–c. 750 CE
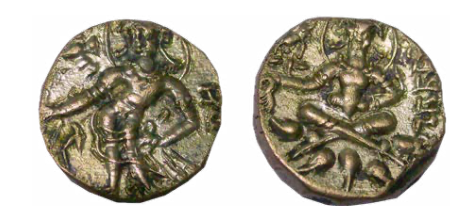
- "Swordsman type" gold coin of Mahāsenagupta from the 6th century CE. On the obverse, the King is shown holding a sword in his left hand. On the reverse, a Goddess is shown seated in a lotus pose.

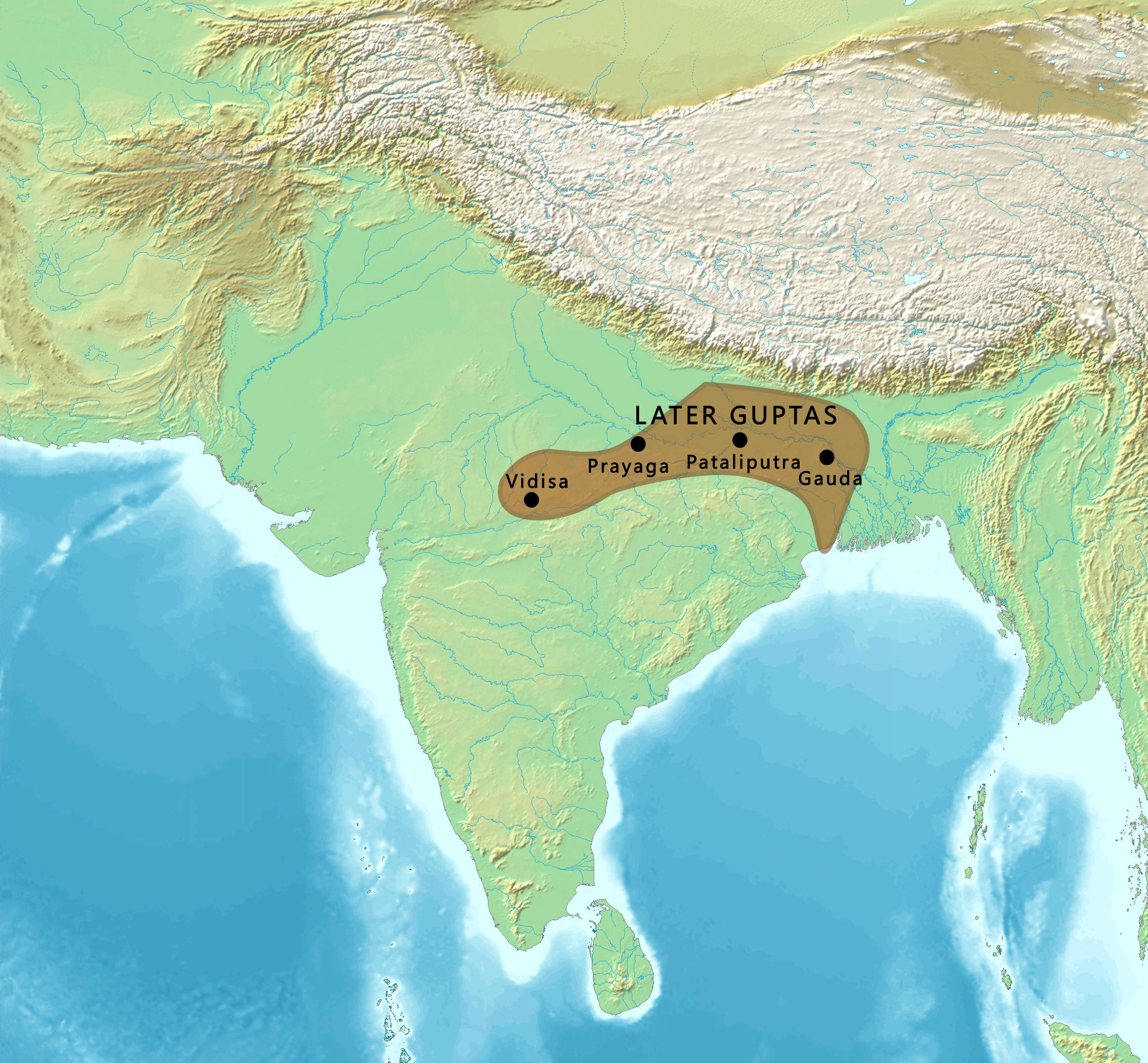
- The later Gupta dynasty at its zenith, and its neighbours.
- Capital: Pataliputra
- Religion: Hinduism; Buddhism
- Government: Monarchy
- History
  - Established: c. 490 CE
  - Disestablished: c. 750 CE
Preceded by
| Gupta Empire |
| Alchon Huns |
| Maukharis of Kannauj |
| Maukharis of Gaya |
Succeeded by
| Varman dynasty (Kannauj) |
| Gauda kingdom |

The Later Gupta dynasty, also known as the Later Guptas of Magadha, were the rulers of Magadha and Malwa from the 6th to 8th centuries CE. The Later Guptas emerged after the disintegration of the Imperial Guptas. However, there is no evidence to connect the two dynasties and the Later Guptas may have adopted the -gupta suffix to link themselves with the Imperial Guptas.

There are several important sources of information regarding the Later Guptas including two epigraphs, the Aphsad inscription of Ādityasena, which sets out the genealogy of the ruling family from Kṛṣṇagupta to Ādityasena, and the Deo Baranark inscription of Jīvitagupta II. The Harshacharita of Bāṇabhaṭṭa is also an important source of information as are the records of the Chinese pilgrims Xuanzang and Yijing which also mentions them. The Gaudavaho of Vākpatirāja refers to the victory of King Yaśovarman of the Varman dynasty against the king of Magadha, with the scholarly consensus being that this is a reference to Jīvitagupta II.

== Origins ==
The general consensus among researchers of the period including John Faithfull Fleet, Bindeshwari Prasad Sinha and Ram Shankar Tripathi, is that the Later Guptas emerged from the Magadha region of what is now Bihar in India. The reasoning behind this is that all inscriptions relating to the dynasty have been found in this region. A Nepalese inscription also refers to King Ādityasena as the "Lord of Magadha". They were likely originally feudatories under the Imperial Guptas and came into possession of large territories in Magadha following the fall of the Empire.

Hans T. Bakker also agrees that the bulk of the evidence points to Magadha as the homeland of the Later Guptas as does D. Devahuti who points out that their frequent clashes with Kamarupa and Gauda show that they were always based out of Magadha which neighbours both of those regions.

== History ==
The Later Gupta and main polities in Central Asia and South Asia c. 576.

After the decline of the Gupta Empire, the Later Guptas succeeded them as the rulers of Magadha after originally being their vassals. Kṛiṣṇagupta was the first known member of the dynasty and probably assisted the Guptas in their battles against the Alchon Huns led by Toramāṇa with his floruit being placed around 490 to 510 CE. Kṛiṣṇagupta's daughter is said to have married Prince Ādityavarman of the Maukhari dynasty. He was succeeded by his son, Harṣagupta, who was placed from 510 to 525 CE. Inscriptions have described him as "always displaying a glorious triumph" suggesting his participation in battles against Mihirakula, the son and successor of Toramāṇa. Michael Willis suggests that the rāja Bhānugupta, who commemorated his victory (presumably over the Hūṇas) in the Eran pillar from Gupta Year 191 (510–511 CE), was a member of the Later Gupta Dynasty.

Jīvitagupta I succeeded Harṣagupta in 525 CE and carried out military expeditions in the Himalayan region and southwestern Bengal. The inscriptions left by his descendants describe him as being "dreaded by the haughty foes living on the seaside shores and the Himalayas". These campaigns in Bengal were likely aimed at the Varman dynasty of Kamarupa and the Kingdom of Gauda. Jīvitagupta I was likely the first king of the Later Gupta dynasty to claim independent status. He also brought the Maukharis of Gaya under his authority.

During the reign of Jīvitagupta's son, Kumāragupta, from 550 CE, the dynasty developed a rivalry with the Maukharis of Kannauj for control of the Ganges valley after originally having cordial relations and marriage alliances. Kumāragupta defeated the Maukhari king Īśānavarman in 554 CE, and extended his territory to Prayaga with Īśānavarman being forced to commit ritual suicide as a result of his loss. His son Dāmodaragupta, who came to the throne probably around 560 CE, suffered reverses against the Maukharis and was pushed back into Magadha, with some historians claiming that he died on the battlefield.

Dāmodaragupta's son, Mahāsenagupta, allied with the Pushyabhuti dynasty in response to the continued threats from the Maukharis in the West and the Varmans in the East. He also extended the domain of the Later Gupta dynasty into Malwa, which had a power vacuum after the death of Yaśodharman. His sister married the ruler Ādityavardhana. He invaded Kamarupa and defeated Susthita-varman. But he subsequently faced three invaders: the Maukhari king Śarvavarman, the Kamarupa king Supratiṣṭhita-varman, and the Tibetan king Songtsen. His vassal Śaśāṇka also abandoned him (and later established the independent Gauda Kingdom). The Maukhari king Śarvavarman is thought to have defeated Dāmodaragupta, invading Magadha circa 575 CE, which made him ruler of the entire Uttar Pradesh region. Under these circumstances, Mahāsenagupta was forced to flee Magadha, and take shelter in Malwa. Subsequently, the Pushyabhuti emperor Harṣa (ruled c. 606 – c. 647 CE) restored the Later Gupta rule in Magadha, and they ruled as Harṣa's vassals. Mahāsenagupta's son, Mādhavagupta, redeclared the independence of the Later Guptas after Harṣa's death.

Mādhavagupta was succeeded by his son Ādityasena who became the sovereign ruler of a large kingdom extending from the Himalayan foothills in the north to the Chhota Nagpur in the south; and from Gomati River in the west to the Bay of Bengal in the east. Ādityasena's reign marked the end of the influence of the Tibetan Empire in North Bihar, allowing him to incorporate the region into his domain. He was also the first Later Gupta ruler to use imperial titles and in his Mandar Hill inscription, he is referred to with the title of Paramabhaṭṭāraka Mahārājādhirāja translating to "Supreme Lord, King of Kings".

Ādityasena's son, Devagupta II, (Note: Not to be confused with Devagupta I (reign c. 601-605 CE)) came to the throne around 680 CE. He held the same imperial titles as his father, indicating that there was no reduction in the size of the territory ruled by the Later Guptas during his reign. He did however, have an encounter with the Chalukyas on or around 696 CE which ended in defeat. The Chinese monk, Yijing also visited the region during his reign and referred to him as the "King of Eastern India". Devagupta's son was Viṣṇugupta who came to the throne around 700 CE and it seems during his rule that the territory of the kingdom saw a substantial reduction. An inscription of his has been found in Buxar.

Jīvitagupta II, the last known ruler of the dynasty, still ruled Magadha, parts of Bengal and possibly up to Varanasi into the beginning of the 8th century. He appears to have been defeated by Yaśovarman of the Varman dynasty of Kannauj circa 750 CE. The details of his defeat were recorded in the 8th century poem, the Gaudavaho. The end of the Later Guptas marked the end of the Magadha region as a centre of Indian political power and the end of a period known as Pax Magadhica. Epigraphic records do however indicate that a ruler known Rāmagupta established his rule over Tirhut after Jīvitagupta II's death, indicating the continuation of the Later Gupta line however they were "insignificant" in relation to the other powers of the time.

== Archaeology ==
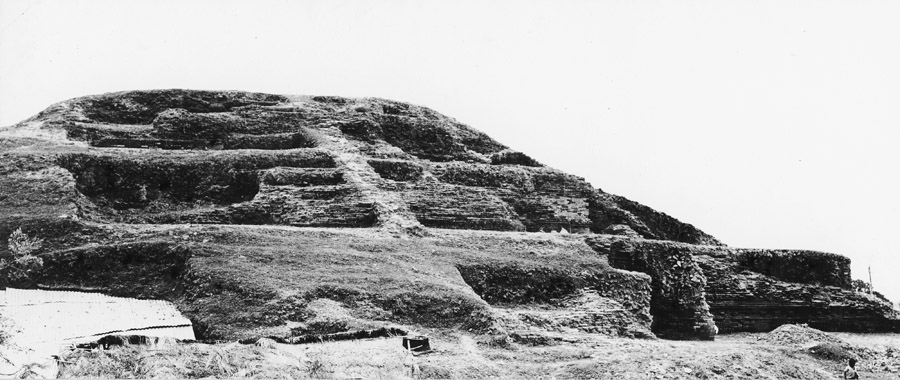
Remains of a Vishnu temple built by King Ādityasena of the Later Gupta dynasty in Aphsad, Nawada district

The remains of a 7th-century temple dedicated to Vishnu were found by the ASI in the area of Apshad in modern-day Nawada district of Bihar during excavations between 1973 and 1983. The building of the temple has been connected to King Ādityasena of the Later Gupta dynasty on the basis of an inscription in nearby Mandar Parvat which attributes the building of a Vishnu temple from the same period to Ādityasena. The temple measured 15 metres in height, composed of five stories and was described as being a "rectangular pyramidal brick structure". Within the temple are stucco reliefs depicting scenes from the Ramayana. Sculptures including a well-preserved Vishnu have also been found in and around the site of Apshad from the Later Gupta period. Many of the shrines within the modern village of Aphsad contain statues dating back to the Later Gupta period which are still used for worship amongst the locals to this day.

Later Gupta period sculpture of Vishnu from Apshad

=== Coinage ===
Coinage from the reign of the Later Gupta kings has been relatively scarce. So far the only coins discovered are from the period of Mahāsenagupta who ruled from 562-601 CE. The numismatic evidence makes it clear that the Later Guptas were devout Shaivites with depictions of Nandi replacing the depictions of Garuda that were present in the coinage of the imperial Guptas. Two types of coinage from Mahāsenagupta's reign have been discovered, the "archer type" and the "swordsman type".

== Foreign relations ==
The Later Guptas maintained marital ties with their neighbours. One inscription in Pashupatinath Temple in Kathmandu records the marriage of the granddaughter of Ādityasena to Śivadeva II who belonged to the Licchavis of Nepal.

During the reign of Jīvitagupta I in 539, the Later Guptas received a delegation of Buddhist monks sent by the Liang Emperor Wu who came with the purpose of collecting and translating original copies of Mahayana sutras to take back to China. The delegation was warmly received by Jīvitagupta, who assigned the task of translating the texts to the monk, Paramartha. During the reign of Ādityasena in the latter half of the 7th century, a Chinese Buddhist monk named Hwui Li visited the Later Gupta kingdom. Hwui Li translates Ādityasena's name as "Sun Army" and records that he built a "Chinese temple" (tohina) specifically to house visiting priests from China. It is speculated that Ādityasena himself may have been a Buddhist.

During the time of the Later Guptas, the Tibetan Empire had influence to the north of Magadha in Tirhut until around 703 CE. The threat of the Tibetans may have pushed the Later Guptas to ally with the Maukharis and Licchavis for a time. Once the Tibetans had left Tirhut, it was probably annexed by the Later Guptas during the reign of Jīvitagupta II.

== List of rulers ==
The known Later Gupta rulers include:

- Nrpa Shri Krishnagupta (Kṛṣṇagupta), r. c. 490-505 CE
- Deva Shri Harshagupta (Harṣagupta), r. c. 505-525 CE
- Shri Jivitagupta I (Jīvitagupta), r. c. 525-550 CE
- Shri Kumaragupta I (Kumāragupta), r. c. 550-560 CE
- Shri Damodaragupta (Dāmodaragupta), r. c. 560-562 CE
- Shri Mahasenagupta (Mahāsenagupta), r. c. 562-601 CE
- Shri Kumaragupta II (Kumāragupta), r. c. 601 CE
- Shri Devagupta I, r. c. 601-605 CE (As king of eastern part of the Later Gupta kingdom after defeat of his father)
- Shri Madhavagupta (Mādhavagupta), r. c. 601-655 CE (Queen: Shrimati)
- Maharajadhiraja Ādityasena, r. c. 655-680 CE (Queen: Konadevi)
- Maharajadhiraja Devagupta II, r. c. 680-700 CE (Queen: Kamaladevi)
- Maharajadhiraja Vishnugupta (Viṣṇugupta) (Queen: Ijjadevi)
- Maharajadhiraja Jivitagupta II (Jīvitagupta)

== Possible descendants ==
=== Guptas of Jayapura ===
A small kingdom that ruled the area around Lakhisarai district during the 11th and 12th centuries bore the name Gupta and has subsequently been linked as a surviving line of the Later Guptas. Evidence of their rule comes from the Panchob copper-plate inscription which was discovered in 1919. They were vassals of the Pala Empire. After the decline of the Palas, Rajadityagupta declared independence. His son, Krishnagupta, passed away before him. Rajadityagupta was succeeded by his grandson, Sangramagupta. It is believed that Sarhgramagupta was a contemporary of Lakshmana Sena. The Guptas' power was likely ended by Muhammad Bakhtiyar Khalji in the early 13th century during the reign of Sangramagupta.

== Gallery ==
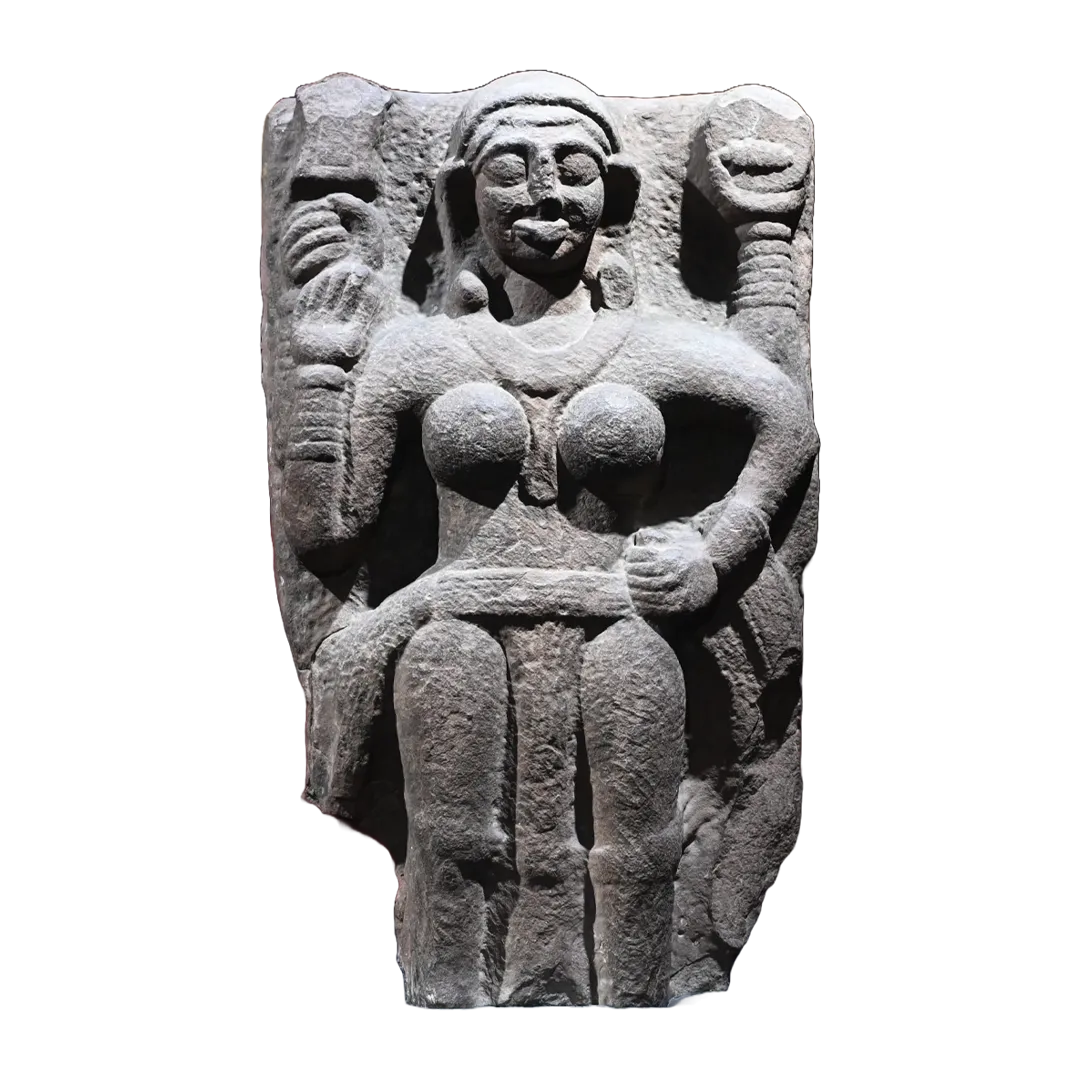
Four Armed Goddess from the Later Gupta period excavated from Mundeshwari Temple and currently kept at the Bihar Museum

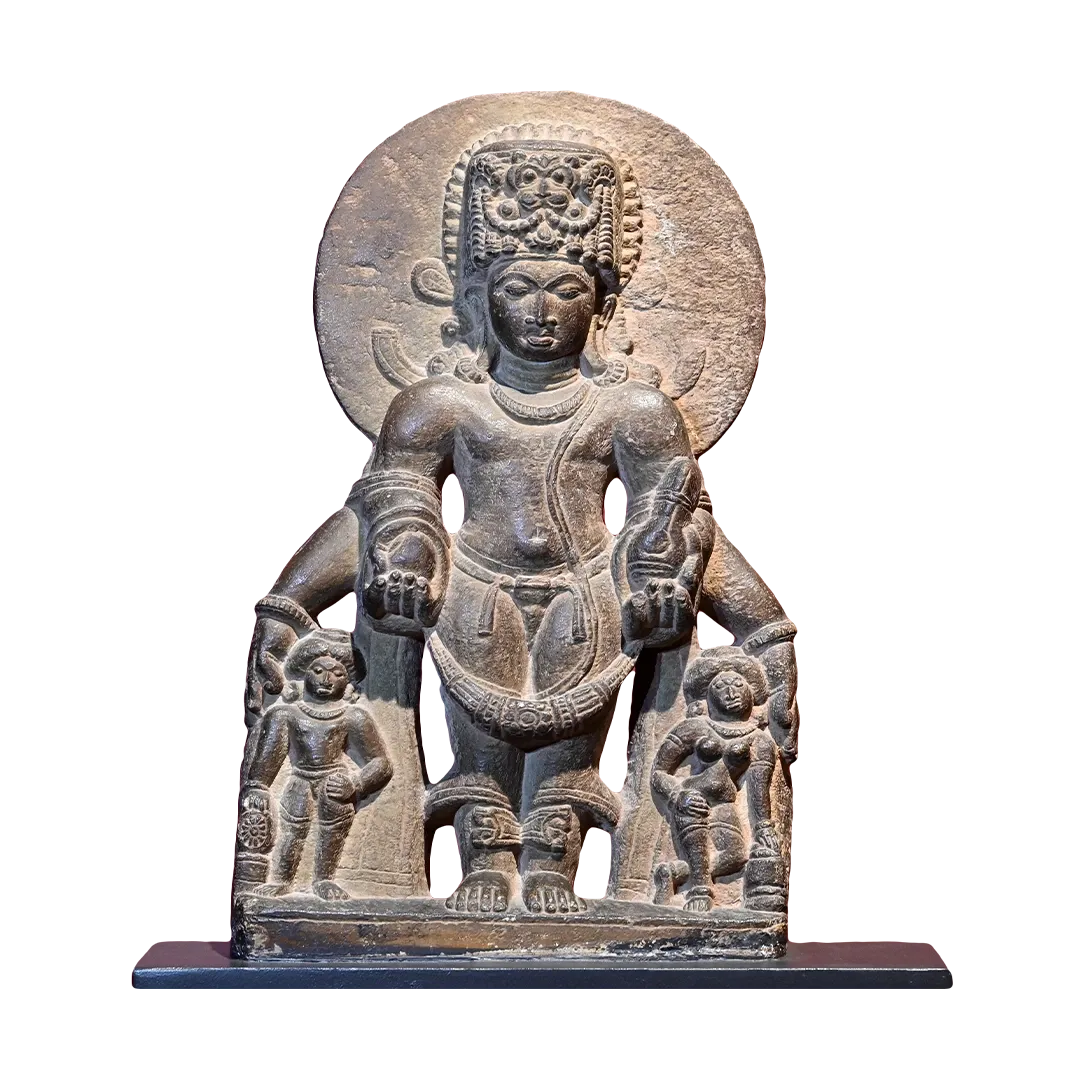
Sculpture of Vishnu from the Later Gupta period found in Benisagar in Singhbhum, Jharkhand

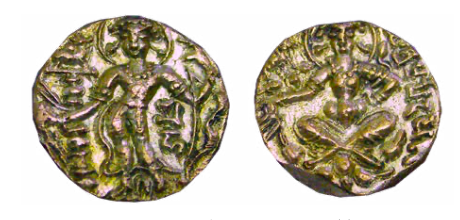
Archer type coinage of King Mahasenagupta

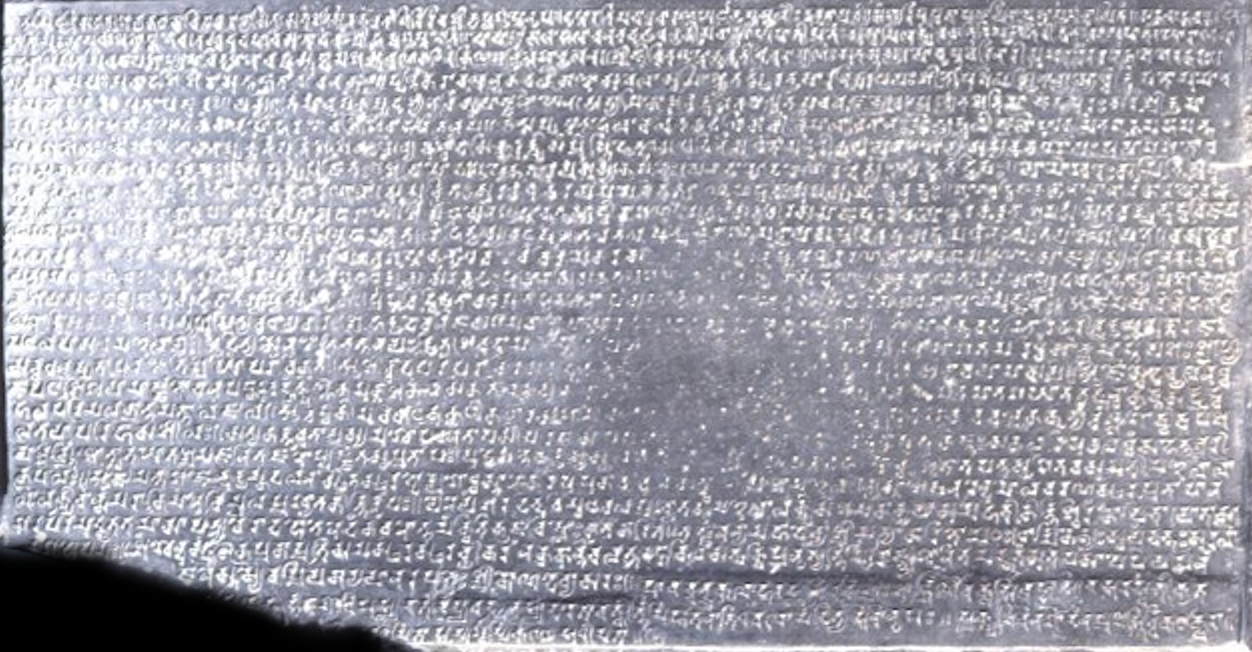
The Aphsad inscription of Ādityasena (r. c. 655-680 CE) establishes the genealogy of the Later Gupta dynasty down to Ādityasena.
