= Jayanaga =

Maharajadhiraja of Gauda from 554 to c. 590

- Maharajadhiraja; Gaudeshwara

Maharajadhiraja of Gauda
- Reign: c. 554 – probably 590 CE
- Predecessor: Probably Later Gupta dynasty
- Successor: Shashanka
- Dynasty: Gauda Rajvansha
- Religion: Hinduism

Jayanaga was the king of the Gauda kingdom in somewhat after 554 CE, said to be the predecessor of the most prominent king of Gauda, Shashanka. Jayanaga made several military campaigns in order to secure the sovereignty of Gauda. Jayanaga was the first important and independent king of Gauda.
