= Manava (king) =

Maharajadhiraja of Gauda (636 CE, 8 months)

Maharajadhiraja of Gauda
- Reign: 636 CE (8 months)
- Predecessor: Shashanka
- Successor: Position abolished
- Dynasty: Gauda Rajvansha
- Father: Shashanka
- Mother: Unknown
- Religion: Hinduism (Shaivism)

Manava was the son and successor to the previous King of Gauda, Shashanka. He was the last recorded ruler of the dynasty and was likely deposed by Harshavardhana (King of Kannauj) or Bhaskaravarman (King of Kamarupa). He ruled as king for 8 months 5 days at 636 CE.

== See also ==
- List of rulers of Bengal
