= Mahasenagupta =

King of Magadha (562–575) and King of Malwa (575–601)

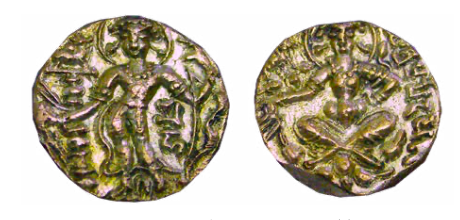
- Archer type coinage of King Mahasenagupta of the Later Gupta dynasty, c. 6th century CE

King of Magadha
- Reign: 562–575
- Predecessor: Damodaragupta
- Successor: Himself as King of Malwa

King of Malwa
- Reign: 575–601
- Predecessor: Himself as Emperor of Magadha
- Successor: Devagupta
- Died: 601
- House: Later Gupta
- Father: Damodaragupta

Mahasenagupta was King of Magadha from 562 until his defeat in 575 and thereafter the King of Malwa until his death in 601. He belonged to the Later Gupta dynasty of Magadha.

Just before his death, Mahasenagupta sent his sons Kumaragupta and Madhavagupta to Thanesar, where they became companions of Rajyavardhana and Harshavardhana. Madhavagupta was made the Kannauj vassal of Magadha after the war. In Malwa, he was succeeded by his son Devagupta, who was defeated by Rajyavardhana of Kannauj in 605.

== Reign ==
In order to counter the hostility of the Kingdom of Kannauj, near the start of his reign he allied himself with the Kingdom of Thanesar by giving his sister's hand in marriage to Adityavardhana. Mahasenagupta went to war with the Kamarupa Kingdom around 575 during a period of anarchy in Bengal, and defeated the king of Kamarupa, Susthitavarman.

However, he soon faced two disastrous invasions following this event. A king of the Deccan, Kirttivarman I of the Chalukya royal family, subdued Anga, Vanga, Kalinga and Magadha. The Tibetan ruler, Namri Songtsen (AD 570–618) successfully campaigned into central India (modern day Bihar and perhaps also Uttar Pradesh). This raid considerably weakened Magadha and the king of Kannauj, Sharvavarman succeeded in conquering a part of the already crumbling empire of Magadha. Mahasenagupta, therefore, fled to Malwa, which he ruled as rump state. Here too he faced adversaries in the form of the Kalachuri king, Shankaragana. The Kalachuris of Mahishmati occupied Vidisa in AD 608-9 and the Kingdom of Valabhi took over Ujjain in AD 616–17.
