= Rajyavardhana =

King of Thanesar from 605 to 606

King of Thanesar
- Reign: c. 605 – c. 606
- Predecessor: Prabhakarvardhana
- Successor: Harsha
- Dynasty: Pushyabhuti dynasty
- Father: Prabhakarvardhana
- Mother: Yasomati

Rajyavardhana, also known as Rajya Vardhan, was the Emperor of Thanesar from 605 to 606, and the eldest son of Prabhakarvardhana and member of the Pushyabhuti dynasty. He ascended the throne after his father's death and was succeeded by his younger brother, Harsha.

Contemporary information regarding the life of Rajyavardhana is limited in scope and utility. He is mentioned by Xuanzang, the Chinese traveller, and in Harshacharita, a seventh-century CE work by the poet and bard Bāṇabhaṭṭa. Neither offer impartial accounts and they differ in substantive details. The military historian Kaushik Roy describes Harshacharita as "historical fiction" but with a factually correct foundation.

Rajyavardhana was the elder of two sons of Prabhakarvardhana and his queen, Yasomati. The couple also had a daughter, Rajyashri, who married Grahavarman, a member of the Maukhari ruling family at Kannauj. Prabhakarvardana was the powerful ruler of the Thanesar region around 585-606, although exact dates are uncertain. The historian Ramesh Chandra Majumdar says he died and was succeeded by Rajyavardhana in 604 but Kaushik Roy gives 606 as the year, and some sources say 605. Prabhakarvardhana had expanded his territory by defeating rulers in Gujarat, Gandhara and Sind, and he had also resisted the invasion of the Huna people. He died while his sons were fighting the Hunas.

The marriage alliance of Grahavarman and Rajyashri had strengthened ties between the families to a point that Shashanka, the ruler of the Gauda kingdom in Bengal, found unacceptable. He retaliated by allying with the Malava kingdom and the forces appear to have launched a successful surprise attack on the Maukhari capital at Kannauj. Grahavarman was killed and Rajyashri captured at this time, which caused Rajyavardhana to retaliate in turn. He commanded a 10,000-strong cavalry force that was successful in defeating the Malava ruler, with the main army of infantry and war elephants supporting it under the charge of his younger brother, Harsha.

Rajyavardhana's success was against an advance guard of his enemy. He died later in 606 as he made his way onwards to press an action at Kannauj itself. He was perhaps murdered by Shashanka, who may have invited him to a meeting with treachery in mind, although the only sources for this claim are Bāṇabhaṭṭa and Xuanzang, who both had reasons to write unfavourably of Shashanka.

Harsha succeeded Rajyavardhana as ruler of Thanesar and vowed to avenge his brother's death.
