= Grahavarman =

Maharajadhiraja of Kannauj from 600 to 605

Maharajadhiraja of Kannauj
- Reign: 600–605
- Predecessor: Avantivarman
- Successor: Harshavardhana
- Spouse: Rajyashri
- Dynasty: Maukhari
- Father: Avantivarman

Grahavarman was the king of Kannauj around the early seventh-century CE. He came from the Maukhari dynasty and succeeded his father, Avantivarman. Grahavarman married Rajyashri, the daughter of the ruler of Thanesar, Prabhakar Vardhana. The marriage appears to have been an alliance of the two dynasties against the king of the Malavas.

The tripartite struggle for power in the region became four-sided when Shashanka, ruler of the Gauda kingdom in Bengal, took an interest. There had been rivalry between the Maukharis and rulers in Bengal for around fifty years, and Shashanka was concerned about the strengthening of the Maukhari position through the marriage alliance. He allied with the Malavas and launched what was probably a surprise attack on the Maukhari capital at Kannauj, which was overwhelmed. He killed Grahavarman and imprisoned Rajyashri.
