= Tatka Village =

Tatka is a village with a population of approximately 1500 in the Thanesar sub-division of Kurukshetra district in Haryana, India. The Tatka village panchayat also looks after Tatki village.

The village has one government middle school. The health facilities are provided by the Haryana Health Department through a Primary Health Center (PHC), and one subcenter. PHC Tatka is situated in the village itself and has been functional for the past 15 years. It has 25 local villages that rely on it. Neighbouring villages to Tatka are Bargut Jattan, Tatki, Kasithal and Khera. Tatka village is not connected to any major roads. It is poorly connected to Kasithal and Bargut Jattan via mud roads.

The people of Tatka village speak the Punjabi language.

90% of the population relies on agriculture for employment.
