= Pushyabhuti dynasty =

Classical Indian dynasty (c.500–647 CE)

Pushyabhuti dynasty (Vardhana dynasty)
- c. 500–c. 647 CE
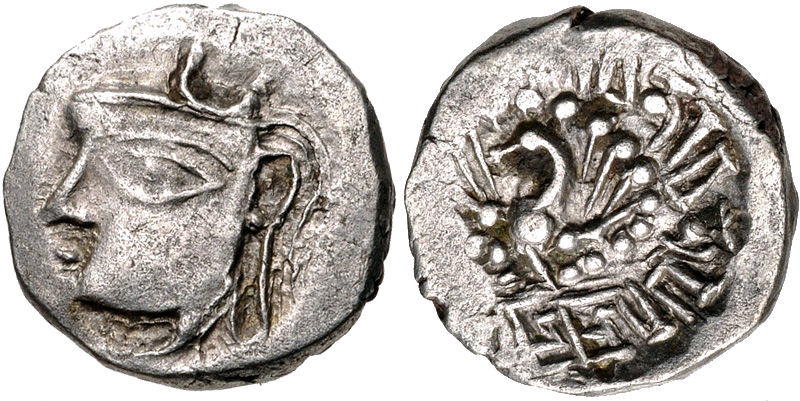
- Coin of Harshavardhana, c. 606–647 CE. Obverse: portrait of Harshavardhana with a crescent over the head. Reverse: Fan-tailed Garuda standing facing.

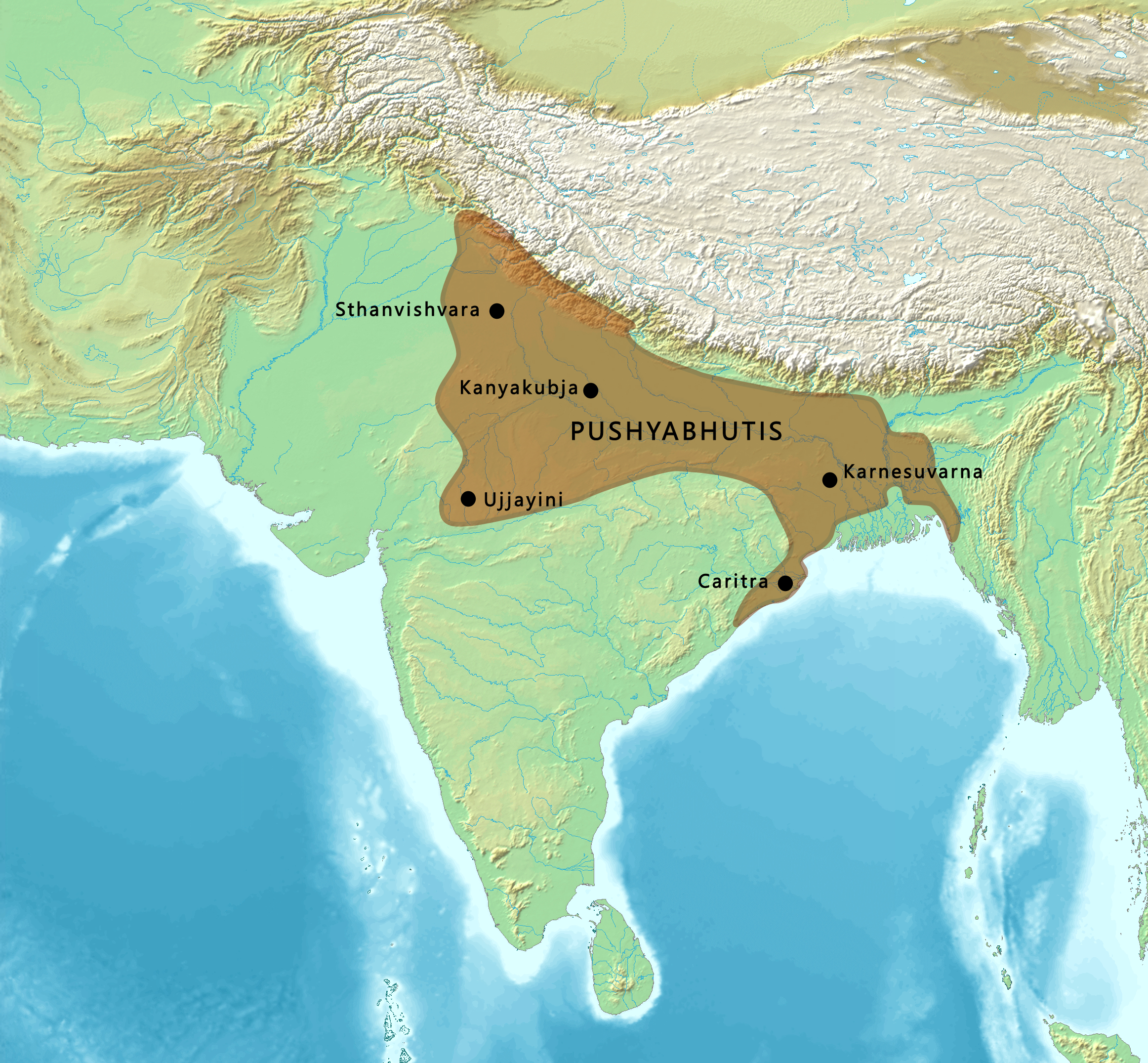
- Map of the Pushyabhutis at their zenith, c. 600-650 CE, and neighbouring polities.
- Capital: Sthanvishvara (modern Thanesar); Kanyakubja (modern Kannauj)
- Government: Monarchy
  - c. 500-525 CE: Pushyabhuti
  - c. 525-545 CE: Nara Vardhana
  - c. 545-565 CE: Rajya Vardhana I
  - c. 565-585 CE: Aditya Vardhana
  - c. 585-605 CE: Prabhakara Vardhana
  - 605-606 CE: Rajya Vardhana II
  - 606-647 CE: Harsha Vardhana
- History
  - Established: c. 500
  - Disestablished: c. 647 CE

Area
- 648 est.: 1,000,000 km^{2} (390,000 sq mi)
Preceded by
| Gupta Empire |
| Alchon Huns |
| Maukharis of Kannauj |
| Later Gupta dynasty |
| Kingdom of Gauda |
Succeeded by
| Later Gupta dynasty |

The Pushyabhuti dynasty (IAST: Puṣyabhūti), also known as the Vardhana dynasty, was the ruling dynasty of the Kingdom of Thanesar in northern India during the 6th and 7th centuries. The dynasty reached its zenith under its last ruler Harsha Vardhana (c. 590 – c. 647 CE), whose empire covered much of north and north-western India, extending till Kamarupa in the east and Narmada River in the south. The dynasty initially ruled from Sthanveshvara (modern-day Thanesar, Haryana), but Harsha eventually made Kanyakubja (modern-day Kannauj, Uttar Pradesh) his capital, from where he ruled until 647 CE.

== Etymology and origins ==
According to Harsha-charita, composed by the court poet Bana, the family was known as Pushyabhuti dynasty (IAST: Puṣyabhūti-vaṃśa), or Pushpabhuti dynasty (IAST: Puṣpabhūti-vaṃśa). The manuscripts of Harsha-charita use the variant "Pushpabhuti", but Georg Bühler proposed that this was a scribal error, and that the correct name was Pushyabhuti. Several modern scholars now use the form "Pushpabhuti", while others prefer the variant "Pushyabhuti".

Harshacharita by the 7th century poet Bana gives a legendary account of their origin, naming Pushyabhuti as the dynasty's founder. According to this legend, Pushyabhuti lived in the Srikantha janapada (modern Kurukshetra district), whose capital was Sthanvishvara (modern Thanesar). A devotee of Shiva, Pushyabhuti became involved in a tantric ritual at a cremation ground, under the influence of Bhairavacharya, a teacher from "the South". At the end of this ritual, a goddess (identified with Lakshmi) anointed him the king and blessed him as the founder of a great dynasty. The Pushyabhuti mentioned in Bana's account appears to be a fictional character, as he is not mentioned in the dynasty's inscriptions or any other source. The writings of Xuanzang and an 8th century Buddhist text, the Arya-manjushri-mula-kalpa suggest that the dynasty belonged to the Vaishya caste.

Some modern books describe the dynasty as "Vardhana", because the names of its kings end with the suffix "-vardhana". However, this may be misleading as the names of kings of other dynasties also end with this suffix.

== Geography ==
The empire under Prabhakaravardhana had its capital at Sthanisvara in the Kurukshetra and according to Bāṇabhaṭṭa Prabhakara was renowned for his military activities against neighbouring states. According to Xuanzang the territory of the Kingdom of Thanesar was 7000 li in circuit or over 2000 miles with the city of Thanesar itself being 20 li in circuit or over 6 miles. The kingdom of Thanesar was also noted have been called the Srikantha Janapada by Bāṇabhaṭṭa.

The zenith of the Vardhana dynasty is disputed by scholars however contemporary sources such as Xuanzang note that Harsha was the 'master of the five indies' and marched from west to east to conquer insubordinate kings during the early years of his reign. R. C. Majumdar places his core territory as containing the regions of Saurashtra, Kannauj and Orrissa with the regions of western Punjab and Kashmir giving nominal suzerainty according to C. V. Vaidya. Recent copperplate finds in Nabha contain land grants given by Harsha to a Brahmin dated to 614-615 CE.

== History ==
The Pushyabhuti dynasty originally ruled a small area around their capital Sthaneshvara (Thanesar). According to Hans T. Bakker, their ruler Aditya-Vardhana (or Aditya-Sena) was probably a vassal to Sharvavarman, the Maukhari king of Kannauj. His successor Prabhakaravardhana may have also been a feudatory to the Maukhari king Avanti-Varman in his early days. Prabhakara's daughter Rajyashri married Avanti-Varman's son Graha-Varman. As a result of this marriage, Prabhakara's political status increased significantly, and he assumed the sovereign title Parama-bhattaraka Maharajadhiraja. ("the one to whom the other kings bow because of his valour and affection").

The Vardhana dynasty was founded by Pushyabhuti c. 500 CE, Bāṇabhaṭṭa recalls him as a legendary figure and implies a conquest between him and the Nagas of Mathura in the land of the Surasena during the early Gupta age. This war led to his victory and the establishment of the Srikantha janapada centred in Thanesar, Bana also narrates that the janapada received its name from the name of the naga king who Pushyabhuti defeated.

All of the kings that succeeded Pushyabhuti until the reign Prabhakaravardhana bore the title of Maharaja and it has been hypothesised that they were feudatories of the Gupta Empire. It has however been noted that Adityavardhana, ruling between c. 565-585 CE, married the sister of Mahasenagupta of the Later Gupta dynasty and partook in an invasion on the banks of Lauhitya River alongside the Gauḍa king. His predecessor Naravardhana was thought to have been a feudatory under Mihirakula of the Alchon Huns, being his contemporary. Ram Shankar Tripathi in his own account states that the regions of Kullu and Kangra were under the control of the Vardhanas during the reign of Aditya and writes that they may have been feudatories under the Maukhari dynasty for assistance against the Alchon Huns.

=== Death of Prabhakara Vardhana ===
Aditya Vardhana was succeeded by Prabhakaravardhana in c. 585 CE and bore the titles of Maharajadhiraj or 'king of kings' and was known by his second name in distant regions as 'Sri Pratapasala'. Bāṇabhaṭṭa recounts him as a strong ruler having defeated and coming into political grievances with neighbouring kingdoms.

A lion to the Huna deer, a burning fever to the king of the Indus land, a troubler of sleep to the king of Gujarat, a billious plague to that scent elephant the lord of Gandhara, a looter to the lawlessness of the Latas an axe to the creeper of Malwa's glory.

— Banabhatta, Harshacharita

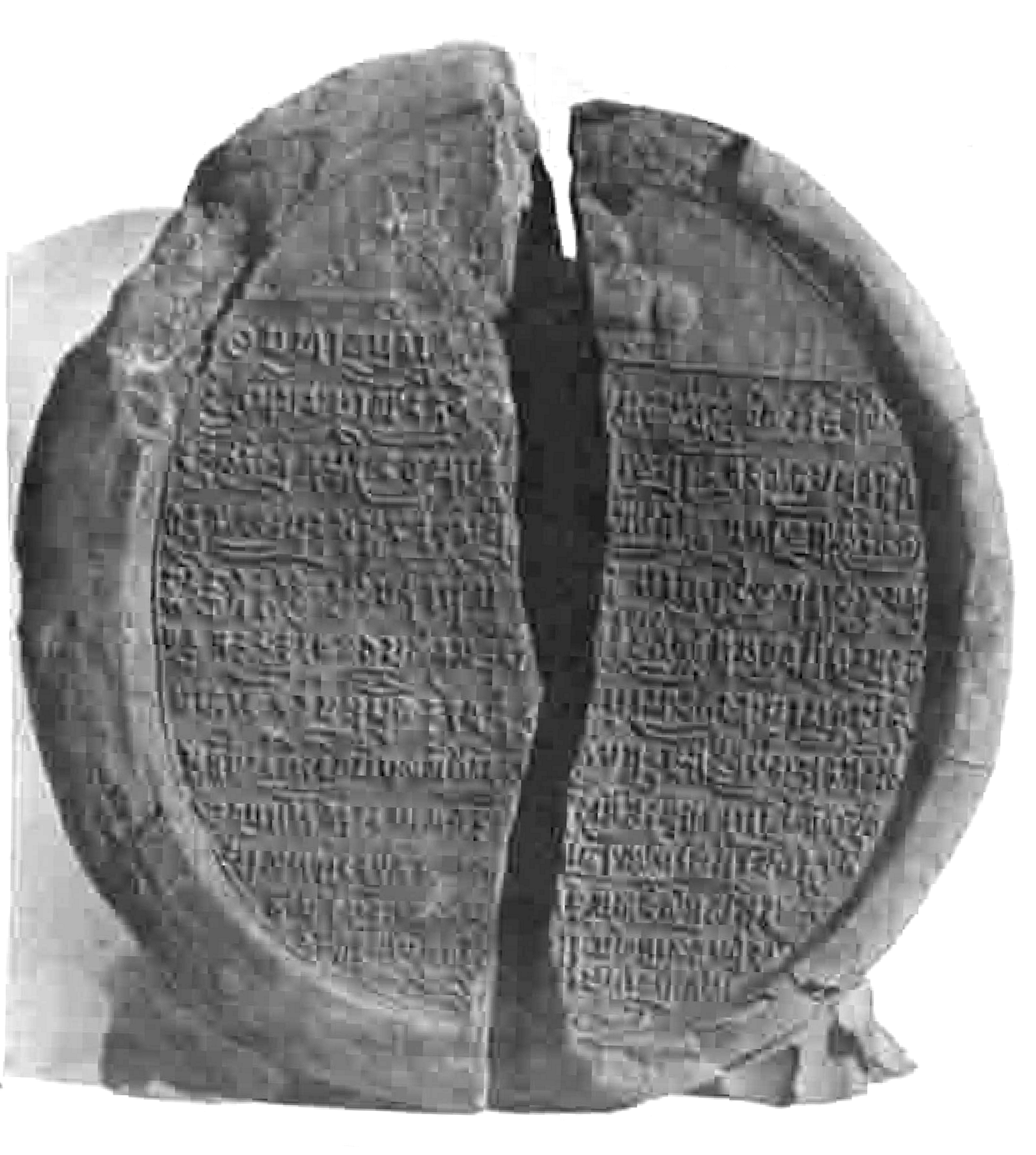
Seal of Harshavardhana found in Nalanda.

According to the Harshacharita, after Prabhakara's death, the king of Malava attacked Kannauj, supported by the ruler of Gauda. The Malava king killed Graha-Varman, and captured Rajyashri. Bana does not mention this king, but historians speculate him to be a ruler of the Later Gupta dynasty. Prabhakara's elder son Rajya-Vardhana defeated the Malava ruler, but was killed by the Gauda king.

The Harshacharita further states that Prabhakara's younger son Harsha-Vardhana then vowed to destroy the Gauda king and their allies. Again, Bana does not mention the name of the Gauda king, but historians identify him with Shashanka-Deva, the ruler of Bengal (Gauda). Harsha formed an alliance with Bhaskar Varman, the king of Kamarupa, and forced Shashanka to retreat. Subsequently, in 606 CE, Harsha was formally crowned as an emperor. He captured a large part of northern India. There are different assessments of the exact extent of Harsha's empire, but he controlled major parts of northern India; his overlordship was accepted by the king of Vallabhi in the west and the Kamarupa king Bhaskaravarman in the east; in the south, his empire extended up to the Narmada River.

Harsha eventually made Kanyakubja (modern Kannauj in Uttar Pradesh) his capital, and ruled till c. 647 CE. He died without an heir, leading to the end of the Pushyabhuti dynasty.

== Culture ==
Bāṇabhaṭṭa vividly describes the kingdom of Thanesar with large amounts of irrigation taking place using revolving water wheels for the production of Paddy, beans and wheat. The inhabitants are described by Bana as practising the traditions of Agnihotra and Yajna, being ancient fire rituals and the practise of Vrishotsarga which was the act of setting a bull free. The roadways are described as being lined with Arjuna trees and the woman wore a Kanchuka (short dress) with a flower wreath on their heads and a mesh over their face. The villages of the kingdom were also elected with 'Mahattaras' or appointed village heads.

Xuanzang states that the majority of the people pursued trade as their source of income with only few being agriculturalists. Rich families vied with each other, collecting rarities from other lands. He also notes that Buddhism was not numerous in the region with the kingdom being dominated by Shaivism, Thanesar had three buddhist monasteries compared to over one hundred Hindu temples. According to Devahuti rice was grown on the lower slopes of the Himalayas whilst sugar cane was cultivated on the eastern parts of the kingdom, milk and fruits were also plentily available.

== Rulers ==
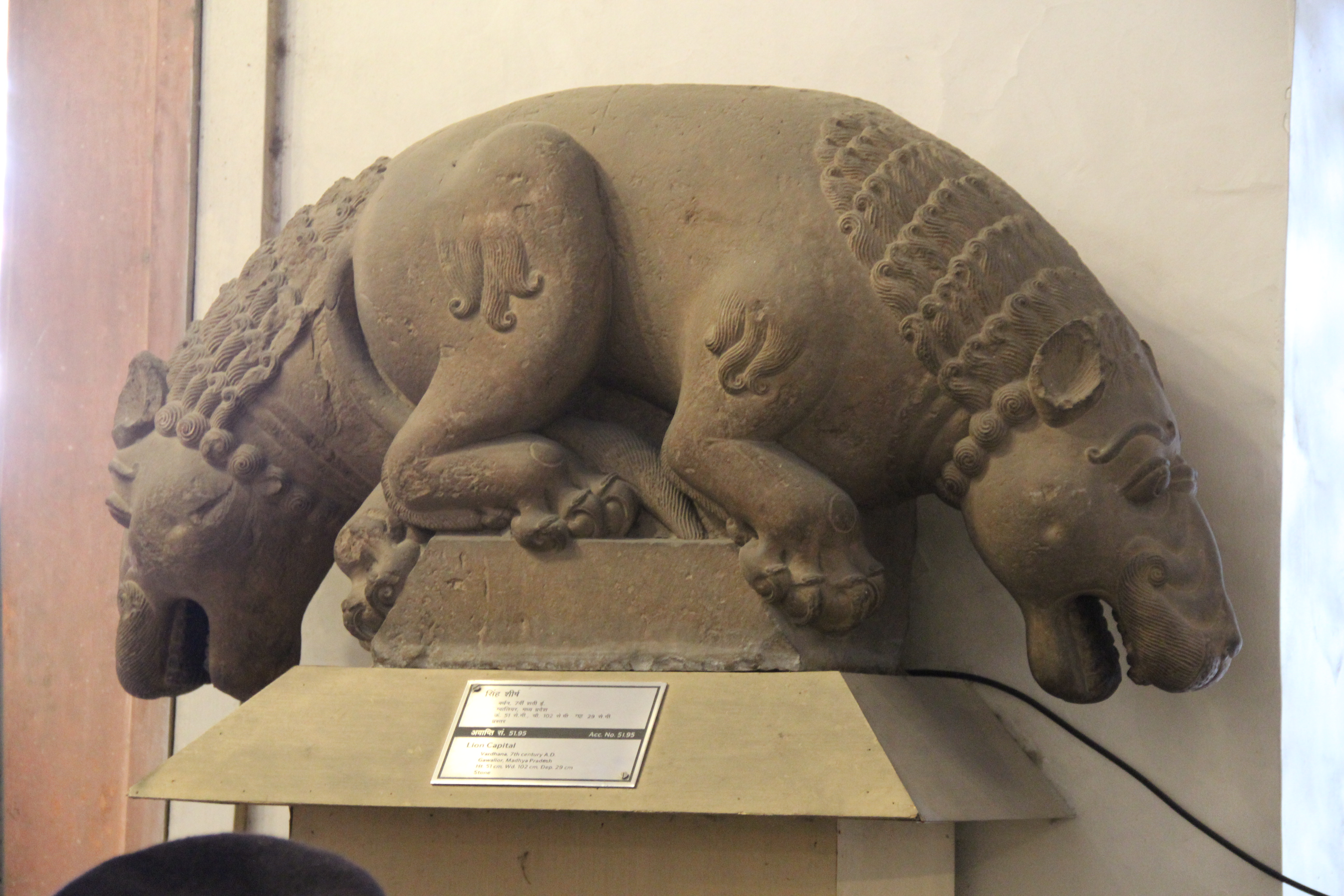
Lion Capital, Vardhana dynasty, Gwalior, 7th century CE.

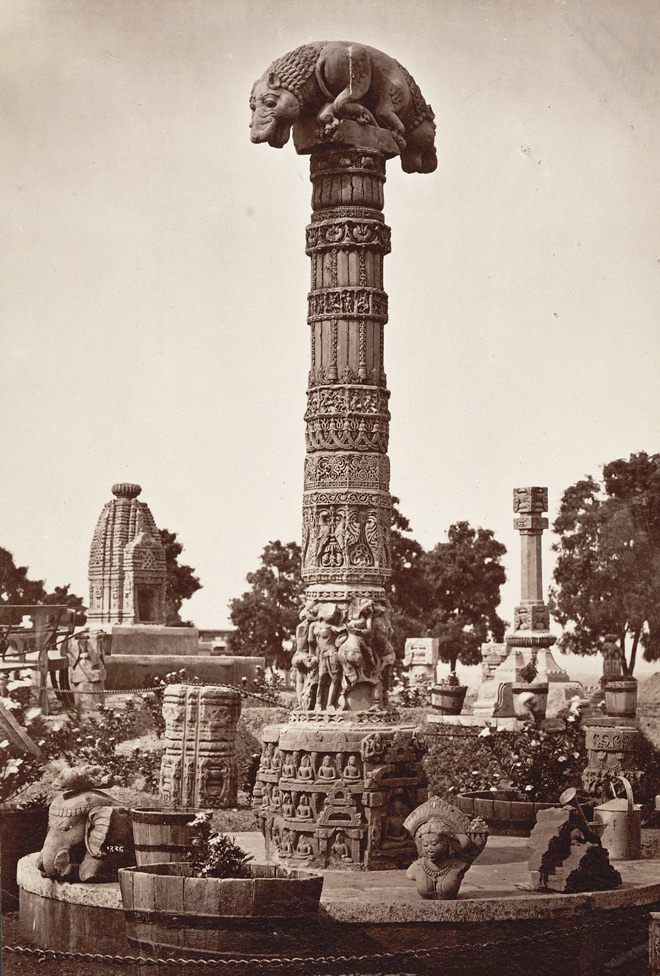
Lion Capital on his original pillar, near Teli ka Mandir, Gwalior Fort.

The following are the known rulers of the Pushyabhuti or Vardhana dynasty, with estimated period of reign (IAST names in bracket):

List of Rulers–

List of Pushyabhuti dynasty rulers
| Ruler | Reign (CE) | Notes |
|---|---|---|
| Pushyabhuti | ~500 | |
| Nāravardhana | 500–525 | |
| Rājyavardhana I | 525–555 | |
| Ādityvardhana | 555–580 | |
| Prabhākaravardhana | 580–605 | |
| Rājyavardhana II | 605–606 | |
| Harṣavardhana | 606–647 | |

== See also ==
- Middle kingdoms of India
- List of Hindu empires and dynasties
