= Harsha =

Emperor of Kannauj from 606 to 647

- Maharajadhiraja; Sakalottarapathanātha; Śilāditya; Paramabhattāraka; Parama-Maheśwara; Gaudeśwara
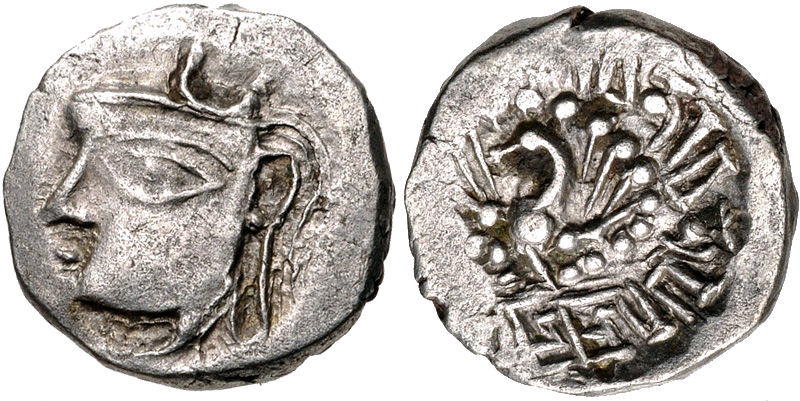
- Coin of Harshavardhana, c. 606–647 CE

Maharajadhiraja of Kannauj
- Reign: April 606 – 647
- Predecessor: Rajyavardhana (as King of Thanesar)
- Successor: Arunāsva (as King of Kannauj)
- Born: 4 June 590 possibly Sthanvishvara, Kingdom of Thanesar (present-day Thanesar, Haryana, India)
- Died: 647 (aged 56–57) possibly Kanyakubja, Empire of Kannauj (present-day Kannauj, Uttar Pradesh, India)
- Dynasty: Pushyabhuti
- Father: Prabhakarvardhana
- Mother: Yasomati
- Religion: Shaivism; Buddhism (according to Xuanzang)
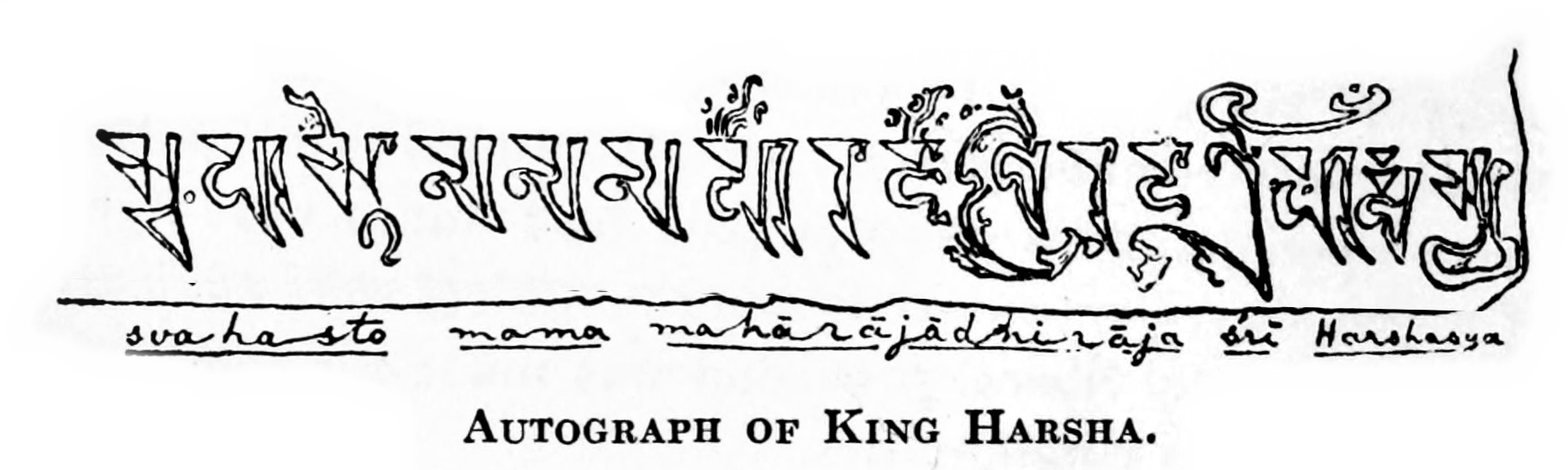
- Signature

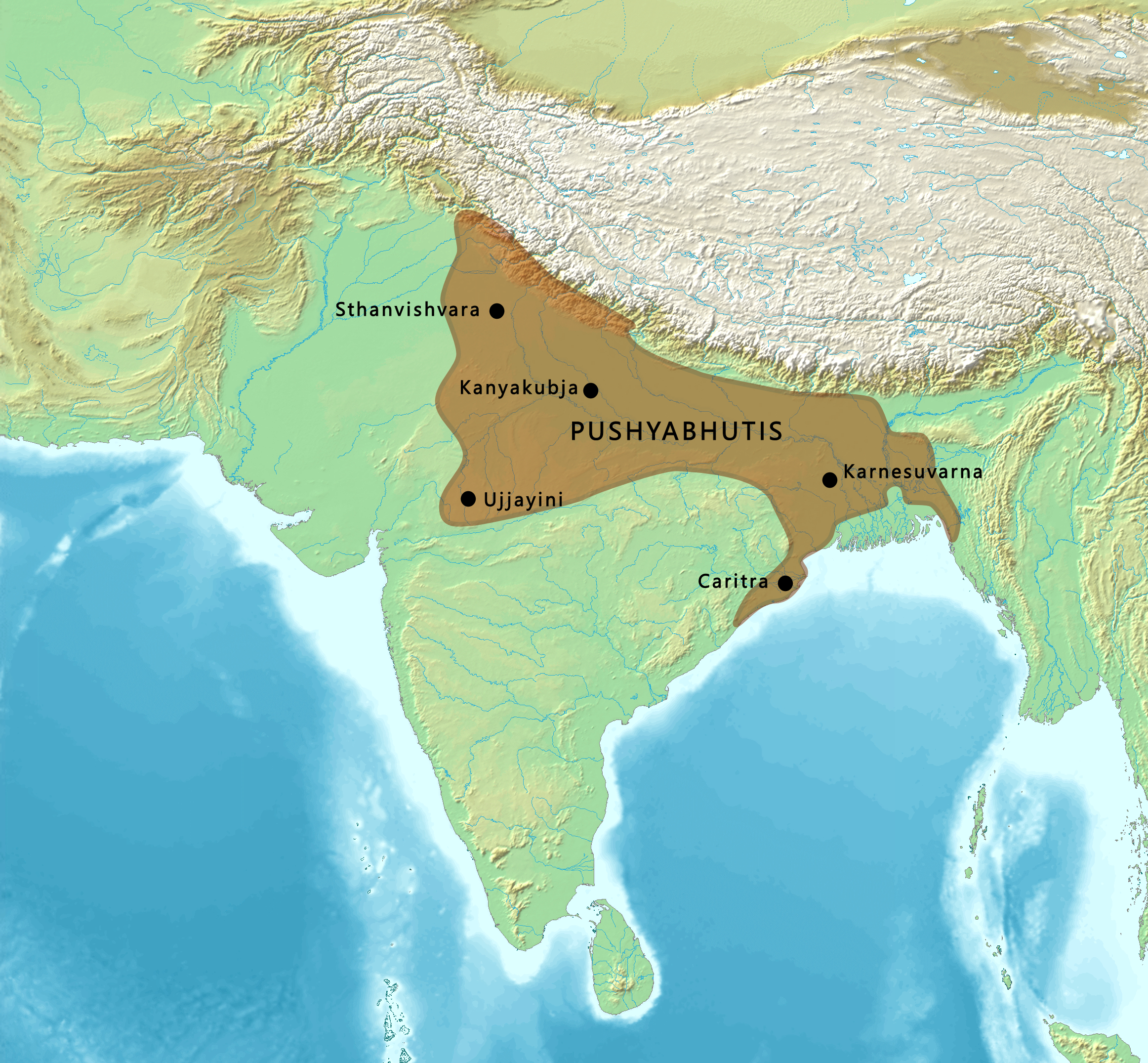
Empire ruled by Harsha, 7th century CE India

Harshavardhana (Sanskrit: हर्षवर्धन; 4 June 590 – 647) was the emperor of Kannauj from April 606 until his death in 647. He was the king of Thanesar who had defeated the Alchon Huns, and the younger brother of Rajyavardhana, son of Prabhakaravardhana and last king of Thanesar. He is regarded as one of the greatest kings of the Kingdom of Kannauj, which under him expanded into a vast realm in northern India.

At the height of Harsha's power, his realm covered much of northern and northwestern India, with the Narmada River as its southern boundary. He eventually made Kanyakubja (present-day Kannauj, Uttar Pradesh state) his imperial capital, and reigned until 647 CE. Harsha was defeated by the Emperor Pulakeshin II of the Chalukya dynasty in the Battle of Narmada, when he tried to expand his empire into the southern peninsula of India.

The peace and prosperity that prevailed made his court a centre of cosmopolitanism, attracting scholars, artists and religious visitors from far and wide. The Chinese traveller Xuanzang visited the imperial court of Harsha and wrote a very favourable account of him (as Shiladitya), praising his justice and generosity. His biography Harshacharita ("The Life of Harsha") written by the Sanskrit poet Banabhatta, describes his association with Sthanesvara, besides mentioning a defensive wall, a moat and the palace with a two-storied Dhavalagriha (white mansion).

== Early years ==
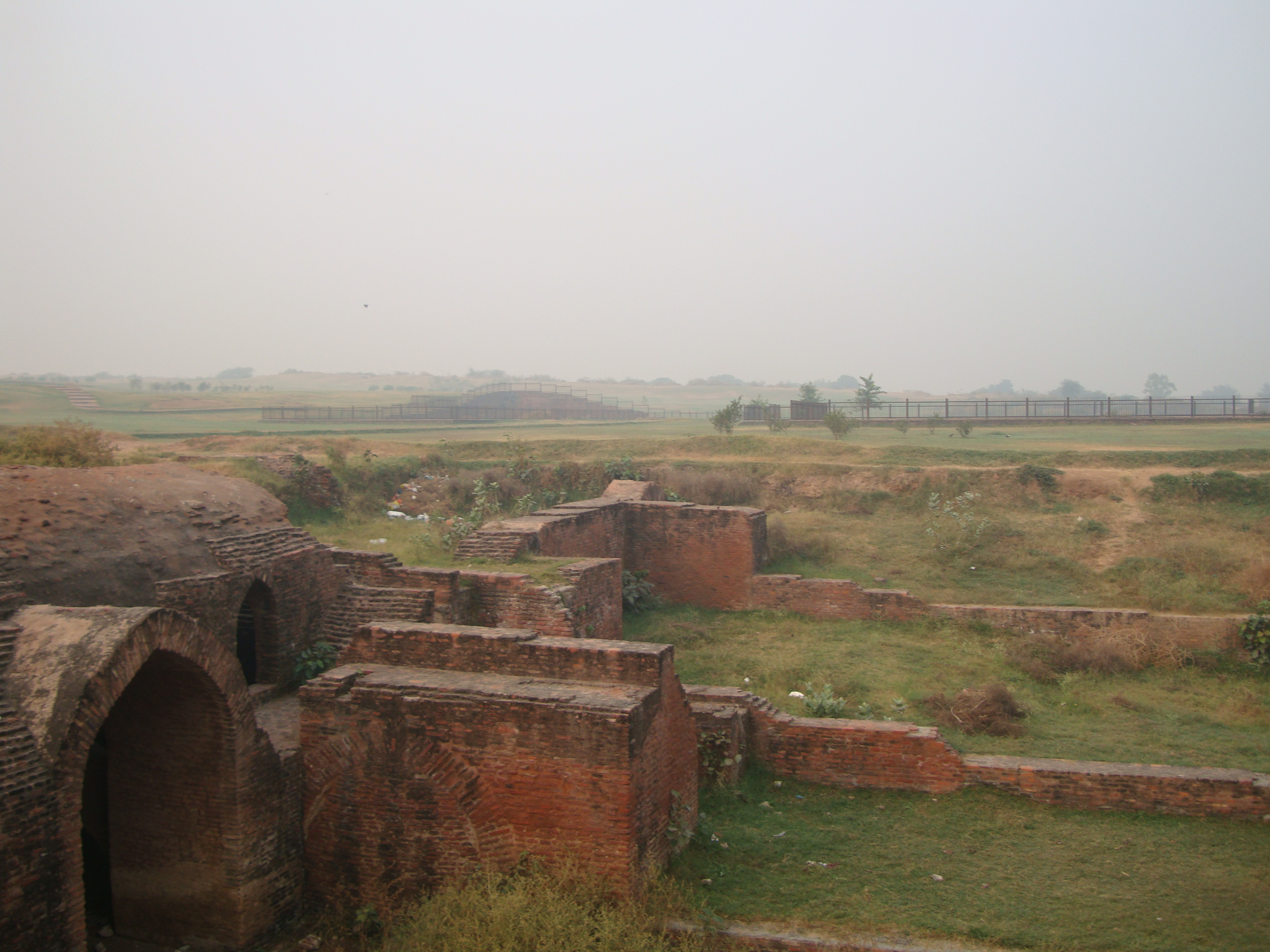
Palace ruins at "Harsh ka tila" mound area spread over 1 km

Much of the information about Harsha's youth comes from the account of Bāṇabhaṭṭa. Harsha was the second son of Prabhakarvardhana, king of Thanesar. After the downfall of the Gupta Empire in the middle of the 6th century, Northern India was split into several independent kingdoms. The northern and western regions of the Indian subcontinent passed into the hands of a dozen or more feudatory states. Prabhakaravardhana, the monarch of Sthanvesvara, who belonged to the Vardhana family, extended his control over neighbouring states. Prabhakaravardhana was the first monarch of the Vardhana dynasty with his capital at Sthanvesvara. After Prabhakaravardhana's died in 605, his eldest son, Rajyavardhana, ascended the throne. Harshavardhana was Rajyavardhana's younger brother. This period of kings from the same line has been referred to as the Vardhana dynasty in many publications.

At the time of Hiuen Tsang's visit, Kanyakubja was the imperial capital of Harshavardhana, the most powerful sovereign in Northern India.

K.P. Jaiswal in Imperial History of India, says that according to a 7–8th century Buddhist text, Mañjuśrī-mūla-kalpa, Harsha was born of King Vishnu (Vardhana) and his family was of Vaishya varna. This is supported by some more writers.

== Ascension ==
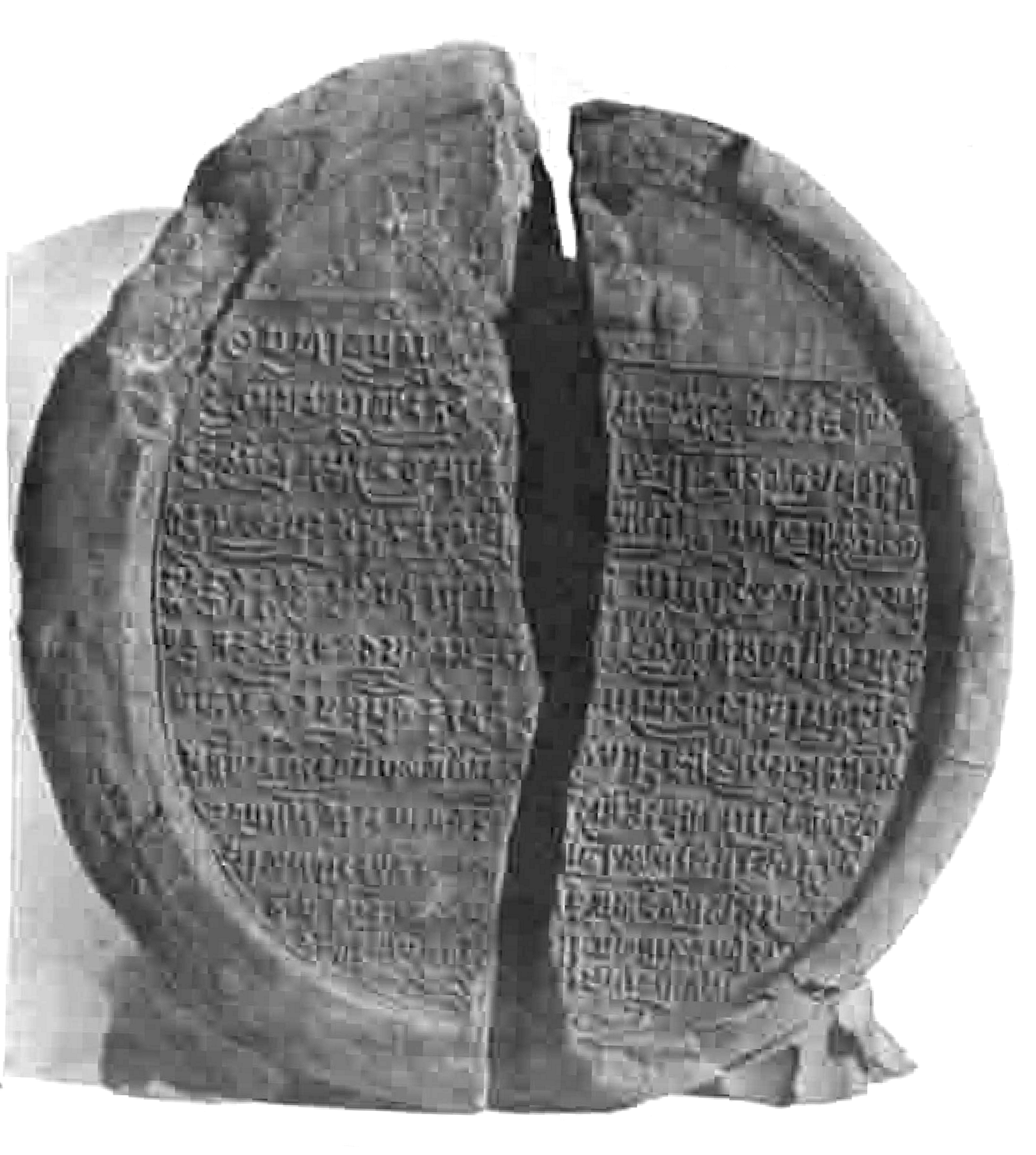
Seal of Harshavardhana found in Nalanda

Harsha's sister Rajyashri had been married to the Maukhari monarch, Grahavarman. This king, some years later, had been defeated and killed by King Devagupta of Malwa and after his death Rajyashri had been captured and imprisoned by the victor. Harsha's brother, Rajyavardhana, then the king at Sthanesvara, could not accept this affront to his sister and his family. So he marched against Devagupta and defeated him. However, Shashanka, the King of Gauda in Eastern Bengal, then entered Magadha as a friend of Rajyavardhana, but was in a secret alliance with the Malwa king. Accordingly, Shashanka treacherously murdered Rajyavardhana. In the meantime, Rajyashri escaped into the forests. On hearing about the murder of his brother, Harsha resolved at once to march against the treacherous King of Gauda, but this campaign remained inconclusive and beyond a point he turned back. Harsha ascended the throne at the age of 16. His first responsibility was to rescue his sister and to avenge the killings of his brother and brother-in-law. He rescued his sister when she was about to immolate herself.

== Reign ==
As Northern India reverted to small republics and small monarchical states ruled by Gupta rulers after the fall of the prior Gupta Empire, Harsha united the small republics from Punjab to central India, and their representatives crowned him emperor at an assembly in April 606 giving him the title of Maharajadhiraja. Harsha established an empire that brought all of northern India under his rule. The peace and prosperity that prevailed made his court a centre of cosmopolitanism, attracting scholars, artists and religious visitors from far and wide. The Chinese traveller Xuanzang visited the imperial court of Harsha, and wrote a favourable account of him, praising his justice and generosity.

Pulakeshin II repelled an invasion led by Harsha on the banks of Narmada in the winter of 618–619. Pulakeshin then entered into a treaty with Harsha, with the Narmada River designated as the border between the Chalukya Empire and that of Harshavardhana.

Xuanzang describes the event thus:

"Shiladityaraja (i.e., Harsha), filled with confidence, marched at the head of his troops to contend with this prince (i.e., Pulakeshin); but he was unable to prevail upon or subjugate him".

In 648, Tang Chinese emperor Tang Taizong sent Wang Xuance to India in response to emperor Harsha having sent an ambassador to China. However once in India, he discovered that Harsha had died and the new king Aluonashun (supposedly Arunāsva) attacked Wang and his 30 mounted subordinates. This led to Wang Xuance escaping to Tibet and then mounting a joint expedition of over 7,000 Nepalese mounted infantry and 1,200 Tibetan infantry and attacking Indian state on June 16 at the Battle of Chabuheluo. The success of this attack won Xuance the prestigious title of the "Grand Master for the Closing Court." He also secured a reported Buddhist relic for China. 2,000 prisoners were taken from Magadha by the Nepali and Tibetan forces under Wang. Tibetan and Chinese writings document describe Wang Xuance's raid on India with Tibetan soldiers. Nepal had been subdued by the Tibetan King Songtsen. The Indian pretender was among the captives. The war happened in 649. Taizong's grave had a statue of the Indian pretender. The pretender's name was recorded in Chinese records as "Na-fu-ti O-lo-na-shuen" (Dinafudi is probably a reference to Tirabhukti).

Xuanzang mentions that Harsha waged wars to bring "the Five Indias under allegiance" in six years. Xuanzang uses the term "Five Indias" (or "Five Indies" in some translations) inconsistently, variously applying it to refer to Harsha's territories in northern India or to the entire subcontinent, grouped around Central India in the four directions. Based on this statement, historians such as R.K. Mookerji and C.V. Vaidya have dated Harsha conquests to 606–612 CE. However, it is now known that Harsha engaged in wars and conquests for several more years. Moreover, whether Xuanzang used the term "Five Indias" to describe Harsha's territory in a narrower or wider sense, his statement is hyperbole it cannot be used to make conclusions about Harsha's actual territory. While Harsha was the most powerful emperor of northern India, he did not rule the entire northern India.

== Religion and religious policy ==
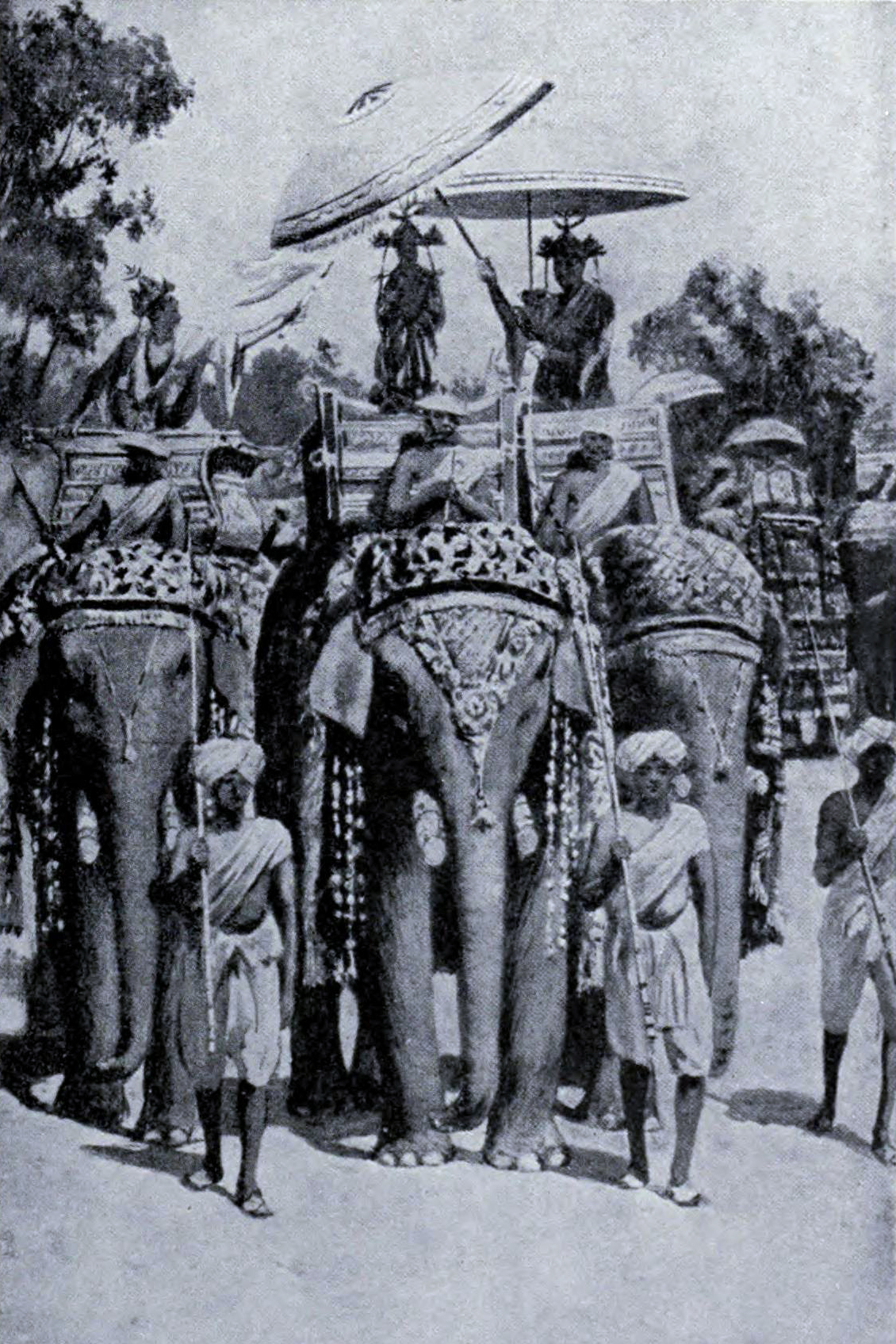
"King Harsha pays homage to Buddha", a 20th-century artist's imagination

Like many other ancient Indian rulers, Harsha was eclectic in his religious views and practices. His seals describe his ancestors as worshippers of the sun god, Surya, his elder brother as a Buddhist, and himself as a Shaivite. His land grant inscriptions describe him as Parama-maheshvara (supreme devotee of Shiva). His court poet Bana also describes him as a Shaivite.

Harsha's play Nāgānanda tells the story of the Bodhisattva Jīmūtavāhavana, and the invocatory verse at the beginning is dedicated to the Buddha, described in the act of vanquishing Māra (so much so that the two verses, together with a third, are also preserved separately in Tibetan translation as the *Mārajit-stotra). Shiva's consort Gauri plays an important role in the play, and raises the hero to life using her divine power.

According to the Chinese Buddhist traveler Xuanzang, Harsha was a devout Buddhist. Xuanzang states that Harsha banned animal slaughter for food, and built monasteries at the places visited by Gautama Buddha. He erected several thousand 100-feet high stupas on the banks of the Ganges river, and built well-maintained hospices for travellers and poor people on highways across India. He organized an annual assembly of global scholars, and bestowed charitable alms on them. Every five years, he held a great assembly called Moksha. Xuanzang also describes a 21-day religious festival organized by Harsha in Kanyakubja; during this festival, Harsha and his subordinate kings performed daily rituals before a life-sized golden statue of the Buddha.

His conversion to Buddhism would have happened, if at all, in the later part of his life. Even Xuanzang states that Harsha patronised scholars of all religions, not just Buddhist monks. According to historians such as S. R. Goyal and S. V. Sohoni, Harsha was personally a Śaiva and his patronage of Buddhists misled Xuanzang to portray him as a Buddhist.

== Literary prowess ==
Harsha is widely believed to be the author of three Sanskrit plays Ratnavali, Nagananda and Priyadarsika. While some believe (e.g., Mammata in Kavyaprakasha) that it was Dhāvaka, one of Harsha's court poets, who wrote the plays as a paid commission, Wendy Doniger is "persuaded, however, that king Harsha really wrote the plays ... himself."

== In popular culture ==
A 1926 Indian silent film, Samrat Shiladitya, about the emperor was directed by Mohan Dayaram Bhavnani.

== See also ==
- Surasena Kingdom
- History of India
