= Thanesar =

Thanesar Sthāṇvīśvara
- City
- Thanesar city or Sthāṇvīśvara city
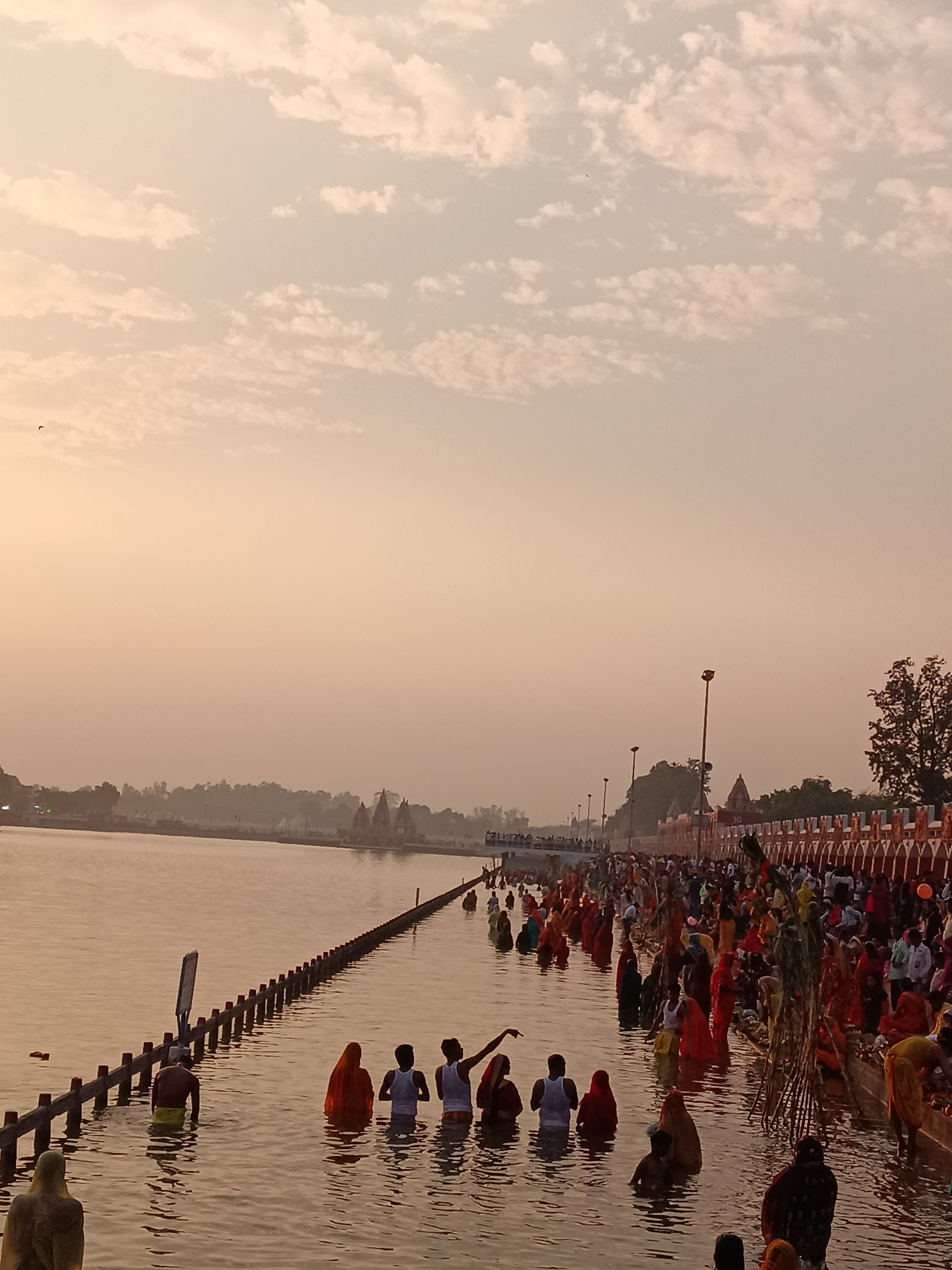
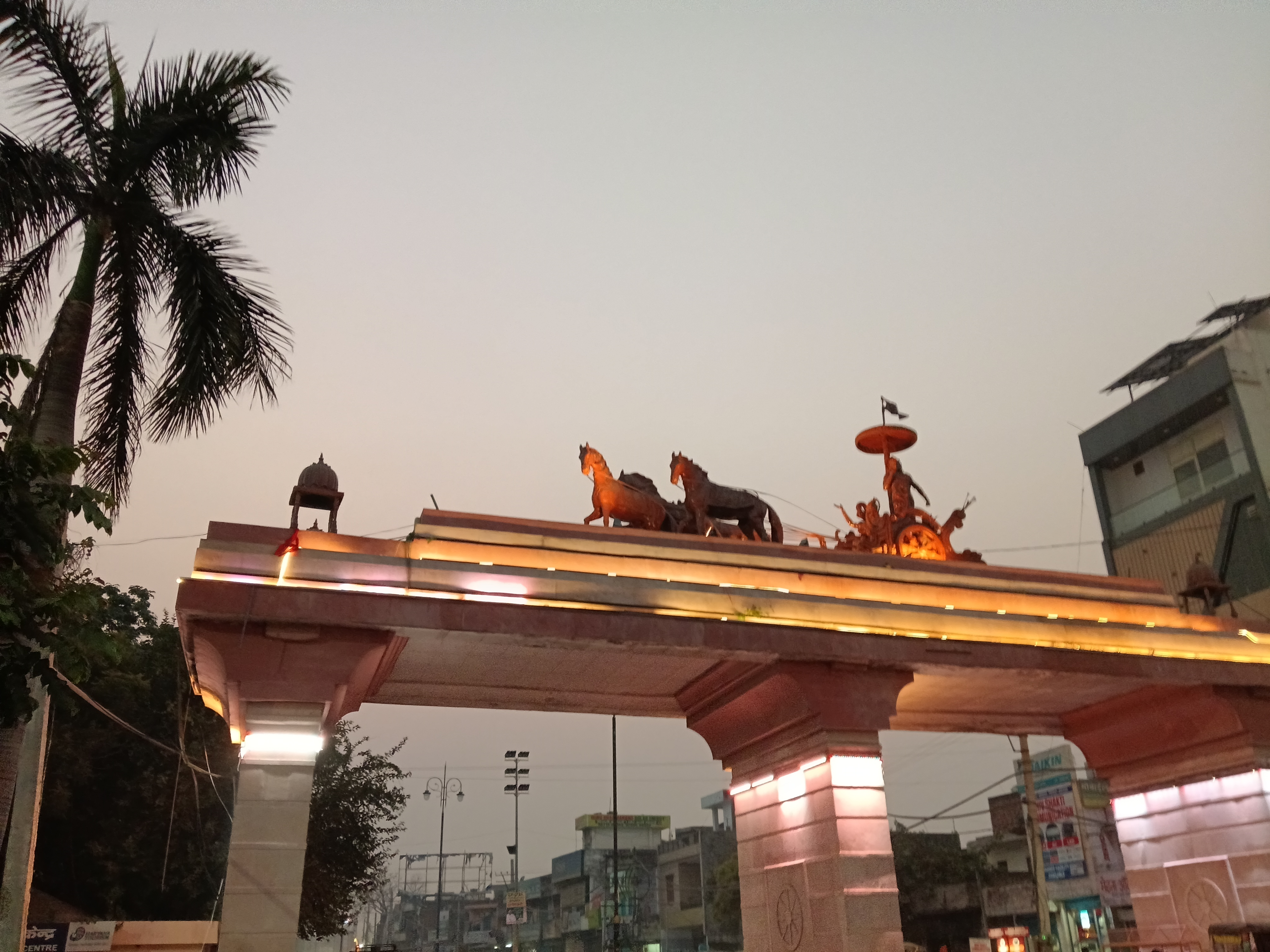
- Brahma Sarovar and Kurukshetra City Entrance Gate At National Highway 44 (India)

- Location in Haryana, India Thanesar (India)
- Coordinates: 29°58′N 76°49′E
- Country: India
- State: Haryana
- District: Kurukshetra district
- Elevation: 232 m (761 ft)

Population (2011)
  - Total: 154,962

Languages
  - Official: Hindi, Haryanvi
- Time zone: UTC+5:30 (IST)
- Vehicle registration: HR
- Website: haryana.gov.in

Thanesar (IAST: Sthāṇvīśvara) is a historic city and Hindu pilgrimage centre in the Kurukshetra district of Haryana, India. It is located approximately 160 km northwest of Delhi. The city Kurukshetra's area merges with Thanesar.

Thanesar was the capital of the Pushyabhuti dynasty, whose rulers conquered most of Aryavarta following the fall of the Gupta Empire. The Pushyabhuti emperor Prabhakarvardhana was a ruler of Thanesar in the early seventh century CE. He was succeeded by his sons, Rajyavardhana and Harsha. Harsha, also known as Harshavardhana, consolidated a vast empire over much of North India by defeating independent kings that fragmented from the Later Guptas.

== Demographics ==
The 2011 census of India noted that Thanesar had a population of 154,962. Males constituted 55% of the population and females 45% (83,655 – 71,307). Thanesar had an average literacy rate of 85.73%, higher than the national average of 74.04: male literacy is 89.89%, and female literacy is 80.85%. In Thanesar, 12% of the population is under 6 years of age.

== Geography ==
Thanesar is located at 29°58′N 76°49′E.

== History ==
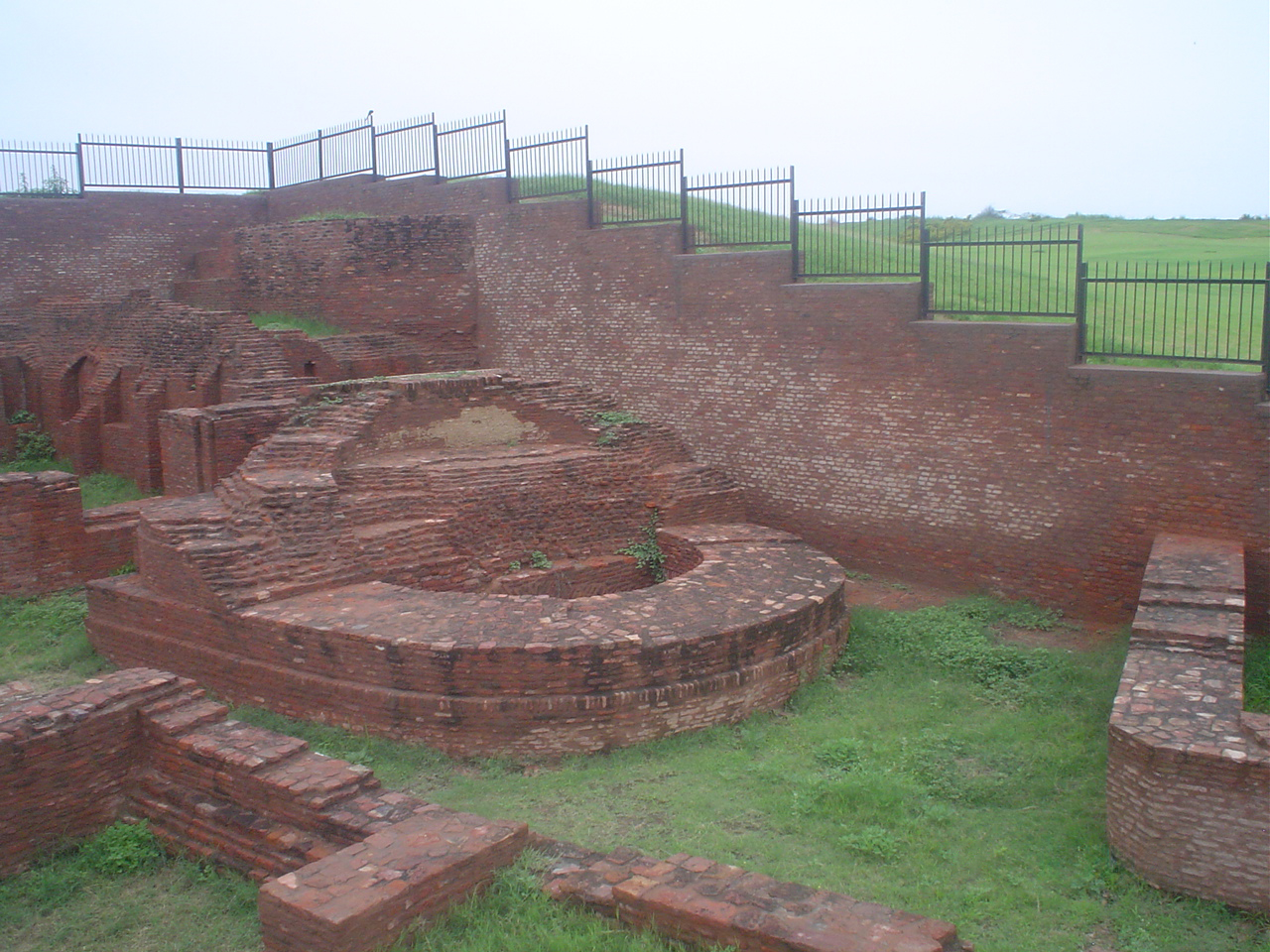
Harsha Ka Tila mound west of Sheikh Chilli's Tomb complex, with ruins from the reign of 7th century ruler Harsha.

Present-day Thanesar is located on an ancient mound. The mound (1km long and 750m wide) is known as Harsh ka Tila (Mound of Harsha). It has ruins of structures built during the reign of Harsha, seventh-century CE. Among the archaeological finds from the mound include Painted Grey Ware shards in the pre-Kushana levels and Red Polished Ware from the post-Gupta period.

In the post-Gupta period, Sthanishvara was the capital of the Vardhana dynasty, which ruled over a major part of North India during the late-sixth and early-seventh centuries. Prabhakarvardhana, fourth king of the Vardhana dynasty, had his capital at Thanesar. After his death in 606 CE, his eldest son Rajyavardhana ascended the throne, who was later murdered by a rival, which led to Harsha ascending to the throne at age 16. In the following years, he conquered much of North India, extended to Kamarupa, and eventually made Kannauj his capital, and ruled until 647 CE. His biography Harshacharita ("Deeds of Harsha") describes his association with Thanesar.

Thanesar is listed in the Ain-i-Akbari as a pargana under the sarkar of Sirhind, producing a revenue of 7,850,803 dams for the imperial treasury and supplying a force of 1500 infantries and 50 cavalries. It had a brick fort at the time.

Majority of architectural remains including Karavan serai, cells, and various arched and vaulted structures date from the Mughal period. Building remains of a large palatial structure from the pre-Islamic era were also found with two distinct phases of construction which exposed brick covered drains and rooms situated around a central courtyard.

=== Sack of Sthaneshwar by Mahmud of Gazni ===
Thanesar was sacked and many of its temples were destroyed by Mahmud of Ghazni in 1011.

'The city of Taneshar is highly venerated by Hindus. The idol of that place is called Cakrasvamin (Chakra Swami), i.e. the owner of the cakra, a weapon that we have already described. It is of bronze and is nearly the size of a man. It is now lying in the hippodrome in Ghazna, together with the Lord of Somnath, which is a representation of the Mahadeva, called Linga."

Firishta records that

In the year A.H. 402 (A.D. 1011) Mehmood Gazini resolved on the conquest of Thanesur, the most sacred Hindu place, in the kingdom of Hindoostan. It had reached the ears of the King that Thanesar was held in the same veneration by idolaters, as Mecca by the faithful; that they had there set up a number of idols, the principal of which they called Jugsoma, pretending that it had existed ever since the creation.

Mahmud, having reached Thanesar before the Hindus, had time to take measures for its defence; the city was plundered, the idols broken, and the idol Jugsoma was sent to Ghazni to be trodden underfoot. According to Haji Mahommed Kandahary, a ruby was found in one of the temples weighing 450 mithqals. It was allowed by everyone who saw it to be a wonder that had never been heard of. About the attack on Thanesar, Utbi wrote "The blood of the infidels flowed so copiously that the stream was discoloured, notwithstanding its purity, and people were unable to drink it."

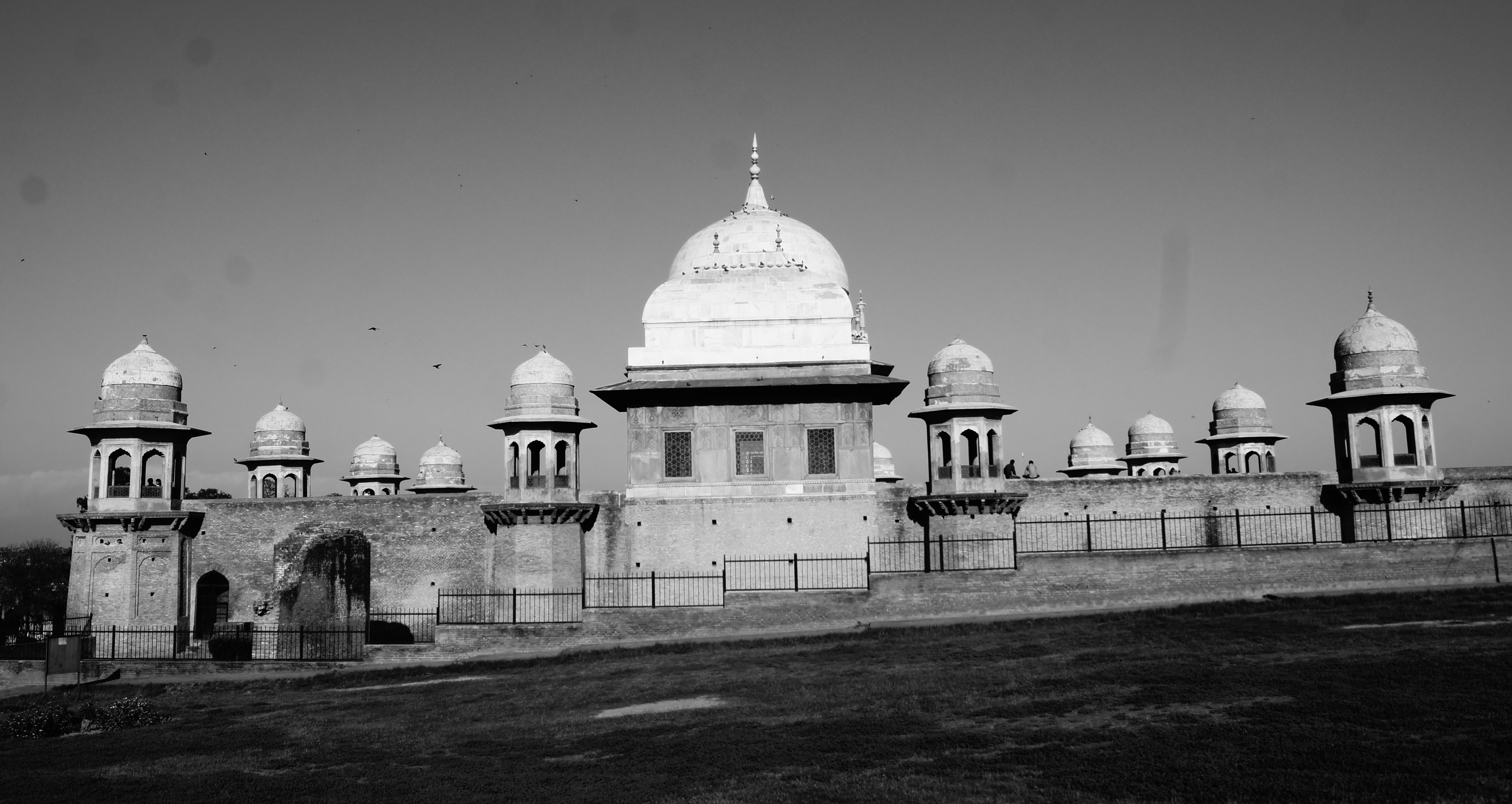
Sheikh Chilli's Tomb

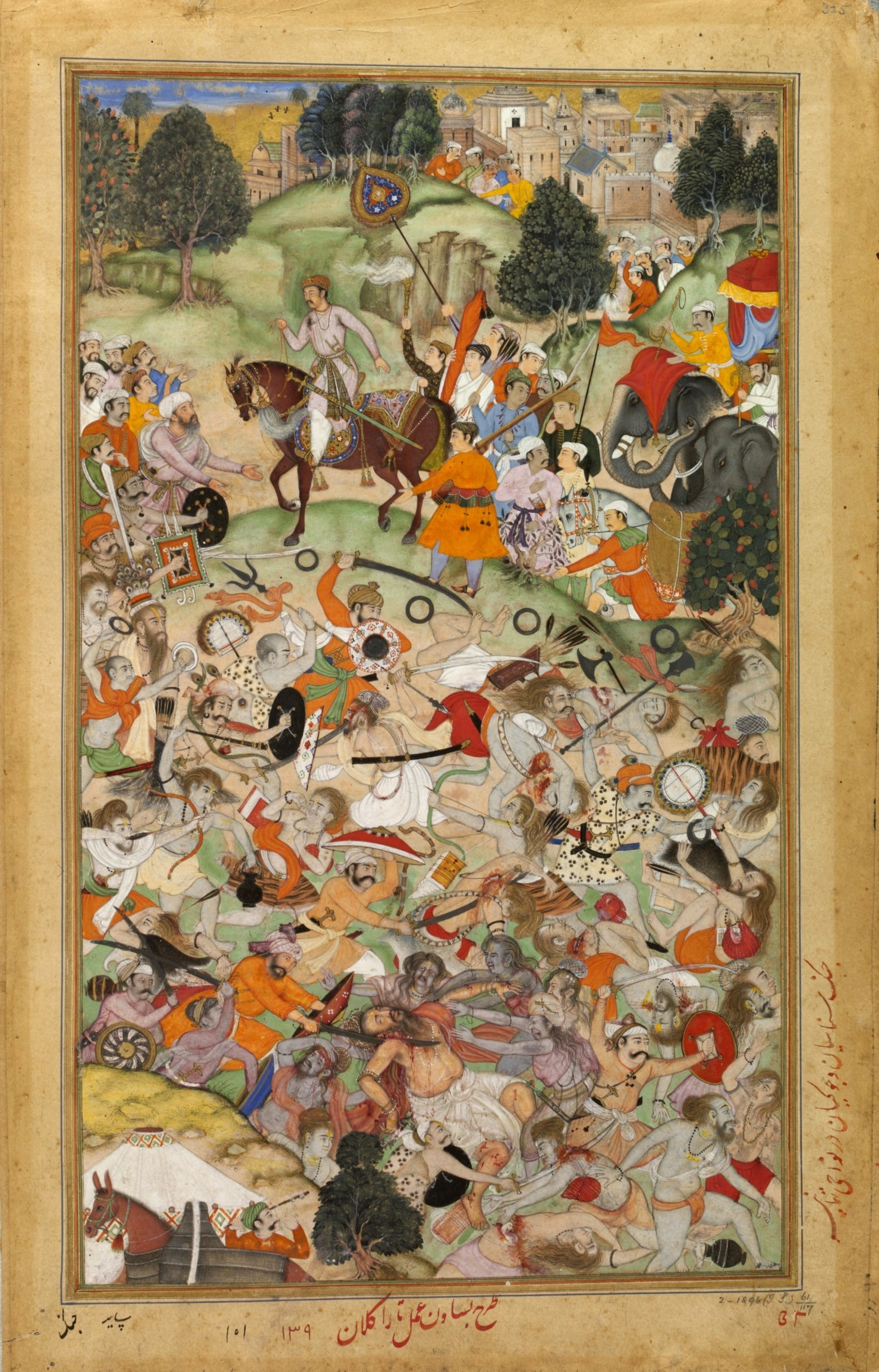
Battle of Thanesar (1567)

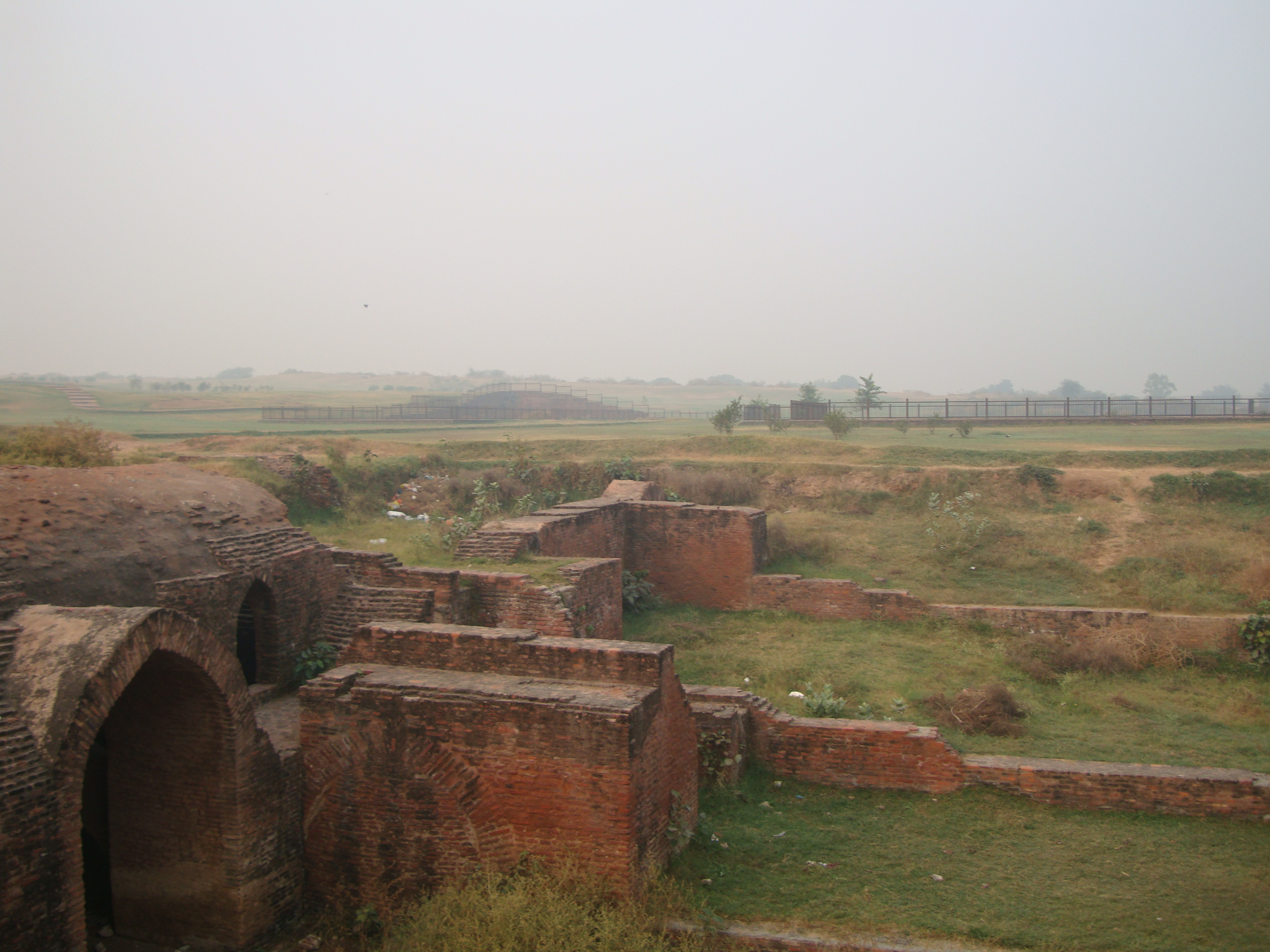
Karawan serai ruins at "Harsh ka tila" mound area spread over 1 km, Mughal period

=== British era ===
For their participation in the first war of independence, the Chaudharys and Lambardars of villages who participated in the rebellion in Haryana were deprived of their land and property. 368 people from Hisar and Gurugram were hanged or transported for life, and fines were imposed on the people of Thanesar (Rs 235,000), Ambala (Rs. 253,541) and Rohtak (Rs. 63,000 mostly on Ranghars, Shaikhs and Muslim Kasai).

== Tourism ==
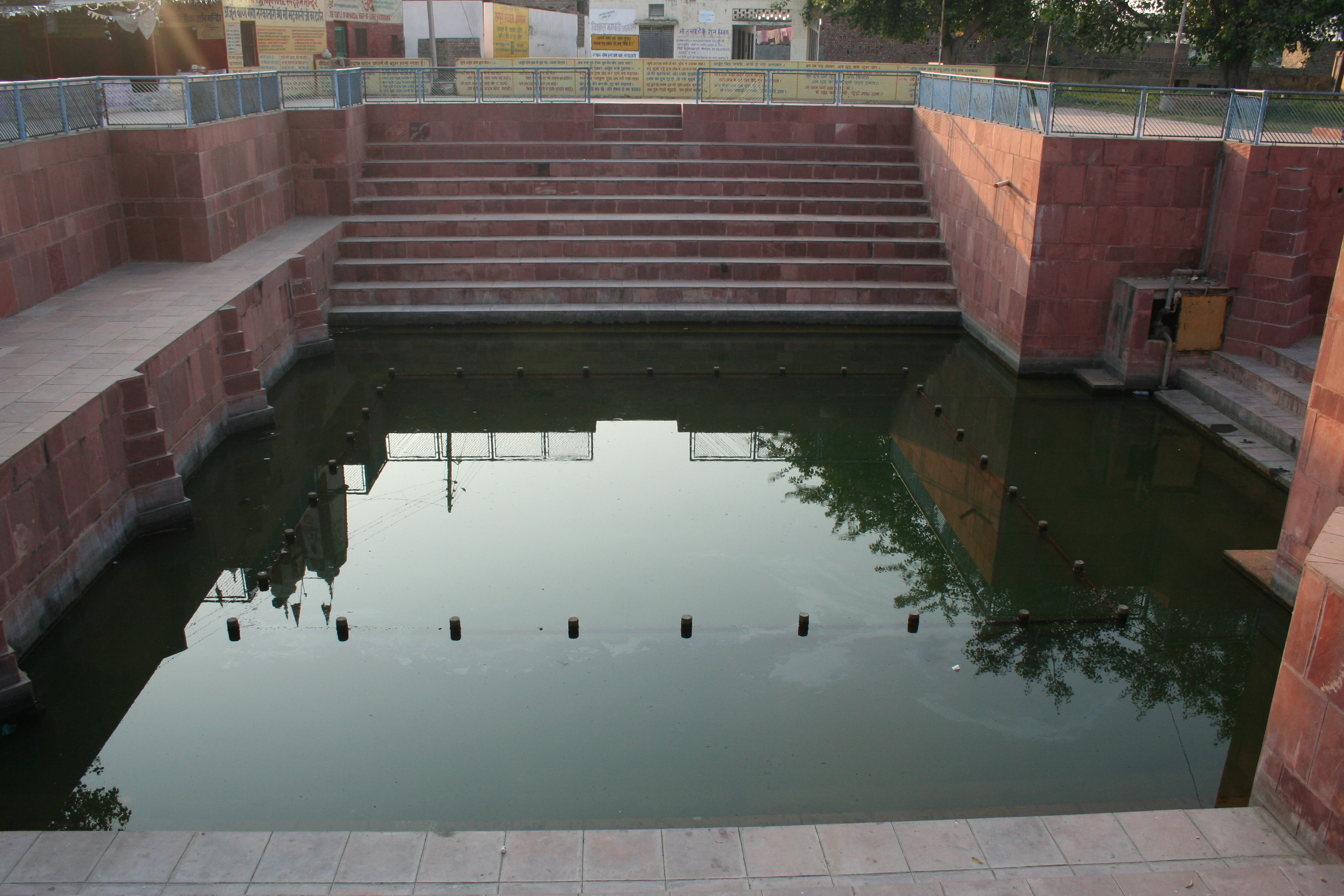
Bhishma Kund at Narkatari.

=== Religious ===
Thanesar derives its name from the word Sthaneshwar which means "place of god." The Sthaneshwar Mahadev Temple is believed to be the place where the Pandavas and Krishna prayed to Shiva and received his blessings for victory in the battle of Mahabharata. It is the central and the most important place in the 48 kos parikrama of Kurukshetra. 1.5 km from Thanesar on Kurukshetra-Pehowa road is the water tank named Bhishma Kund is believed to be the spot when Bhishma lay of the bed of arrows during the Mahabharata War.

== See also ==
- Tatka Village

== Bibliography ==
- Banabhatta (1897). The Harsa-carita of Bana. Translated by E. B. Cowell; F. W. Thomas. London : Royal Asiatic Society.
