= Bāṇabhaṭṭa =

7th-century Sanskrit writer and poet

- Born: Pritikuta
- Occupations: Poet, writer
- Works: Harshacharita, Kadambari
- Children: Bhūṣaṇabhaṭṭa (son)
- Parents: Chitrabhānu (father); Rājadevi (mother)
- Relatives: Mayūrabhaṭṭa (brother-in-law)

Bāṇabhaṭṭa (Sanskrit: बाणभट्ट) was a 7th-century Sanskrit prose writer and poet from India. He was the court poet of Emperor Harsha, during his reign at Kanyakubja. Bāna's principal works include a biography of Harsha, the Harshacharita and the novel Kadambari. Bāṇa died before finishing the novel and it was completed by his son Bhūṣaṇabhaṭṭa. Both these works are noted texts of Sanskrit literature. The other works attributed to him are the Caṇḍikāśataka and a drama, the Pārvatīpariṇaya. Banabhatta gets an applause as "Banochhistam Jagatsarvam" meaning Bana has described everything in this world and nothing is left.

== Biography ==
A detailed account regarding his ancestry and early life can be reconstructed from the introductory verses attached to the Kadambari and the first two ucchāvasas of the Harṣacarita, while the circumstances behind the composition of the Harṣacarita are described in the third ucchāvasa of the text. Harsacarita is considered as the first Indian work which may be regarded as a historical biography. It gives a vivid picture of life in the Indian countryside.

Bāna was born to Chitrabhānu and Rājadevi in the village of Pritikuta in a Kanyakubja Brahmin family. His mother died early leaving him in the loving care of his father. His father married again and had two more sons. After the death of his father when he was 14, Bāṇa led a colourful and wandering life with his half-brothers for a period but later came back to his native village. Here, on a summer day, on receiving a letter from Krishna, a cousin of Emperor Harsha, he met the emperor while he was camping near the town of Manitara. After receiving Bāna with mock signs of anger, the emperor showed him much favor.

== Works ==
- Bana (1898). The Parvati Parinaya of Banabhatta, with Sanskrit Commentary, English Notes and Tr., by T.R. Ratnam Aiyar. Madras.
- Bana (tr. G. Layne), Bāṇabhaṭṭa Kādambarī. A Classic Sanskrit Story of Magical Transformations (New York: Garland, 1991).
- Harshacharita: The Harshacharita (Sanskrit: हर्षचरित, romanized: Harṣacarita, lit. 'The deeds of Harsha') is the biography of Indian emperor Harsha by Banabhatta. The Harshacharita was the first composition of Bana and is considered to be the beginning of the writing of historical poetic works in the Sanskrit language.

== Biography Books ==
- Sakharam Vasudeo Dixit (1963). Bāṇabhaṭṭa: His Life & Literature. A.S. Dixit.
- Neeta Sharma (1968). Banabhatta: a literary study. Munshiram Manoharlal.
- K. Krishnamoorthy (1982). Banabhatta. Sahitya Akademi. ISBN 978-81-7201-674-6.
