= Aphsad inscription of Ādityasena =

Indian inscription

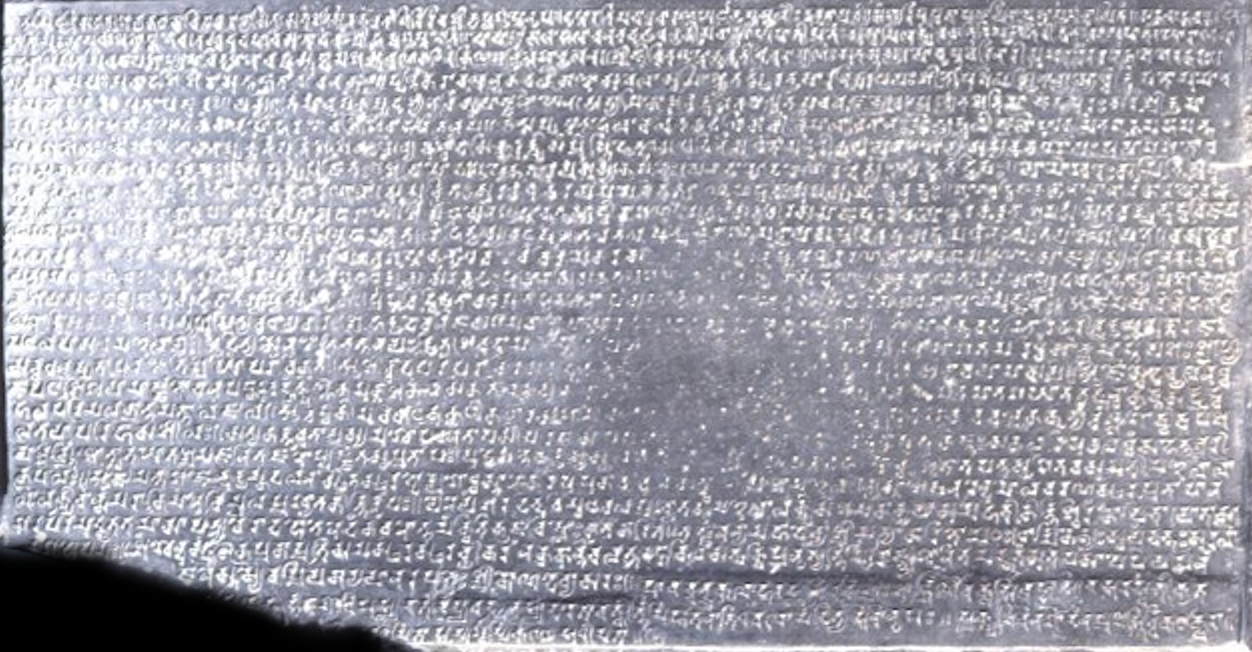
- Aphsad Stone of Adityasena, British Museum.
- Size: 85 cm width x 45 cm height
- Writing: Sanskrit, Kutila
- Created: Reign of Ādityasena (r. c. 655-680 CE)
- Place: Aphsad, Bihar
- Present location: British Museum (not on display)
- Registration: 1880.144

Location
- Aphsad (South Asia)

The Aphsad inscription of Ādityasena is an Indian inscription from the reign of the Later Gupta dynasty king Ādityasena (r. c. 655-680 CE). The inscription was found in 1880 by Markham Kittoe in the village of Apasadha, Bihar, and is now located in the British Museum.

== Content ==
=== Late Gupta dynasty ===
The inscription describes the genealogy and the deeds of the Late Gupta Dynasty kings up to Aditya-sena.

=== Fight against the Hunas ===
The inscription is especially known for mentioning that the Maukharis fought against the remnants of the Alchon Huns in the areas of the Gangetic Doab and Magadha (while the Aulikaras repelled them in the Malwa region). The Aphsad inscription of Ādityasena mentions the military successes of kings of the Later Gupta dynasty against the Maukharis, themselves past victors of the Hunas:

"The son of that king (Kumaragupta) was the illustrious Dâmôdaragupta, by whom (his) enemies were slain, just like the demons by (the god) Dâmôdara. Breaking up the proudly stepping array of mighty elephants, belonging to the Maukhari, which had thrown aloft in battle the troops of the Hûnas (in order to trample them to death)"

— Line 8 of the Aphsad inscription of Ādityasena.

=== Constructions ===
The inscription also records the establishment of two religious buildings: a temple of Viṣṇu by king Ādityasena following the wish of his mother Mahādevī Śrīmati, and the construction of a tank by Koṇadevīi, queen of Ādityasena.

== Text of the inscription ==
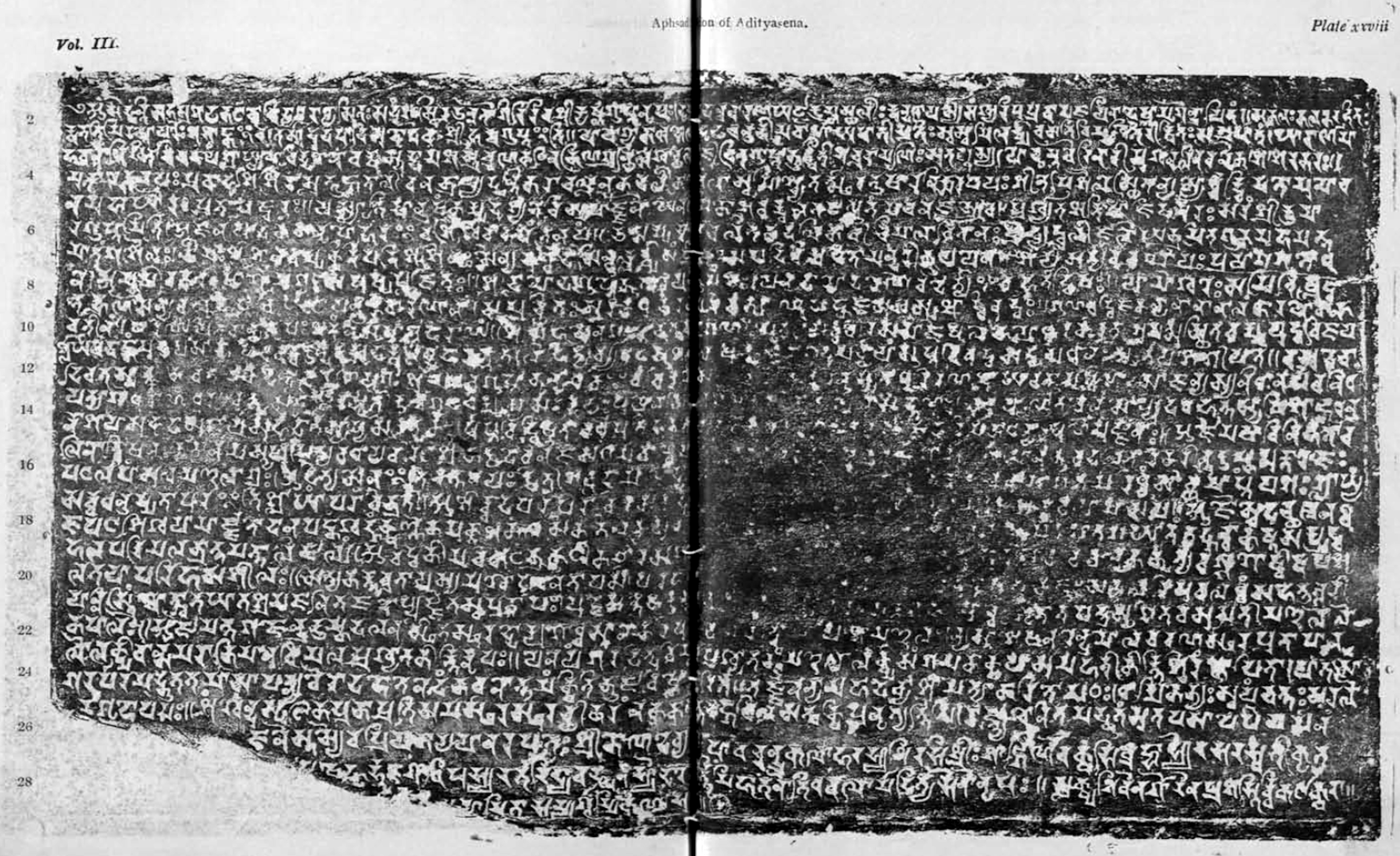
Aphsad inscription of Ādityasena (rubbing).

Om! There was a king, the illustrious Krishnagupta, who was like a mountain, in that (his) cities, like the slopes of a mountain, were crowded with thousands of elephants; in that he was attended by men of learning, as a mountain is inhabited by Vidyâdharas; in that he was of good descent, as a mountain is possessed of excellent bamboos; (and) in that he was firm (and) lofty; (and) whose arm played the part of a lion, in bruising the foreheads of the array of the rutting elephants of (his) haughty enemies, (and) in being victorious by (its) prowess over countless foes.
(Line 1.)-Just as the full-moon, destitute of spots, the destroyer of the darkness, was produced from the ocean, so from him there was born a son, the majestic one, named the illustrious Harshagupta, who,--raining down a terrible flight of arrows from (his) firm bow that was bent with ease at the befitting proper time, (and) being gazed upon with copious tears by (his enemies) who, averse to the abode of the goddess of fortune being with (him, her) own lord, were stupified (at being unable to prevent it),-was (always) displaying a glorious triumph, the written record as it were of terrible contests, in the guise of the rows of the knots of hard callous places, caused by wounds from many weapons, on (his) chest.
(L. 3.)-His son was the illustrious Jîvitagupta, the best among kings, who was a very-cold-rayed (moon) to (wither) the waterlilies that were the countenances of the women of (his) proud enemies. The very terrible scorching fever (of fear) left not (his) haughty foes, even though they stood on seaside shores that were cool with the flowing and ebbing currents of water, (and) were covered with the branches of plantain-trees severed by the trunks of elephants roaming through the lofty groves of palmyra-palms; (or) even though they stood on (that) mountain (Himâlaya) which is cold with the water of the rushing and waving torrents full of snow. Even still his superhuman deeds are regarded with astonishment by all mankind, like the leap of (the monkey Hanumat) the son of the Wind from the side of (the mountain) Kôshavardhana.
(L. 5.)-That king begat one son, by name the illustrious Kumâragupta, of renowned strength, a leader in battle; just as (the god) Hara begat a son, (Kârttikêya) who rides upon the peacock;--by whom, playing the part of (the mountain) Mandara, there was quickly churned that formidable milk-ocean, the cause of the attainment of fortune, which was the army of the glorious Îshânavarman a very moon among kings, (and) which had for (its) spreading rows of waves the plantain-trees that were wantonly shaken to and fro by the roaring wind (caused by the marching of the troops), (and) had (its) rocks, that were the ponderous and mighty rutting elephants (of the forces), whirled round and round by the masses of water that were the rising dust (stirred up by the soldiers). Cherishing heroism and adherence to the truth, (even) in (the possession of) wealth, he went to Prayâga; (and there), honourably decorated with flowers, plunged into a fire (kindled) with dry cow-dung cakes, as if (simply plunging to bathe) in water.

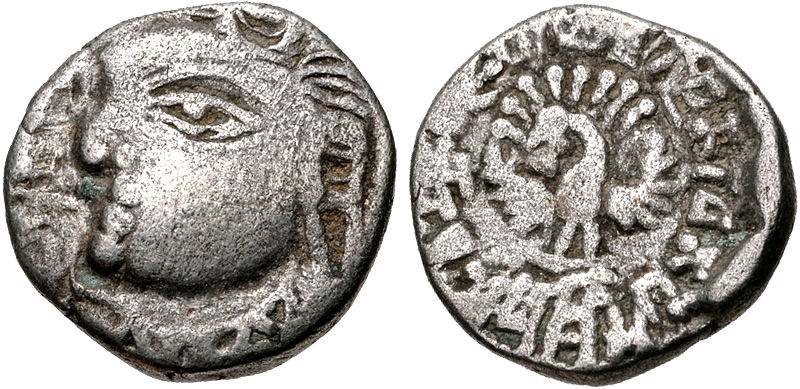
Coin of King Iśanavarman of the Maukhari of Kannauj, successors of the Guptas in the Gangetic region. Circa 535-553 CE. The ruler faces to the left, whereas in Gupta coinage the ruler faces to the right. This is possibly a symbol of antagonism and rivalry, as also seen on some similar coins of Toramana.

(L. 8.)-The son of that king was the illustrious Dâmôdaragupta, by whom (his) enemies were slain, just like the demons by (the god) Dâmôdara. Breaking up the proudly stepping array of mighty elephants, belonging to the Maukhari, which had thrown aloft in battle the troops of the Hûnas (in order to trample them to death), he became unconscious (and expired in the fight); (and then, waking again in heaven and) making a choice among the women of the gods, saying "(this one or that) belongs to me," he was revived by the pleasing touch of the waterlilies that were their hands. He, (while he was) king, gave away in marriage a hundred daughters of virtuous Brâhmans endowed with many ornaments and with youth, (and) dowered with a agrahâra-grants.
(L. 10.)-From him there was a son, the illustrious Mahâsênagupta, the leader, among brave men; who in all the assemblages of heroes acquired a (reputation for) valour (that stood) in the foremost rank;--whose mighty fame, marked with the honour of victory in war over the illustrious Susthitavarman, (and) [white], as a full-blown jasmine-flower or waterlily, or as a pure necklace of pearls pounded into little bits (?), is still constantly sung on the banks of (the river) Lôhitya, the surfaces of which are (so) cool, by the Siddhas in pairs, when they wake up after sleeping in the shade of the betel-plants that are in full bloom.
(L. 11.)- As (the god) Mâdhava, whose feet are graced by the attentions of (the goddess) Srî, (was born) from Vasudêva, so from him there was (a son), the illustrious Mâdhavagupta, finding pleasure only in prowess, whose feet were graced by the attentions of the goddess of fortune. He being remembered in the foremost rank . . . . . . . .; being the leader of those who acquire renown in war; (and) being a very store-house of goodness, the best of those who excel in the collection and bestowal of riches, the natural home of wealth, truth, and learning, (and) a firm bridge of religion,--there is no one on the earth . . . . . . . . . . . . . who is (as) worthy to be praised b virtuous people, (as he was). He also, (like the god), carried a discus in the palm of (his) hand; to him also belonged a bow made of horn, and a pleasing sword (which was employed) for the destruction of (his) enemies (and) the happiness of his friends; (and), when the slaughter of (his) foes had been achieved, . . . . . . . . . . . . was averted by him; . . . . . . . . . . . . people did obeisance . . . . , . . . . . . . . . . "(My) mighty enemies have been slain by me in battle; there remains nothing more for me to do,"-thus he, the hero, determined in his mind; (and then) with the desire to associate himself with the glorious Harshadêva . . . . . . .

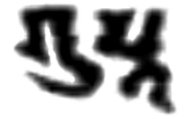
The suffix "-gupta" in the inscription.

(L. 15.)- His son was the illustrious one, named Âdityasêna, the best among kings, whose scimetar was sullied with a thick coating of dust in the shape of the pearls from the temples of the lordly elephants of (his) enemies that were split open (by it), . . . . . . . . . . . . . . . Maintaining the supreme renown, that (his) perfect praise, coming from . . . . . . . . . . . . (and) rising from the destruction of (his) enemies, is worthy to be lauded in the presence of all wielders of the bow,--a continuous line of blessings . . . . . . . . . . . . . . Cleaning with the edge of the silken cloth of a banner, (used) under the excuse of (wiping away) sweat in battle, (his) sword that was stained with the rut (of the elephants slain by him), and was covered with sand in the shape of the minute fragments of the pearls (from their foreheads) through. . . . . . . . . . . . that was broken to pieces, . . . . . . . .the destruction of rutting elephants, in the course of which many swarms of bees, led into a mistake by the copious fragrant juice that trickled forth, were attracted by their perfume. . . . . . . . . . . in battle which is full of terrible and repulsive frownings . . . . . . . . . . . . (he) is accustomed to laugh in a charming manner in the gatherings of (his) favourites and servants. His [wife], truthfully constant to (her) lord; performing penance with the excellent qualities of (her) mouth (?); . . . . . . . . . . . . laughter . . . . . . . . . . . Being . . . . . . . . . . . . (and) being the greatest cause of the destruction of the power of all (his) enemies, (and) being possessed of his own mighty prowess, even when he is full of weariness produced by the fatigue of drawing (his) sword forth (from its scabbard) and (dealing) blows (with it),- . . . . . . . . . . . . . the foreheads of rutting elephants in battle, [he is verily] a guardian of the world, by whose white umbrella the whole circuit of the earth is covered. He, the king, has had both (his) gleaming arms increased in bulk by splitting open the temples of rutting elephants in war; he has a halo of fame, [acquired] by destroying the power of many enemies; the darting fire of the prowess of (his) feet has had thrown into it (to feed it) the locks of hair on the tops of the heads of all (other) kings; he is possessed of fortune; (and) he has a pure and celebrated reputation (acquired) by honourable behaviour in war.
(L. 23.)- This best of temples has been caused to be made, on account of (the god) Vishnu, by him, the king, whose very great fame, (of) this (kind that has been described), white as the orb of the autumn moon (and) conferring renown on the (whole) circle of the world, was for a long time made angry by him through (his) desire for (her) association with (his) wealth, and then, becoming more wonderful than ever, went, forsooth, through the enmity natural to the condition of rival wives, to the other side of the ocean (in order to dwell there far away).
(L. 24.)- By his mother, the Mahâdêvî Srîmatî, a religious college has been caused to be built, resembling a house in the world of the gods, (and) has been given by herself in person to religious people.
(L. 25.)- By the queen, the illustrious Kônadêvî, the dear wife of that same king, in the performance of an excellent penance, there has been caused to be excavated a wonderful tank, the waters of which are eagerly drunk by people; which is full of drifting and glistening spray, resembling in lustre a shankha-shell, or the moon, or crystal; (and) in the waves of which, driven to and fro by the motion of the alligators, the birds disport themselves and the large fishes play about.
(L. 26.)- As long as a digit of the moon [remains] on the head of (the god) Hara, (and) (the goddess) Srî on the breast of Vishnu, (and) (the goddess) Sarasvatî . . . . . . . . . . . in the mouth of Brahman; as long as the earth [remains] on a hood of (Shêsha) the king of serpents; and as long as there is lightning in the interior of a cloud,--so long shall the king Adityasêna display here (in these works) (his) dazzling fame!
(L.27.)- (This) eulogy, (written in) beautiful letters, [has been composed, or engraved] by Sûkshmashiva, (a native of) the Gauda (country), who is thoroughly religious (and) very intelligent.

— John Faithfull Fleet Corpus Inscriptionum Indicarum: Inscriptions Of The Early Gupta Kings And Their Successors Vol. III.
