= Maukharis of Kannauj =

Early medieval dynasty in the Gangetic plains

Maukhari dynasty
- c. 510 CE–c. 606 CE
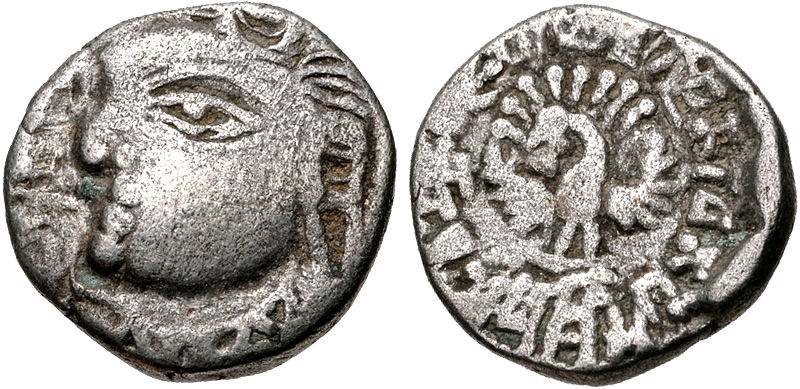
- Coin of King Iśanavarman of the Maukhari of Kanyakubja, c. 535-553 CE. The ruler faces to the left, whereas in Gupta coinage the ruler faces to the right. This is possibly a symbol of antagonism and rivalry, as also seen on some similar coins of Toramana.

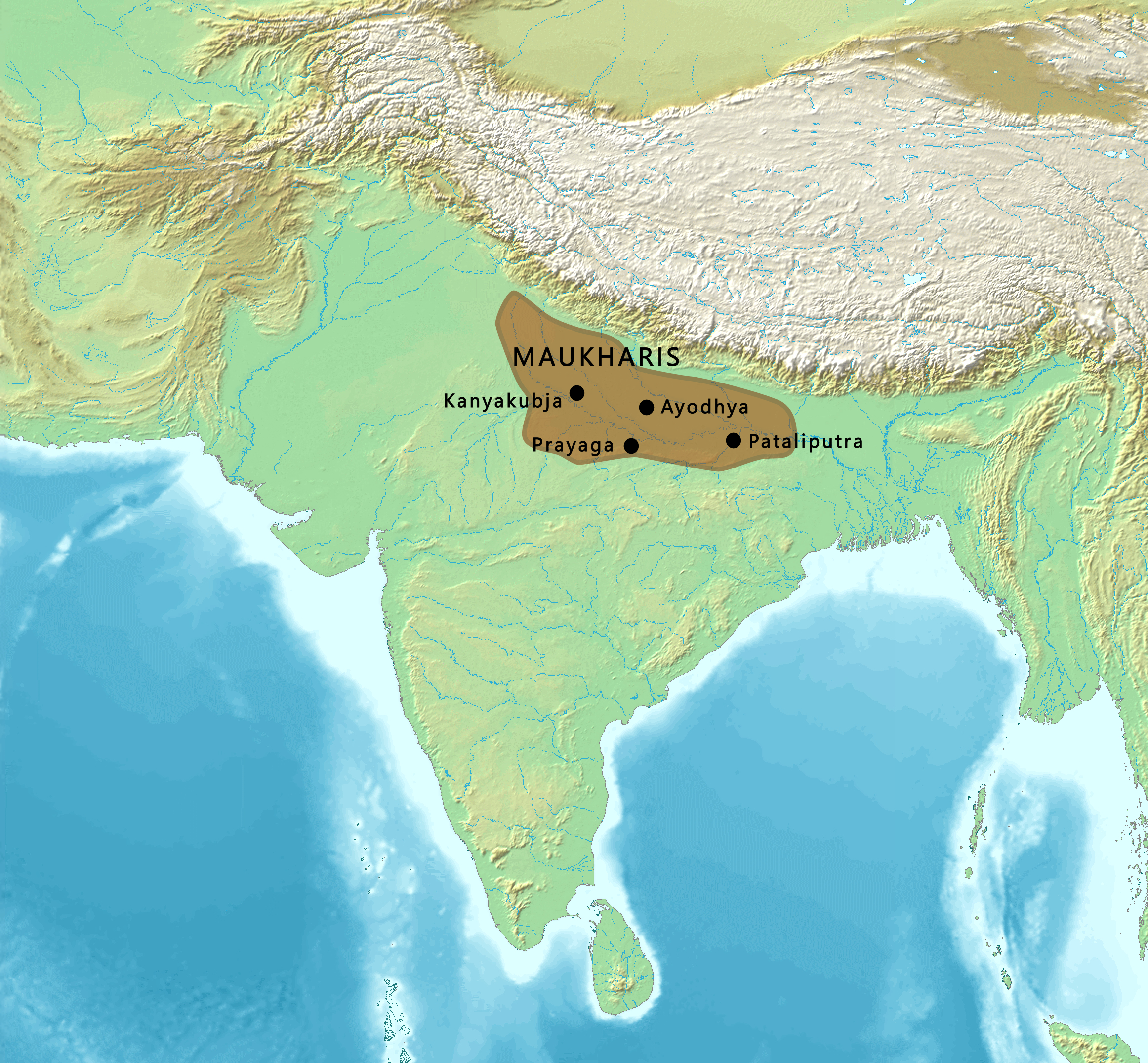
- Map of the dominions of Maukharis, with neighbouring polities, circa 550-600 CE, after the retreat of the Alchon Huns.
- Capital: Kanyakubja
- Common languages: Sanskrit
- Religion: Hinduism; Buddhism
- Government: Monarchy
- Maharajadhiraja
- Historical era: Medieval India
  - Established: c. 510 CE
  - Disestablished: c. 606 CE
Preceded by
Later Guptas
Alchon Huns
Maukharis of Gaya
Succeeded by
Later Guptas
Pushyabhuti dynasty
Gauda Kingdom

The Maukhari dynasty (Gupta script:, Mau-kha-ri) was a post-Gupta dynasty who controlled the vast plains of Ganga-Yamuna for almost a century from Kannauj. They earlier served as vassals of the Guptas and later of Harsha's Vardhana dynasty. The Maukharis established their independence during the mid-6th century. The dynasty ruled over much of Uttar Pradesh and Magadha. Around 606 CE, a large area of their empire was reconquered by the Later Guptas. According to Xuanzang, the territory may have been lost to King Shashanka of the Gauda Kingdom, who declared independence circa 600CE.

== Origin ==
Several Maukhari branches were found to be distributed across multiple regions of the subcontinent. The dynastic name is believed to derive from Mukhara, an eponymous progenitor. According to the Harshacharita by Bāṇabhaṭṭa, the marriage between princess Rājyaśrī and Grahavarman united the Pushyabhuti and Mukhara lineages. The dynasty claimed descent from Ashvapati, who is described in the Mahabharata as the ruler of Madra in the Punjab, thereby associating themselves with the Solar dynasty.

Epigraphic evidence indicates that the Maukhari presence extended beyond northern India. The Chandravalli inscription records that a branch of the family resided in the Karnataka region, in the vicinity of Punnata. Based on references in the Sanskrit play Kaumudi Mahotsava, historian E. A. Pires hypothesized that the Maukharis ruled Magadha prior to the emergence of the Gupta Empire. However, modern historical consensus rejects this theory, as the literary evidence is considered insufficient to support the claim.

The earliest Maukhari inscription has been found in Gaya dating back to the third-century BCE on a clay seal and the Maukharis continued to have a recorded presence in Gaya early in the 6th century CE.

== History ==
The main sources of history regarding the Maukharis of Kannauj include references in texts like the Harshacharita and Mañjuśrī-mūla-kalpa, the travelogues of foreign visitors particularly from China and the inscriptions left both by themselves and by their rivals including the Later Gupta dynasty.

After travelling from Gaya in Bihar, Harivarman, the first Maukhari ruler of this branch left an inscription dated to 487 CE in Sidhi district of Madhya Pradesh and this indicates that he was originally a chief under Buddhagupta of the Imperial Guptas. His son, Adityavarman, married the sister of Harshagupta of the Later Gupta dynasty. However the first ruler of this line to use the title of maharajadhiraja was his son, Ishanavarman. The Aphsad inscription of Ādityasena of the Later Guptas gives information that Ishanavarman defeated the Alchon Huns in battle while the Haraha inscription gives information on further military victories against the Gaudas, Andhras and the Sulikas (theorised by some scholars to be the Chaulukyas). Despite marital alliances between them, the Maukharis had a rivalry with the Later Guptas of Magadha. Ishanavarman was succeeded by one of his sons, Sarvavarman in approximately 560 CE who in turn was succeeded by Avantivarman in the 580s. Avantivarman was known by various titles including Paramesvara and "pride of the race". Under his rule, the Maukhari kingdom spread from Thaneshwar in the West to Nalanda district in the east.

The last Maukhari ruler was Grahavarman who reigned from c. 600 to 605 CE. He was married to a princess of the Pushyabhuti dynasty leading to an alliance between the two kingdoms however he was killed in battle by Devagupta of Malwa and the Maukhari territories where eventually absorbed into the territory of Harsha.

=== Succession ===
The Vardhana dynasty (also called "Pushyabhuti dynasty") ultimately succeeded the Maukhari dynasty, but it had originally only been a small polity around their capital Sthaneshvara (Thanesar). According to Hans T. Bakker, their ruler Aditya-Vardhana (or Aditya-Sena) was probably a feudatory to the Maukhari ruler Sharvavarman. His successor Prabhakaravardhana may have also been a feudatory to the Maukhari king Avantivarman in his early days. Prabhakara's daughter Rajyashri married Avantivarman's son Grahavarman. As a result of this marriage, Prabhakara's political status increased significantly, and he assumed the imperial title Parama-bhattaraka Maharajadhiraja ("the one to whom the other kings bow because of his valour and affection").

== Religion ==
The Maukharis were orthodox Hindus. Hinduism received state support, but Buddhism also persisted as a prominent religion.

== Army ==
The Maukhari army consisted of elephants, cavalry and infantry. Ishanavarman in all probability would have taken much pains to reorganise the army and make it strong and worthy. The Maukhari strategy mainly focused on deploying elephant corps to crush the enemy armies. They were used against the Alchon Huns and the Later Gupta armies. The Maukharis fought against the remnants of the Alchon Huns in the areas of the Gangetic Doab and Magadha, as documented in the Aphsad inscription, while the Aulikaras repelled them in the Malwa region. The Aphsad inscription of Ādityasena mentions the military successes of kings of the Later Gupta dynasty against the Maukharis, themselves past victors of the Alchon Huns:

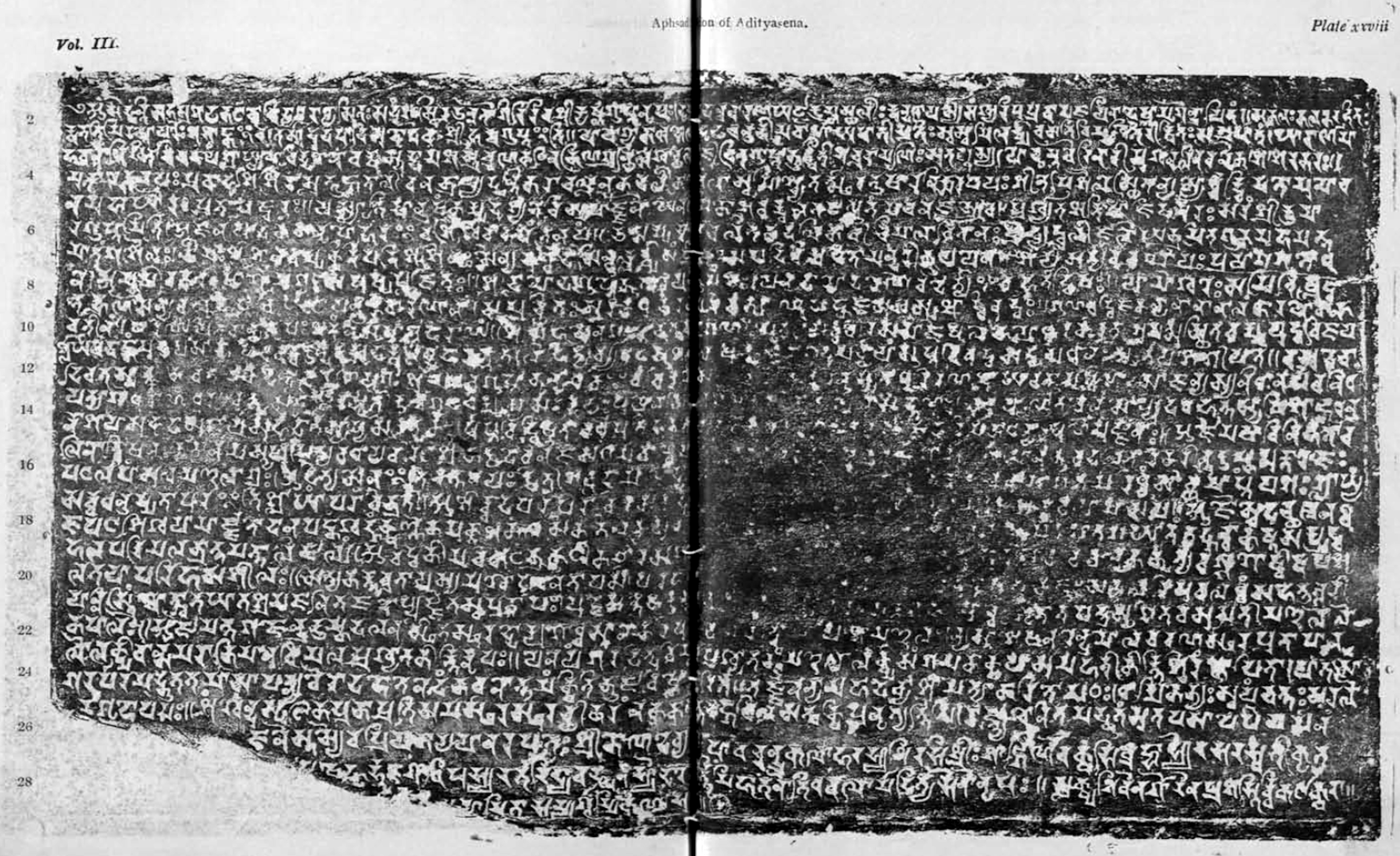
The Aphsad inscription of Ādityasena

"The son of that king (Kumaragupta) was the illustrious Dâmôdaragupta, by whom (his) enemies were slain, just like the demons by (the god) Dâmôdara. Breaking up the proudly stepping array of mighty elephants, belonging to the Maukhari, which had thrown aloft in battle the troops of the Hûnas (in order to trample them to death), he became unconscious (and expired in the fight)."

— Line 8 of the Aphsad inscription of Ādityasena.

The Maukharis, rather than the Guptas, were therefore the key actors in repelling the Hunas.

== Administration ==
Kanyakubja, the Maukhari capital, grew in prosperity and importance as a great cosmopolitan city. After the demise of the Maukharis, it even became the capital of Emperor Harsha. Hence, Kanyakubja was largely contested by imperial powers.

The first three Maukhari kings are mentioned in the inscriptions as Maharaja, but their successors assumed grander titles showing an increase in power and prestige. Ishanavarman was the first Maukhari ruler to adopt the title Maharajadhiraja (lit., King of Great Kings).

== Cultural and international exchanges ==
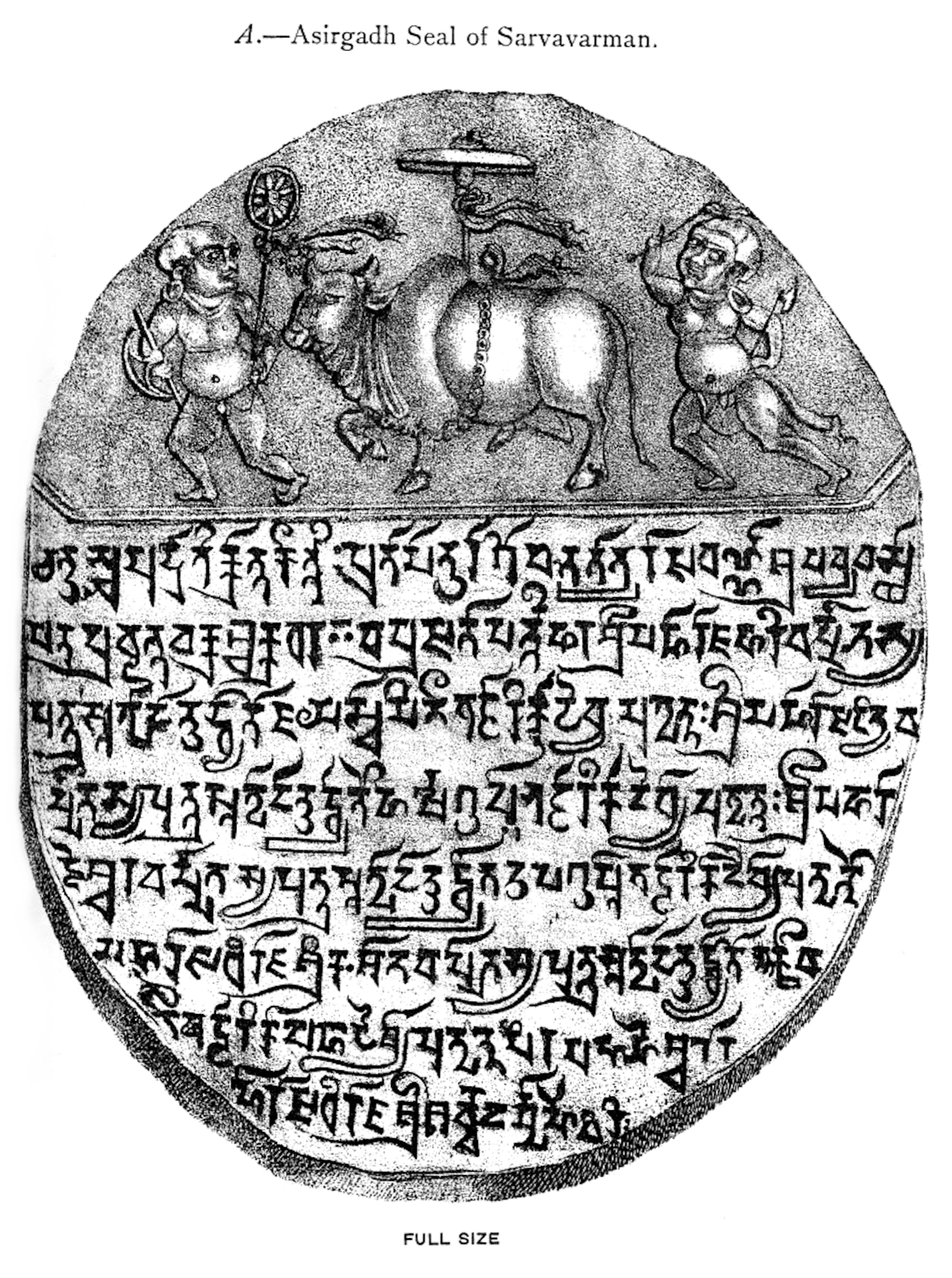
Asirgarh seal inscription of Sharvavarman, Maukhari dynasty, 6th century .

The Maukhari kings were patrons of poets and writers and many literary works were composed during their reign. Various seals and inscriptions are known, such as the Asirgarh seal inscription of Sharvavarman, or the Haraha inscription of Isanavarman, discovered near the village of Harara in the Barabanki district, Uttar Pradesh and dated to Vikrama Samvat 610 (ie 554 CE), which record the genealogy of the Maukharis.

=== Contacts with the Sasanian Empire ===
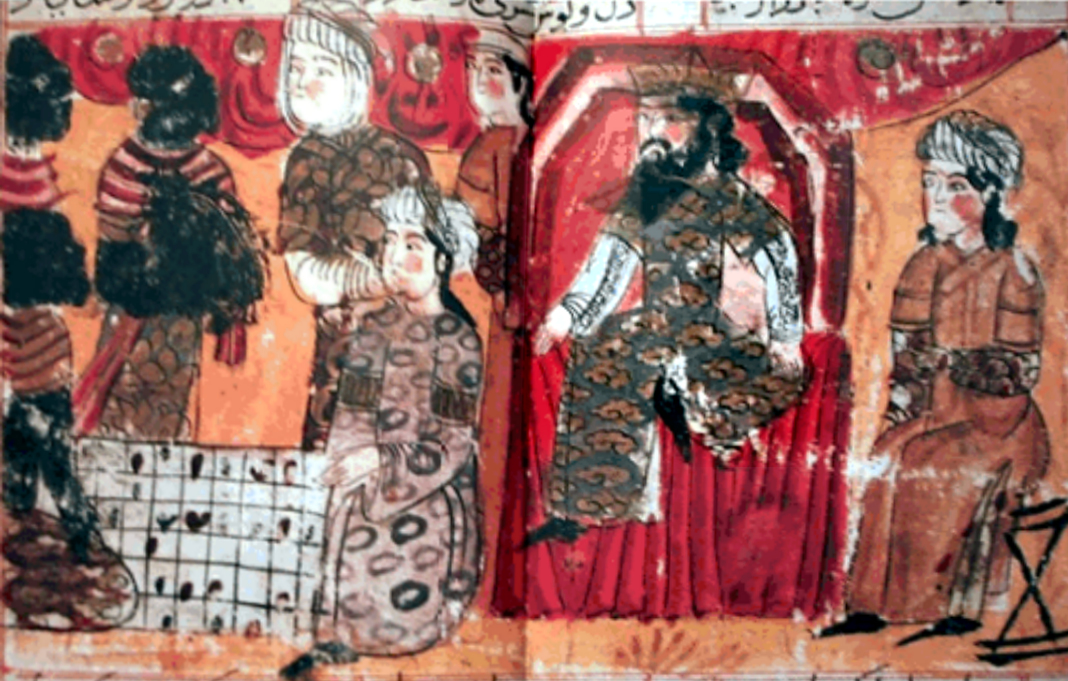
Sasanian Empire King Khosrow I sits before the chessboard, while his vizir and the Indian envoy of Kannauj are playing chess. Shahnama, 10th century CE.

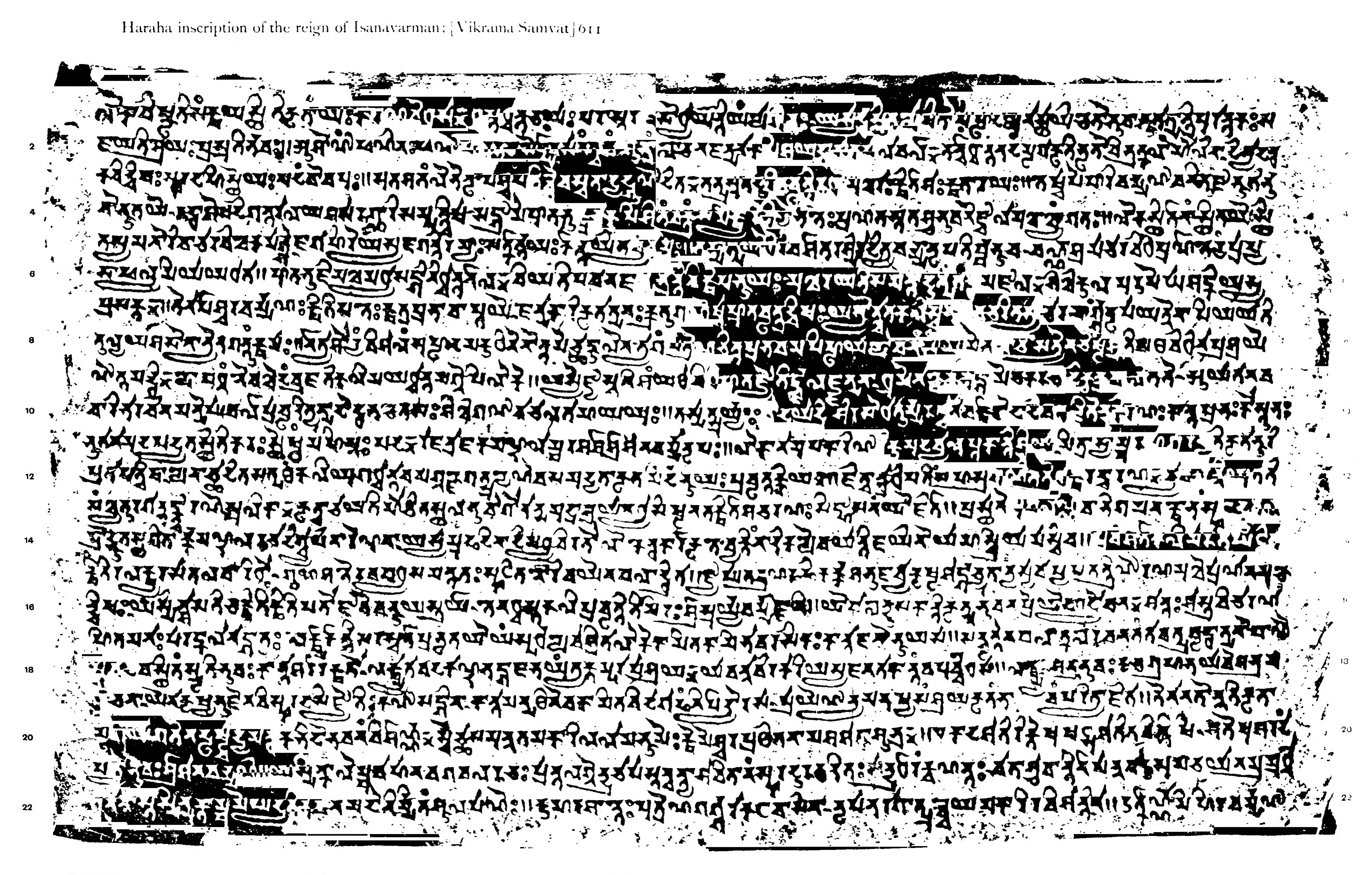
The Harahara inscription of Ishanavarman. The inscription, dated to Vikrama Samvat 610 (ie 554 CE), records the genealogy of the Maukharis.

With the end of Hunnic power, new contacts were established between India and the Sasanian Persia. Intellectual games such as chess and backgammon demonstrated and celebrated the diplomatic relationship between Khosrow I and a "great king of India." The vizier of the Indian king invented chess as a cheerful, playful challenge to Emperor Khosrow. It seems that the Indian ruler who sent the game of chess to Khosrow was the Maukhari monarch Śarvavarman of Kannauj, between the beginning of Śarvavarman's reign in 560/565 and the end of Khosrow's reign in 579. When the game was sent to Iran it came with a letter which read: "As your name is the King of Kings, all your emperorship over us connotes that your wise men should be wiser than ours. Either you send us an explanation of this game of chess or send revenue and tribute us." Khosrow's grand vizier successfully solved the riddle and figured out how to play chess. In response the wise vizier created the game backgammon and sent it to the Indian court with the same message. The Indian king was not able to solve the riddle and was forced to pay tribute.

== Rulers ==
The known Maukhari rulers of madhya-desha include:

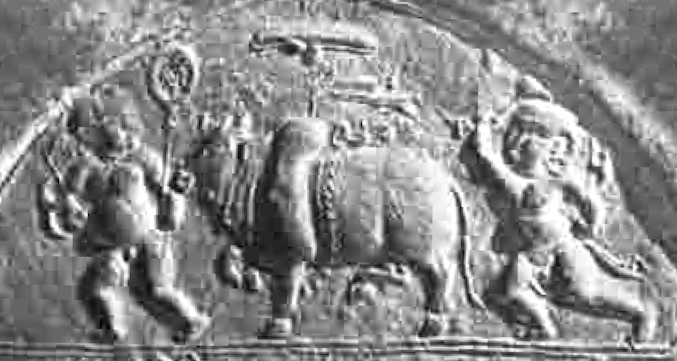
Maukhari design on a Nalanda Clay Seal of Sharvavarman.

- Harivarman
- Adityavarman
- Ishvaravarman (Iśvaravarman)
- Ishanavarman (Iśanavarman), r.c. 550–574 CE
- Sharvavarman (Śarvavarman), r. c. 574–586 CE
- Avantivarman
- Grahavarman, r. c. 600–605 CE

== Barabar branch of Maukhari rulers ==
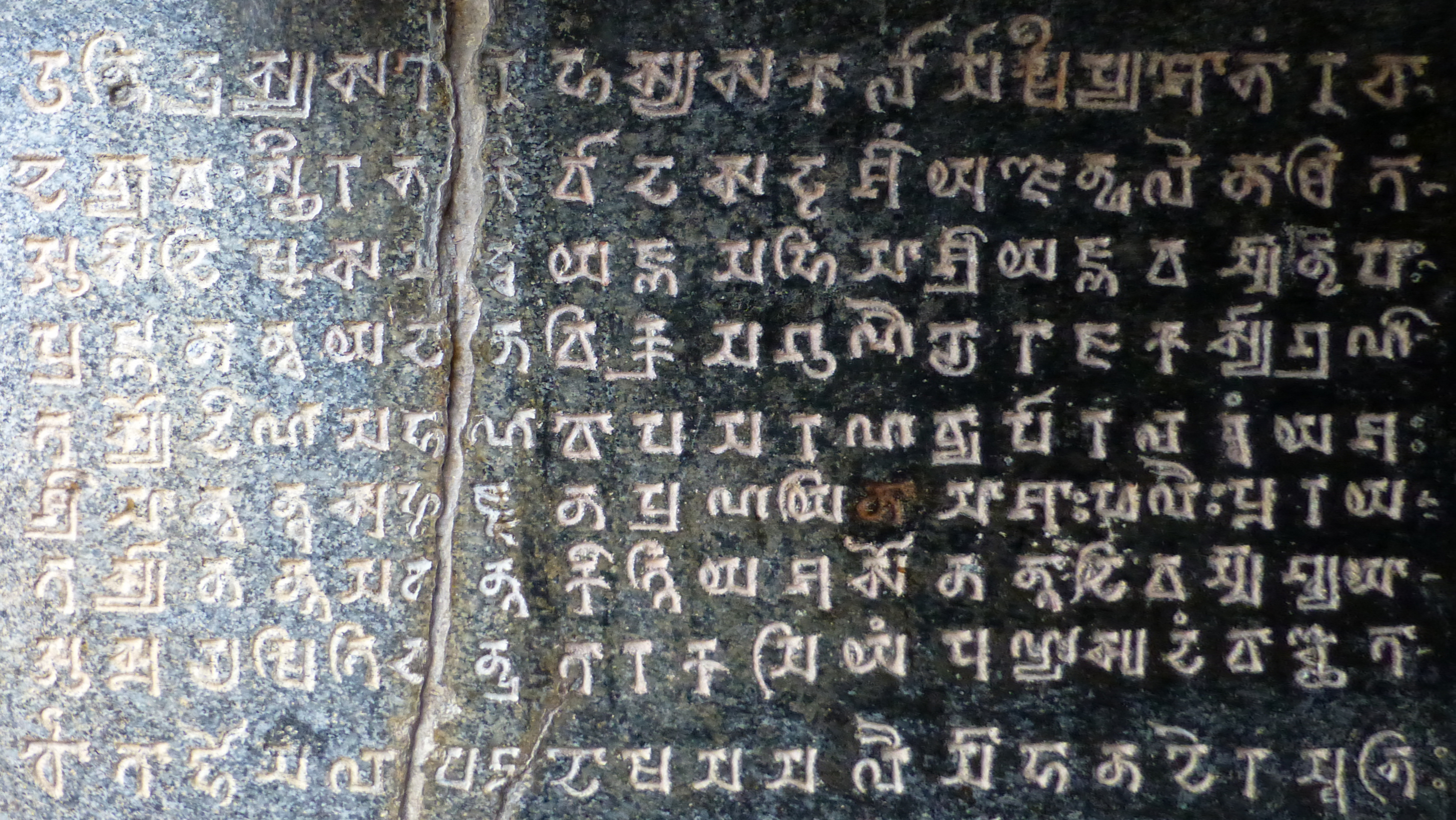
The Gopika Cave Inscription of Anantavarman (left half).

The Barabar Cave inscriptions attest the existence of another Maukhari branch. This branch ruled as feudatories, probably that of the Later Guptas. The known rulers of this branch include:

- Nrpa Shri Yajnavarman
- Nrpa Samantachudamani Shri Shardulavarman
- Anantavarman
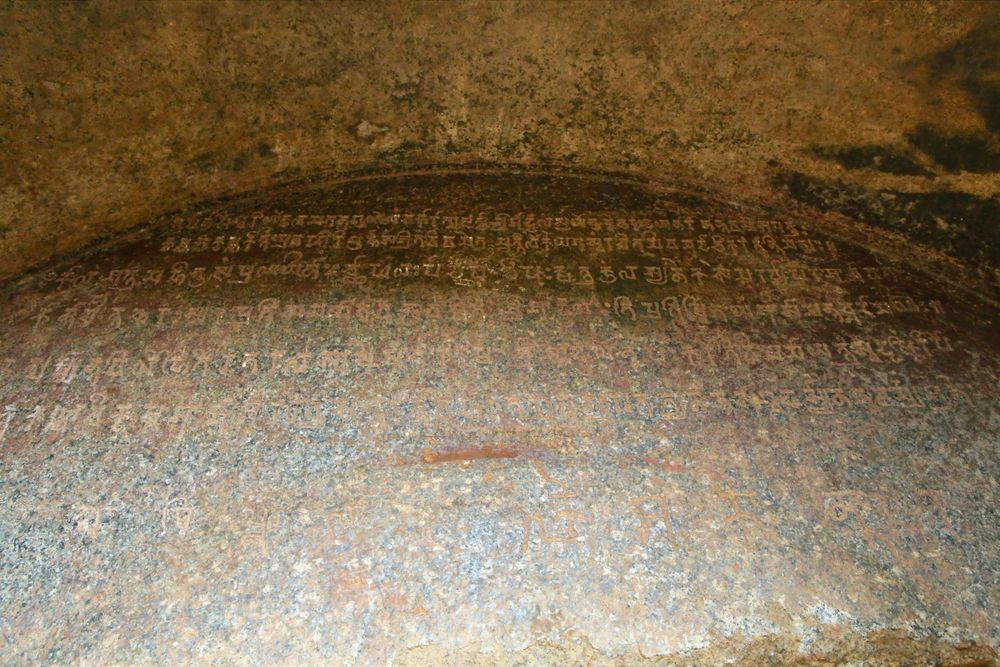
Lomas Rishi cave inscription of Anantavarman

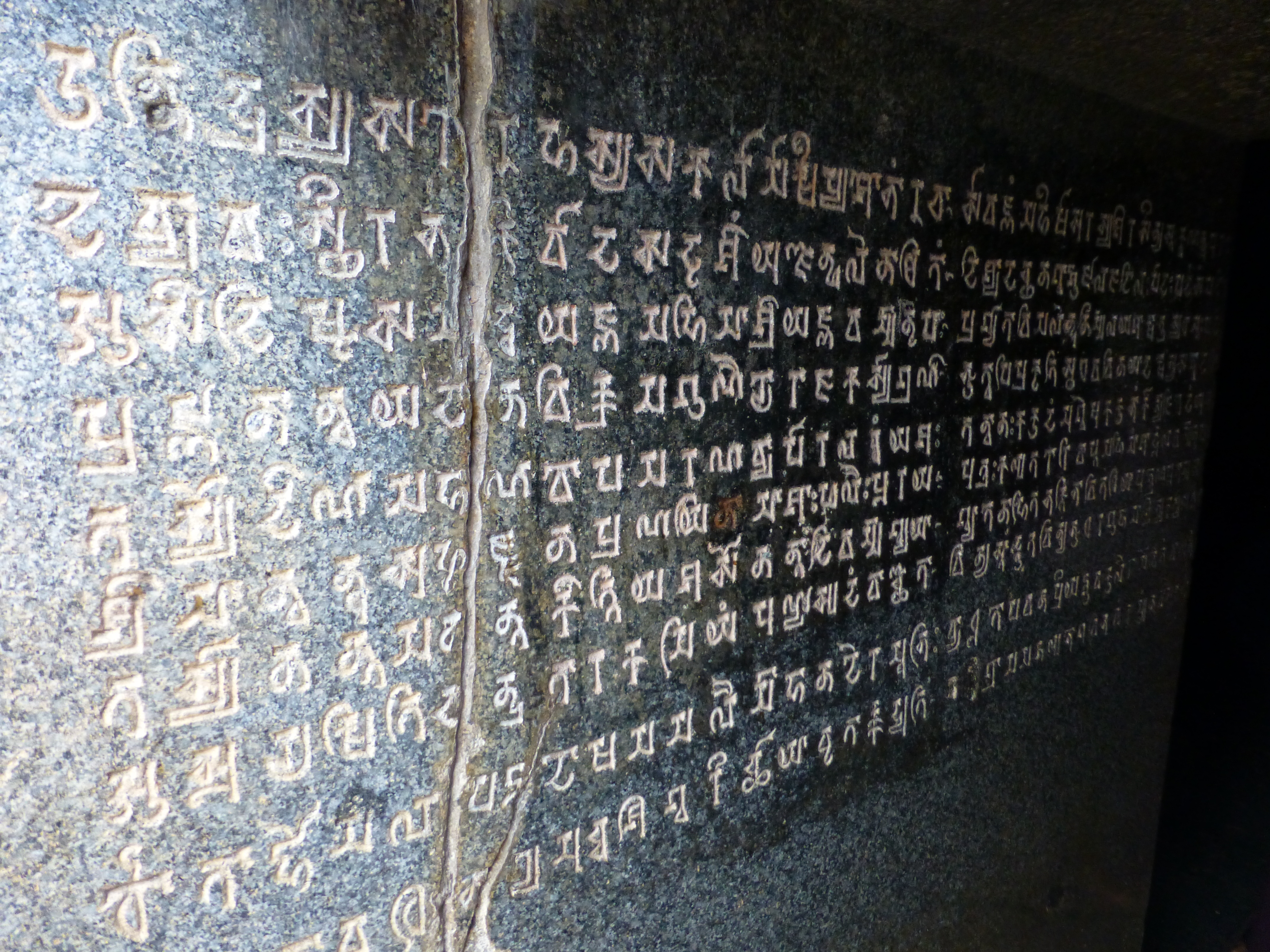
Gopika Cave Inscription of Anantavarman

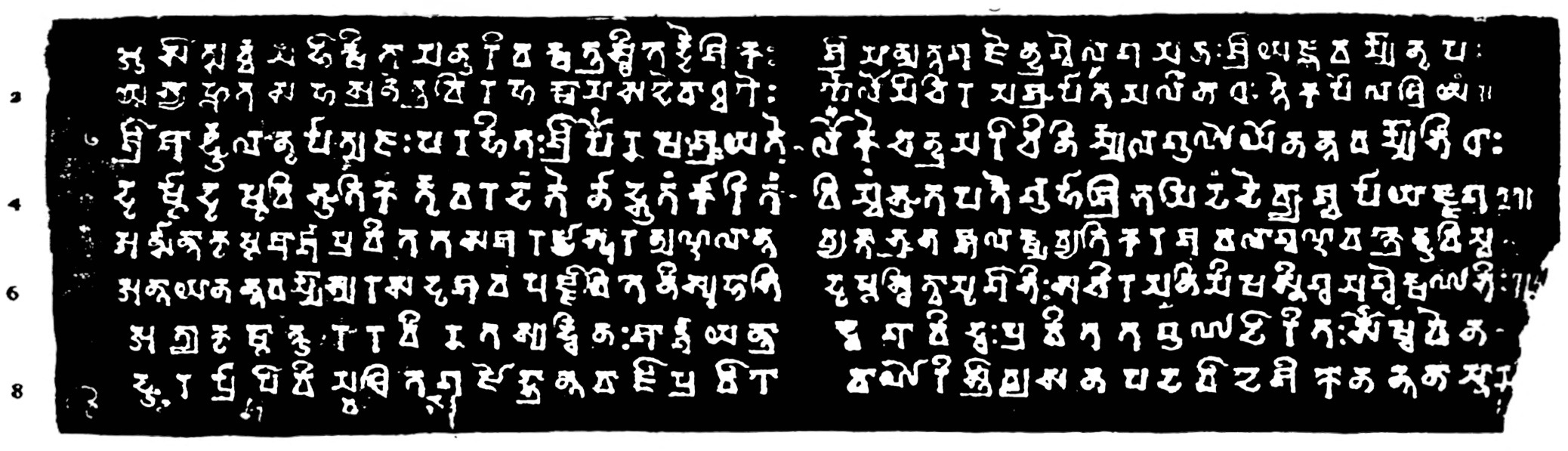
Vadathika Cave Inscription of Anantavarman

In some of the Barabar Caves inscriptions, the words referring to the Ajivikas appear to have been defaced, although the rest of the text appears intact. E. Hultzsch theorised that the defacement took place when the Maukhari ruler Ananta-varman installed Hindu images at the Caves. However, Basham dismisses this theory, noting that there is little evidence to support this view and the only cave in which the word Ajivikehi remains intact is among the three caves where Ananta-varman installed a Hindu image. According to Basham, since the defacement is selective, it must have taken place when the Brahmi script had still not been forgotten, likely some time before the 5th century CE.

== See also ==
- Megasthenes
- List of Hindu empires and dynasties

== Bibliography ==
- Thaplyal, Kiran Kumar (1985). Inscriptions of the Maukharīs, Later Guptas, Puṣpabhūtis, and Yaśovarman of Kanauj. Indian Council of Historical Research.
- Hans Bakker (2014). The World of the Skandapurāṇa. BRILL. ISBN 978-90-04-27714-4.
- Ronald M. Davidson (2012). Indian Esoteric Buddhism: A Social History of the Tantric Movement. Columbia University Press. ISBN 978-0-231-50102-6.
- Basham, A.L. (1951). History and Doctrines of the Ājīvikas. London: Luzac. Reprinted by Moltilal Banarsidass in 1981
