= Charles Wilkins =

English typographer and scholar (1749-1836)

Sir Charles Wilkins KH FRS
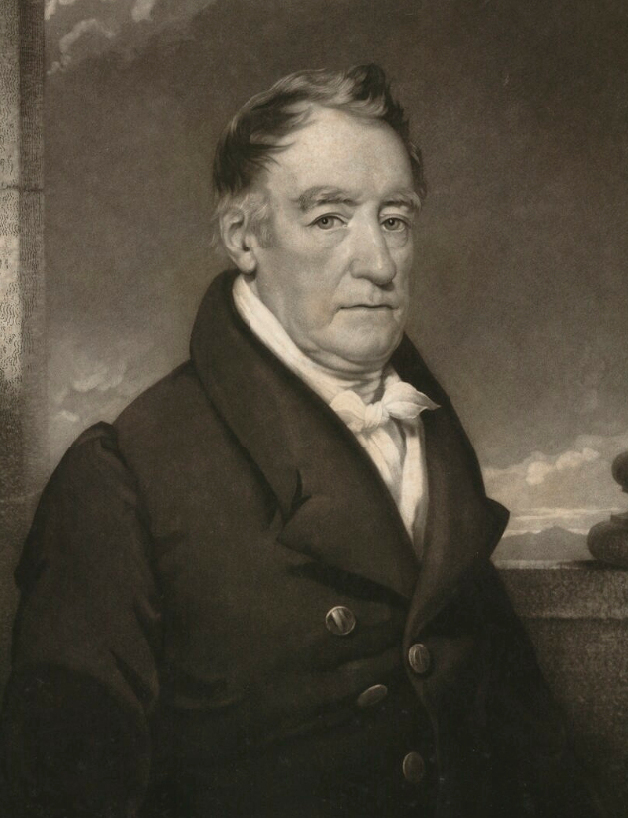
- Wilkins, in an mezzotint engraving by John Sartain, after a painting by James Godsell Middleton. Published in 1830.
- Born: 1749
- Died: 13 May 1836 (aged 86–87)
- Citizenship: England
- Occupations: Orientalist, typographer

Sir Charles Wilkins KH FRS (1749 – 13 May 1836) was an English typographer and scholar who co-founded The Asiatic Society. He is notable as the first translator of the Bhagavad Gita into English. He supervised Panchanan Karmakar to create one of the first Bengali typefaces. In 1788, Wilkins was elected a member of the Royal Society.

== Birth and childhood ==
He was born at Frome in Somerset in 1749. He trained as a printer. In 1770, he went to India as a printer and writer in the East India Company's service. His facility with language allowed him to quickly learn Persian and Bengali. He created with his own hands the first type for printing Bengali. He published the first typeset book in the language, earning himself the name "the Caxton of India". He also designed type for publications of books in Persian. In 1781, he was appointed as translator of Persian and Bengali to the Commissioner of Revenue and as superintendent of the company's press. He successfully translated a Royal inscription in Kutila characters, which were thitherto indecipherable.

In 1784, Wilkins helped William Jones establish the Asiatic Society of Bengal.

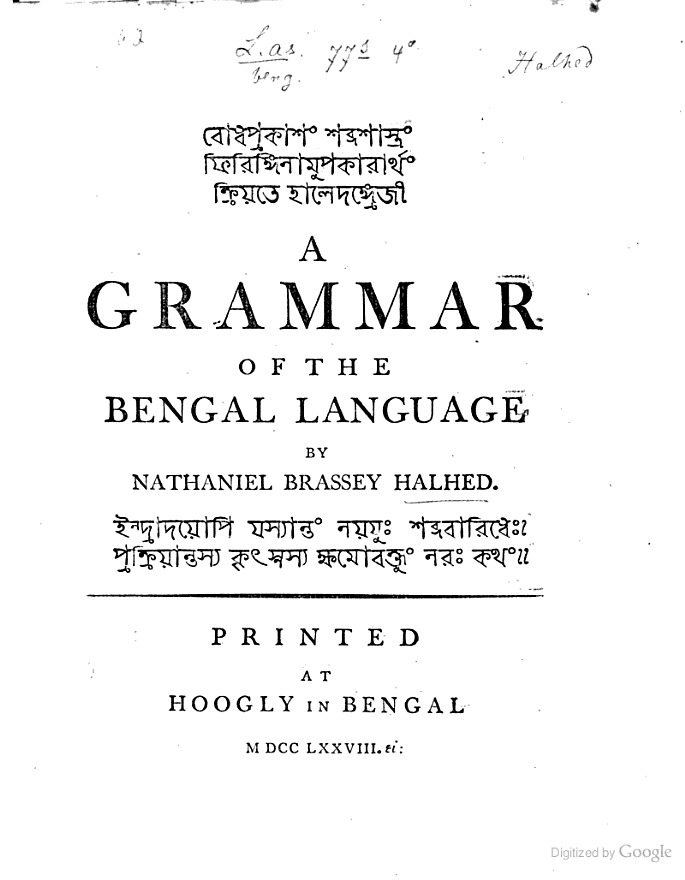
Title page of the first Bengali typeface printed book A Grammar of the Bengal Language, 1778

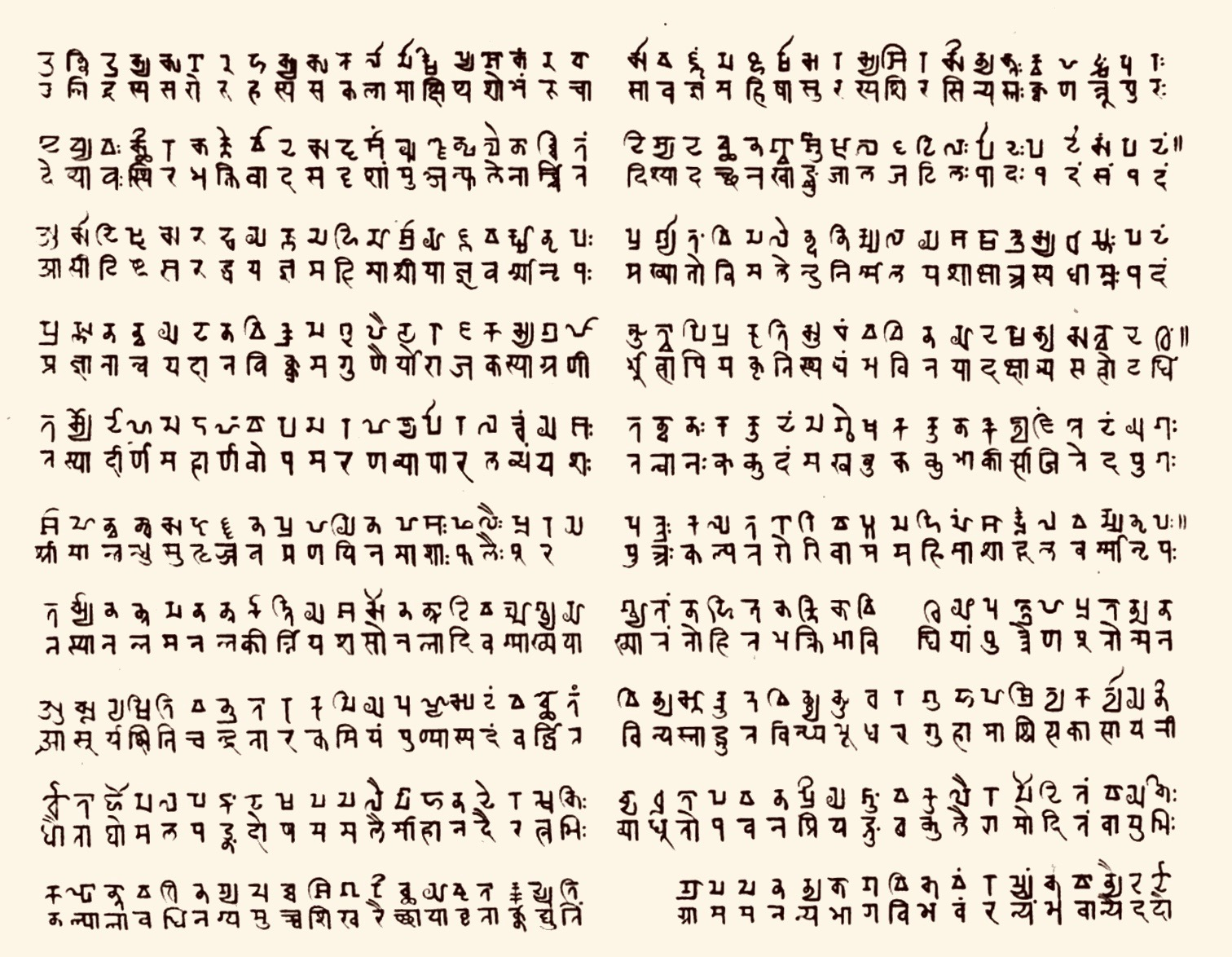
Decipherment of the Gopika Cave Inscription (6th century CE, Late Brahmi), with the original script in Late Brahmi, and proposed Devanagari line-by-line transliteration by Charles Wilkins in 1785.

== Work ==
Wilkins moved to Benares (Varanasi), where he studied Sanskrit under Kalinatha, a Brahmin pandit. At this period he began work on his translation of the Mahabharata, securing strong support for his activities from the governor of British India, Warren Hastings. Though he never completed the translation, portions were later published. The most important was his version of the Gita, published in 1785 as 'Bhagvat-geeta', or Dialogues of Krishna and Arjun (London: Nourse, 1785). In his preface Wilkins argued that the Gita was written to encourage a form of monotheist "unitarianism" and to draw Hinduism away from the polytheism he ascribed to the Vedas. He had a hobby to learn about other religions. He was also a scholar of Islam. He stayed in India for 16 years (1770–1786). He also made visits to holy shrines of other religions to learn about their customs. During a visit to Varanasi, he made a stop at Patna, and visited Patna Sahib Gurudwara, the birthplace of Guru Gobind Singh Ji. He wrote his account of this visit titled as 'Sikhs and their College at Patna'. He writes about Dasam Granth there and notes in this article. Meanwhile, inscriptions of the 6th century CE in late Brahmi script were deciphered in 1785 by Charles Wilkins, who published an essentially correct translation of the Gopika Cave Inscription written by the Maukhari king Anantavarman. Wilkins seems to have relied essentially on the similarities with later Brahmic scripts, such as the script of the Pala period and early forms of Devanagari.

== Translation to other languages ==
His translation of the Gita was itself soon translated into French (1787) and German (1802). It proved to be a major influence on Romantic literature and on European perception of Hindu philosophy. William Blake later celebrated the publication in his picture The Bramins, exhibited in 1809, which depicted Wilkins and Brahmin scholars working on the translation.

With Hastings' departure from India, Wilkins lost his main patron. He returned to England in 1786, where he married Elizabeth Keeble. In 1787 Wilkins followed the Gita with his translation of The Heetopades of Veeshnoo-Sarma, in a Series of Connected Fables, Interspersed with Moral, Prudential and Political Maxims (Bath: 1787). He was elected a fellow of the Royal Society in 1788. In 1800, he was invited to take up the post of the first director of the India House Library, which became over time the world-famous 'India Office Library' (now British Library – Oriental Collections). In 1801 he became librarian to the East India Company, He was named examiner at Haileybury when a college was established there in 1805. During these years he devoted himself to the creation of a font for Devanagari, the "divine script". In 1808 he published his Grammar of the Sanskrita Language. King George IV gave him the badge of the Royal Guelphic Order and he was knighted in recognition of his services to Oriental scholarship in 1833. He died in London at the age of 86.

In addition to his own translations and type designs, Wilkins published a new edition of John Richardson's Persian and Arabic dictionary – A Vocabulary Persian, Arabic, and English; Abridged from the Quarto Edition of Richardson's Dictionary as Edited by Charles Wilkins, Esq., LL.D., F.R.S. – By David Hopkins, Esq., Assistant Surgeon on the Bengal Establishment in 1810. He also published a catalogue of the manuscripts collected by Sir William Jones, who acknowledged his indebtedness to Wilkins.

== Publications ==
- The Bhăgvăt-gēētā, or dialogues of Krĕĕshnă and Ărjŏŏn; in eighteen lectures; with notes. London: C. Nourse. 1785. OCLC 1016217438.
- The Hĕĕtōpădēs of Vĕĕshnŏŏ-Sărmā, in a series of connected fables, interspersed with moral, prudential, and political maxims. Bath: R. Cruttwell. 1787. OCLC 4289711.
- The Seeks and their College at Patna (1781) by Charles Wilkins, published within: Asiatic Researches: Or, Transactions of the Society Instituted in Bengal, for Enquiry Into the History and Antiquities, the Arts and Sciences, and Literature of Asia (Calcutta, India: Asiatick Society, Vol. I, 1788, pp. 288–294)
- The story of Dooshwanta and Sakoontalā. London: F. Wingrave. 1795. OCLC 1190986595.
- A Grammar of the Sanskrĭta language. London: W. Bulmer. 1808. OCLC 459028943.
