= Sharvavarman =

Maharajadhiraja of Kanyakubja from 560 to 575

- Maharajadhiraja
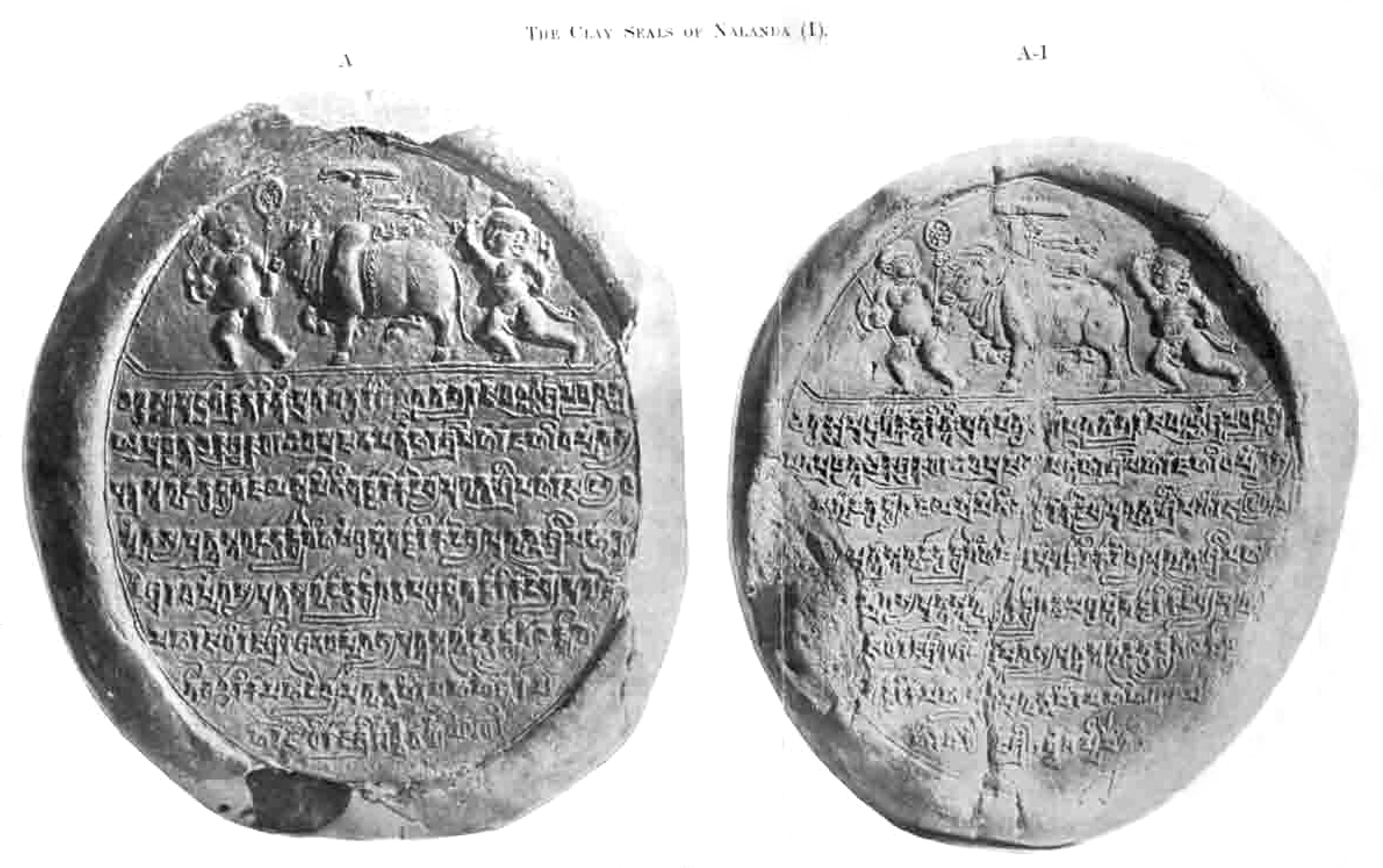
- Nalanda clay seals of Sharvavarman

Maharajadhiraja of Kanyakubja
- Reign: c. 560-575 CE
- Predecessor: Ishanavarman
- Successor: Avantivarman
- Issue: Avantivarman
- Dynasty: Maukhari
- Father: Ishanavarman
- Mother: Lakshamivati

Find spots of seals belonging to Sharvavarman

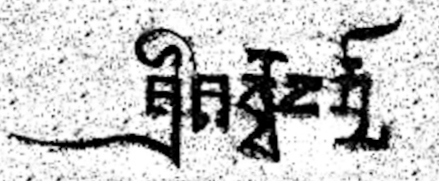
"Lord Sharvavarman" in the Asirgarh seal: "Śrī Śa-rvva-va-rmmā"

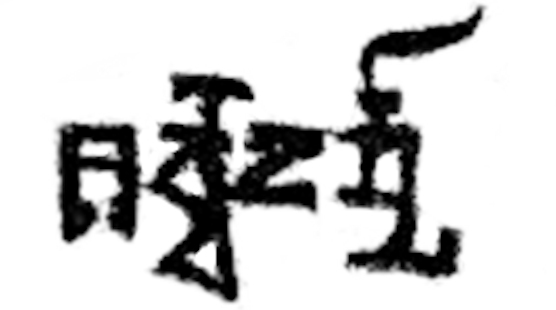
Sharvavarman (Brahmi script: 𑀰𑀭𑁆𑀯𑁆𑀯𑀯𑀭𑁆𑀫𑁆𑀫𑀸, Gupta script: Śa-rvva-va-rmmā, complete form: Śarvavarman Indra Bhattarika) was the Maukhari ruler of the Kingdom of Kanyakubja from 560 to 575 CE.

Sharvavarman may have been the greatest of the Maukhari emperors, invading Magadha circa 575 CE and defeating the Later Guptas kings Damodaragupta and Mahasenagupta, which made him ruler of the entire Uttar Pradesh.

== Asirgarh and Nalanda seals ==
Sharvavarman was the son of Ishanavarman. He and the chronology of his family are rather well known, because of a copper seal he created: the Asirgarh seal. The seal reads:

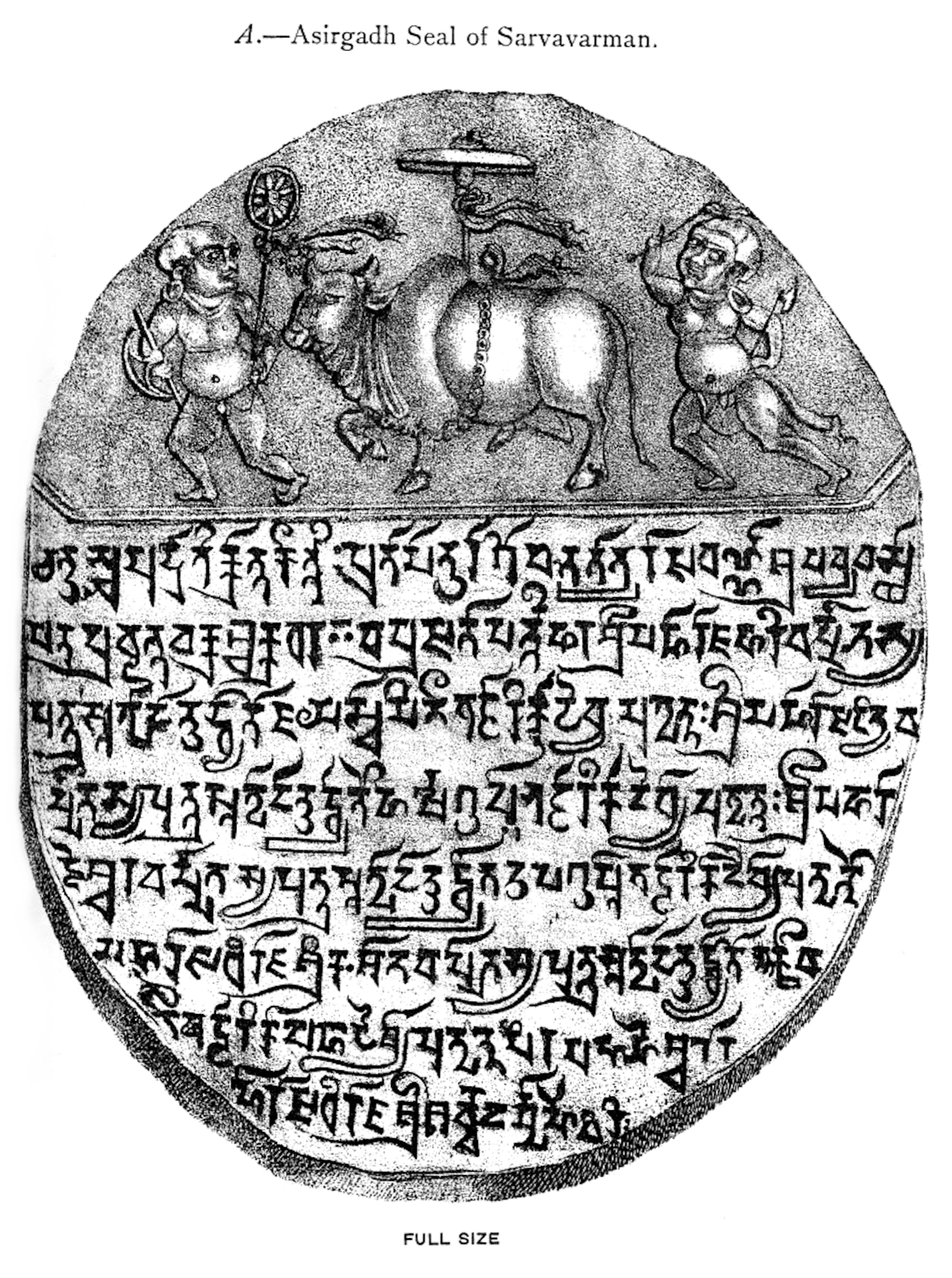
Asirgarh seal inscription of Sharvavarman

(There was) the illustrious Maharājā Harivarman, whose fame stretched out beyond the four oceans; who had other kings brought into subjection by (his) prowess and by affection (for him); who was like (the god) Chakradhara, in employing (his) sovereignty for regulating the different castes and stages of religious life; (and) who was the remover of the afflictions of (his) subjects. His son, who meditated on his feet, (was) the illustrious Mahârâja Âdityavarman, begotten on the Bhaṭṭârikâ and DêvîJayasvâminî. His son, who meditated on his feet, (was) the illustrious Mahârâja Îśvaravarman, begotten on the Bhaṭṭârikâ and Dêvî Harshaguptâ. His son, who meditated on his feet, (was) Mahârâjâdhirâja, the glorious Îśvaravarman, begotten on the Bhaṭṭârikâ and Dêvî Upaguptâ. His son, who meditates on his feet, (is) the most devout worshipper of (the god) Mahēśvara, the Mahârâjâdhirâja Śarvavarman, the Maukhari, begotten on the Bhaṭṭârikâ and Mahâdêvî Lakshamîvatî.

— Fleet, John Faithful. Inscriptions of the Early Gupta Kings and Their Successors. Calcutta: Superintendent of Govt. Printing, 1888.

Several other nearly identical seals of Sharvavarman were also discovered in Nalanda. The content of the seals is identical, but small variations indicate that they come from different molds.

== Reign ==
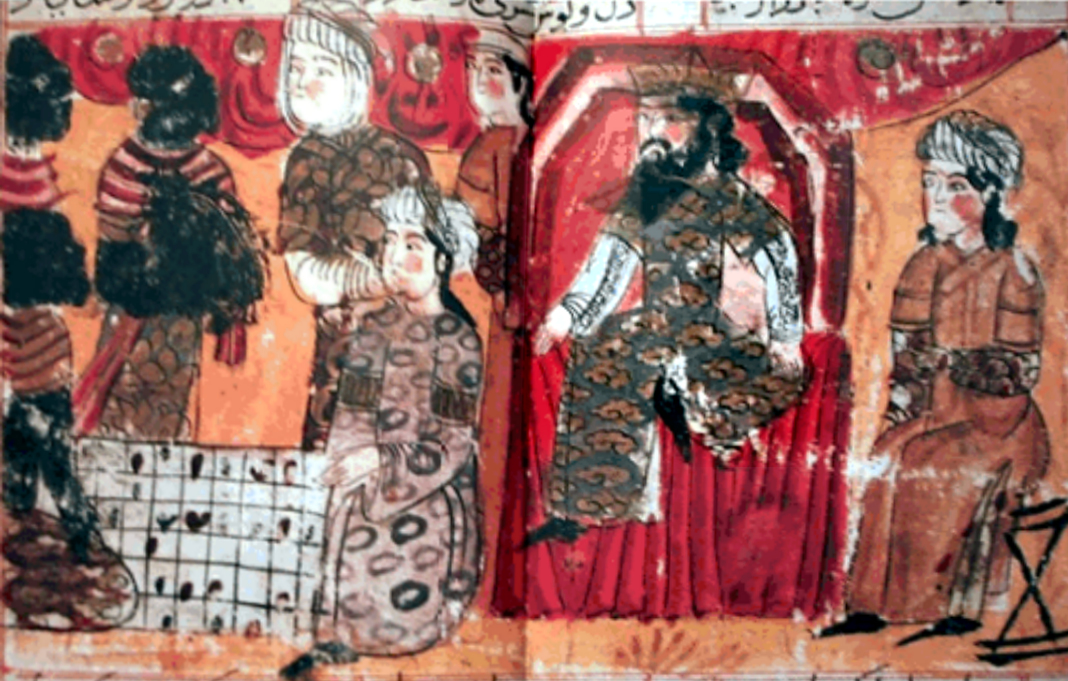
Sasanian Empire King Khosrow I sits before the chessboard, while his vizir and the Indian envoy of Kannauj are playing chess. Shahnama, 10th century CE.

Sharvarman was an important rival of the Late Guptas king Mahasenagupta (r. c. 562-601 CE) during the period 575-585 CE.

With the end of Hunnic power in India, new contacts were established between India and the Sasanian Empire. Intellectual games such as chess and backgammon demonstrated and celebrated the diplomatic relationship between Khosrow I and a "great king of India." The vizier of the Indian king invented chess as a cheerful, playful challenge to King Khosrow. It seems that the Indian ruler who sent the game of chess to Khosrow may have been Śarvavarman, between the beginning of Śarvavarman's reign in 560/565 and the end of Khosrow's reign in 579, When the game was sent to Iran it came with a letter which read: "As your name is the King of Kings, all your emperorship over us connotes that your wise men should be wiser than ours. Either you send us an explanation of this game of chess or send revenue and tribute us." Khosrow's grand vizier successfully solved the riddle and figured out how to play chess. In response the wise vizier created the game backgammon and sent it to the Indian court with the same message. The Indian king was not able to solve the riddle and was forced to pay tribute.

Sharvavarman was succeeded by his son Avantivarman, as indicated by the "Sohanag seal of Avantivarman".

== Works ==
=== Modern works ===
- Canepa, Matthew (2018). "Weh-andīōg-husraw (Rūmagān)". In Nicholson, Oliver (ed.). The Oxford Dictionary of Late Antiquity. Oxford: Oxford University Press. ISBN 978-0-19-866277-8.
