= Harivarman =

Founder of the Maukhari dynasty

- Maharaja, Jvalamukha

King of Kannauj
- Reign: 510 AD - ?
- Predecessor: None
- Successor: Adityavarman
- Spouse: Devi Jayasvamini
- Issue: Adityavarman
- Dynasty: Maukhari

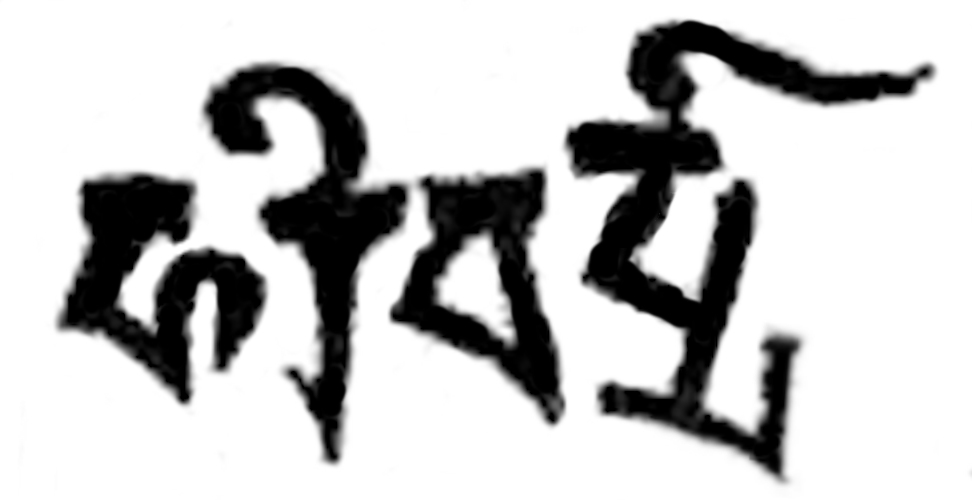
Hari-varman (Gupta script: Ha-ri-va-rmmā) was the first Maharaja of Kannauj and the founder of the Maukhari dynasty. He is the first ruler to be named in the known Maukhari records.

== Biography ==
Hari-varman was the founder of the Maukhari dynasty. He is the first ruler to be named in the known Maukhari records. He or one of his immediate ancestors probably moved westwards towards Kannauj during the decline of the Guptas from their original seat in Gaya where the original branch of the Maukharis were established known as the Maukharis of Gaya. He only bore the title of Maharaja, unlike the other Maukhari rulers who had pompous titles. The Haraha inscription gives him the epithet of Jvalamukha (fire-faced).

The Asirgadh seal of Sarva-varman Maukhari says that- (There was) the illustrious Mahârâja Harivarman, whose fame stretched out beyond the four oceans; who had other kings brought into subjection by (his) prowess and by affection (for him); who was like (the god) Chakradhara, in employing (his) sovereignty for regulating the different castes and stages of religious life; (and) who was the remover of the afflictions of (his) subjects. His son, who meditated on his feet, (was) the illustrious Mahârâja Âdityavarman, begotten on the Bhattârikâ and Dêvî Jayasvâminî.

== Succession ==
He was succeeded by his son Adityavarman onto the Maukhari throne.

== See also ==
- Maukhari dynasty
- Gupta Empire
- Vardhana dynasty
