= Gopika Cave Inscription =

Sanskrit inscription in the Barabar Caves, Bihar, India

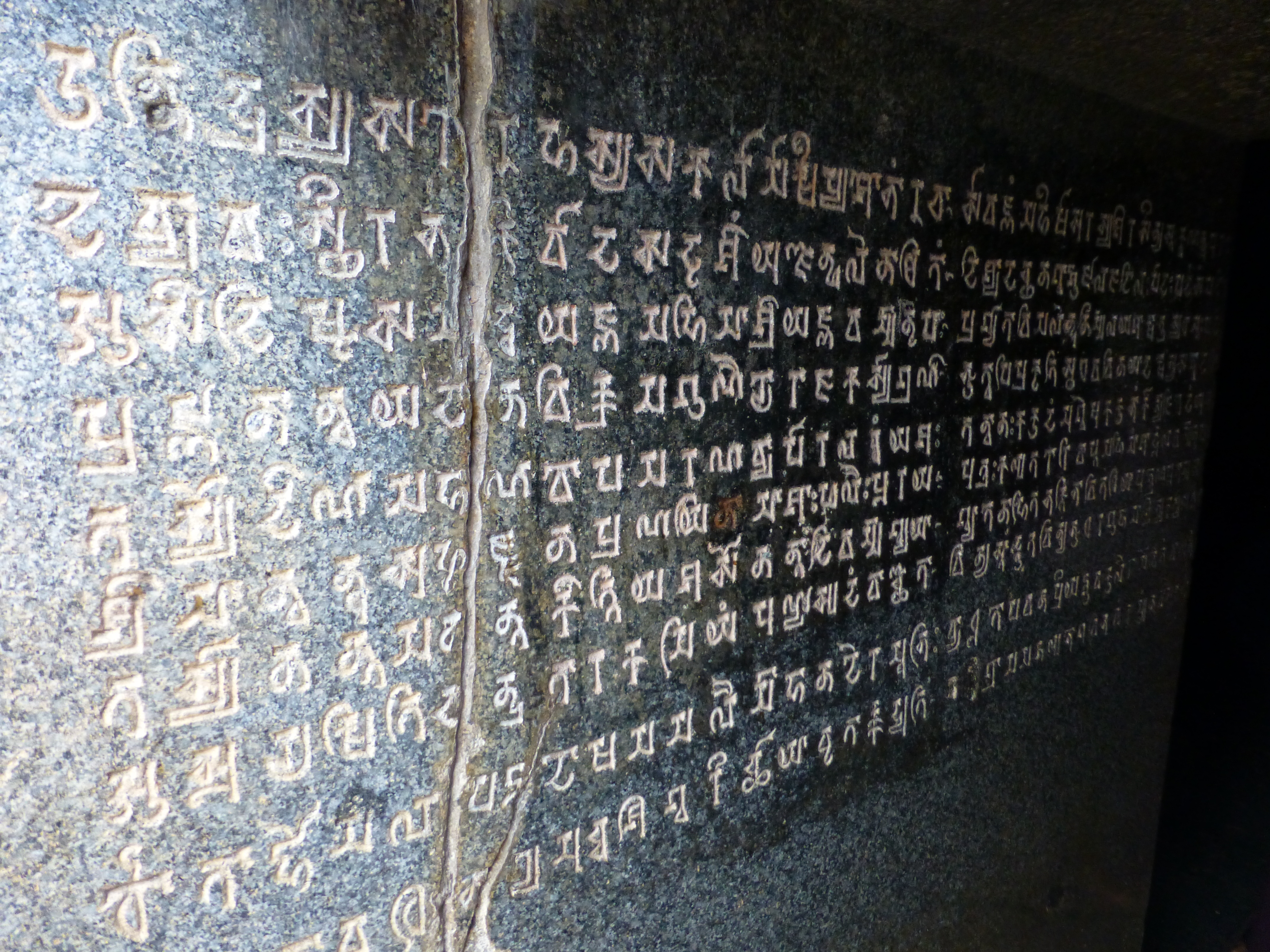
- Gopika Shaktism-related Sanskrit inscription
- Material: Cave rock
- Writing: Sanskrit, Gupta script
- Period/culture: Maukharis of Gaya
- Discovered: Gaya district, Bihar
- Place: Nagarjuni hill, Barabar Caves
- Present location: Gopika Cave

Location
- Nagarjuni-Barabar Caves (India)

The Gopika Cave Inscription, also called the Nagarjuni Hill Cave Inscription II of Anantavarman or formerly the Gaya inscription (referring to the nearby city of Gaya), is a 5th- or 6th-century CE Sanskrit inscription in Late Brahmi found in the Nagarjuni hill cave of the Barabar Caves group in Gaya district, Bihar, India.

The inscription is from the Shaktism tradition of Hinduism. It is notable for its dedicatory verse to Durga and for including the symbol for Om in the Gupta era. The inscription states that king Anantavarman is dedicating a statue of the goddess Katyayani (Durga-Mahishasuramardini) to the cave. The statue was missing when the caves came to the attention of archaeologists in the late 18th century.

== History ==
The Gopika Cave, also called Gopi ka Kubha, is one of three caves found in the Nagarjuni Hill cluster near the Barabar Caves in Bihar. The other two are Vapiyaka Cave and Vadathika Cave, also called Vapiya ka Kubha, and Vadathi ka Kubha respectively. These are near the Lomas Rishi Cave, the earliest known cave excavated in the 3rd century BCE and gifted by Ashoka to the Ajivikas monks. The Nangarjuni Caves were excavated in 214 BCE from a granite hill by the grandson of Ashoka. They are about 16 miles (26 km) north of Gaya.

According to Arthur Basham, the motifs carved in these groups of caves as well as inscriptions help establish that the Nagarjuni and Barabar Hill caves are from the 3rd century BCE. The original inhabitants of these were the Ajivikas, a non-Buddhist Indian religion that later became extinct. They abandoned the caves at some point. Then the Buddhists used these caves because there are the Bodhimula and Klesa-kantara inscriptions found here. Centuries later, a Hindu king named Anantavarman, of Maukhari dynasty, dedicated Hindu murti (images) of Vaishnavism, Shaivism and Shaktism in three of these caves in the 5th or 6th century. To mark the consecration, he left inscriptions in Sanskrit. These inscriptions are in then prevalent Gupta script and these have survived. After the 14th-century, the area was occupied by Muslims, as a number of tombs are nearby.

The Gopika Cave, literally "milkmaid's cave", is the largest of the three caves in the Nagarjuni hill. It is found on the southern side of the hill, with an entrance facing south. The other two caves (the Vadathika and Vapiyaka caves) are on the northern side of the same hill. The cave is approached by a flight of steps also carved in stone. When Alexander Cunningham visited the cave in the 1860s, he wrote, "the cave was concealed partly by a tree and by an Idgah wall" built by Muslims. The cave is about 46.5 feet (14.2 m) long by 19.16 feet (5.84 m) broad, with semi-circular ends. It has one entrance. Over the entrance is an inscription by the grandson of Ashoka, Dasaratha Maurya, dedicating the cave to the Ajivika ascetics, which dates the cave to the end of the 3rd-century BCE. This smaller inscription, as translated by James Prinsep starts with "The Gopi's Cave, an abode....", which gives the cave its name.

The Gopika Cave inscription of Anantavarman, inside the entrance corridor on the left handside, was first noticed in 1785 by J. H. Harrington, then reported to scholars in the 1788 issue of Asiatic Researches, Volume 1. Harrington stated that Muslims were living near these caves. He speculated that these once were "religious temples" because he saw three defaced images in them. The inscription, in Late Brahmi, was copied by Harrington and first deciphered in 1785 by Charles Wilkins, who published an essentially correct translation. Wilkins seems to have relied essentially on the similarities with later Brahmic scripts, such as the script of the Pala period and early forms of Devanagari. Wilkins also correctly identified the inscription to be related to Hinduism. Another translation was published by Kamalakanta Vidyalankar with James Prinsep in 1837. John Fleet published another revised translation in 1888.

== Description ==
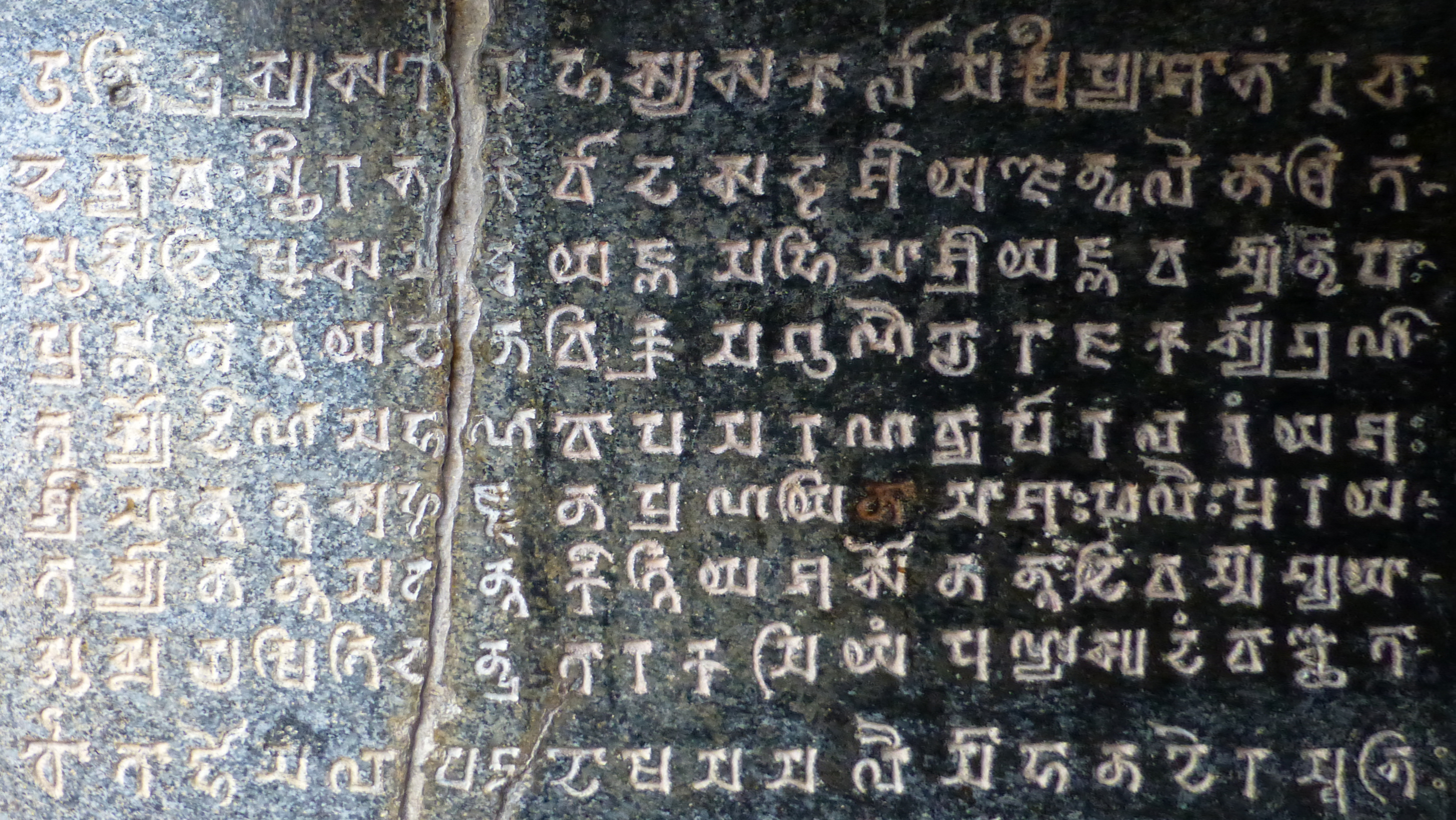
The inscription (left half).

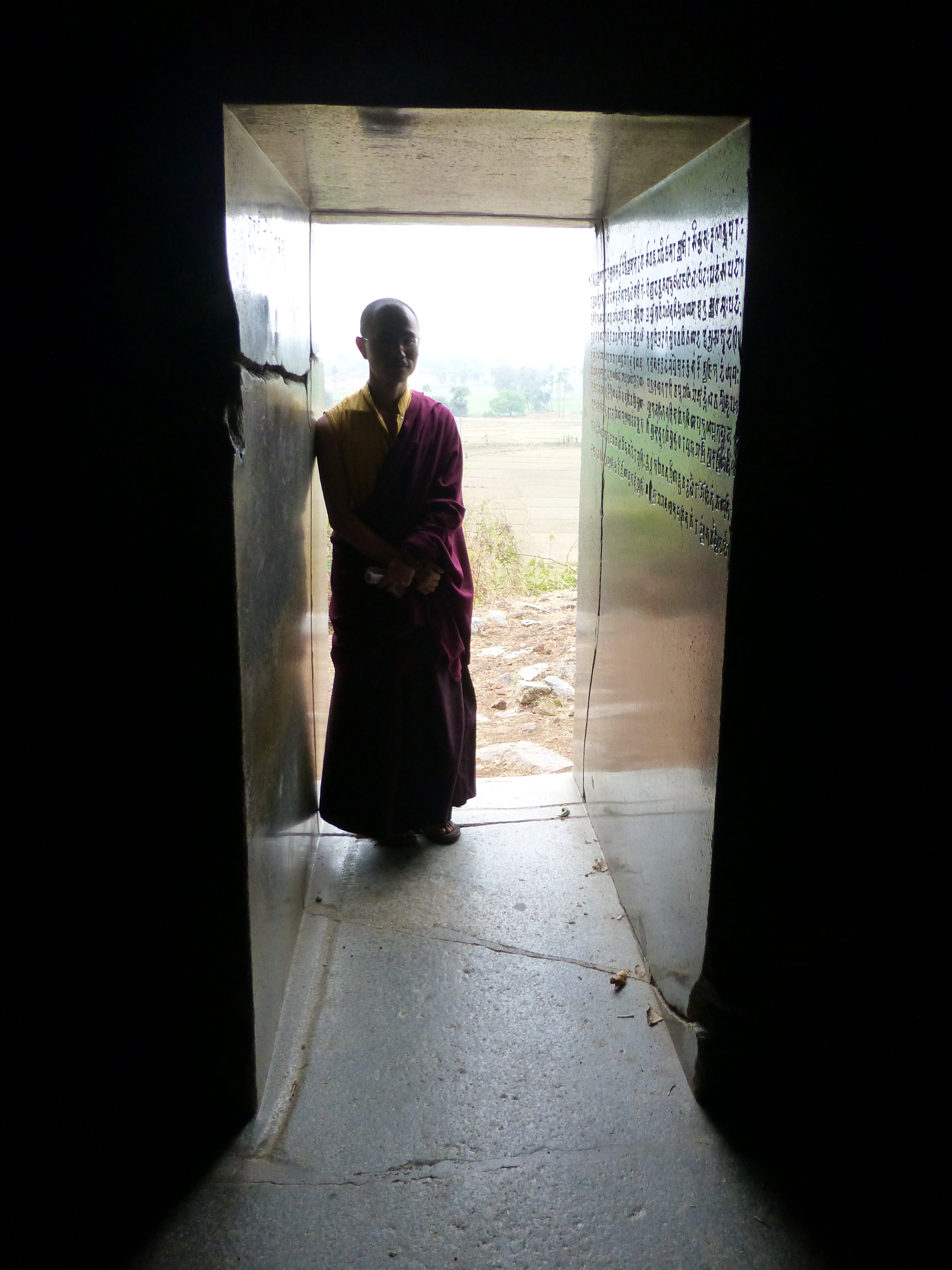
Entrance corridor of the Gopika cave, with the Gopika Cave Inscription of Anantavarman on the polished granite wall to the right.

The inscription is carved on the wall inside the entrance corridor, and is about 4.92 feet (1.50 m) by 2 feet (0.61 m) in surface. It has ten lines in Gupta script, with letters approximately 1 inch (25 mm) tall. It is one of the earliest Indian inscriptions that uses full matras (horizontal bar above each letter). The inscription is well preserved except for the name of the village gifted by the king for the maintenance of the Durga temple. The missing part is in the 10th line, which seems intentionally damaged by someone.

== Significance ==
The inscription is a Shakti inscription. It mentions that a Katyayani (synonym of Durga) statue was consecrated in this cave, as well as the donation of a village's revenue to the maintenance and operation of the Bhavani temple (synonym of Durga). (Note: Fleet states that the inscription may be considered to belong to Shaivism or Shaktism. It is dedicated to the wife of Shiva, using two of her common names – Katyayani and Bhavani.) The inscription starts with Om, just prior to the first line just like the Vadathika Cave Inscription, signifying its importance in 5th-century Hindu theology.

== See also ==
- Lakulisa Mathura Pillar Inscription
- Vadathika Cave Inscription
- Vasu Doorjamb Inscription
