= Maukharis of Gaya =

Branch of the Maukhari dynasty

Maukharis of Gaya Maukharis
- c. 4th century CE–c. early 6th century CE
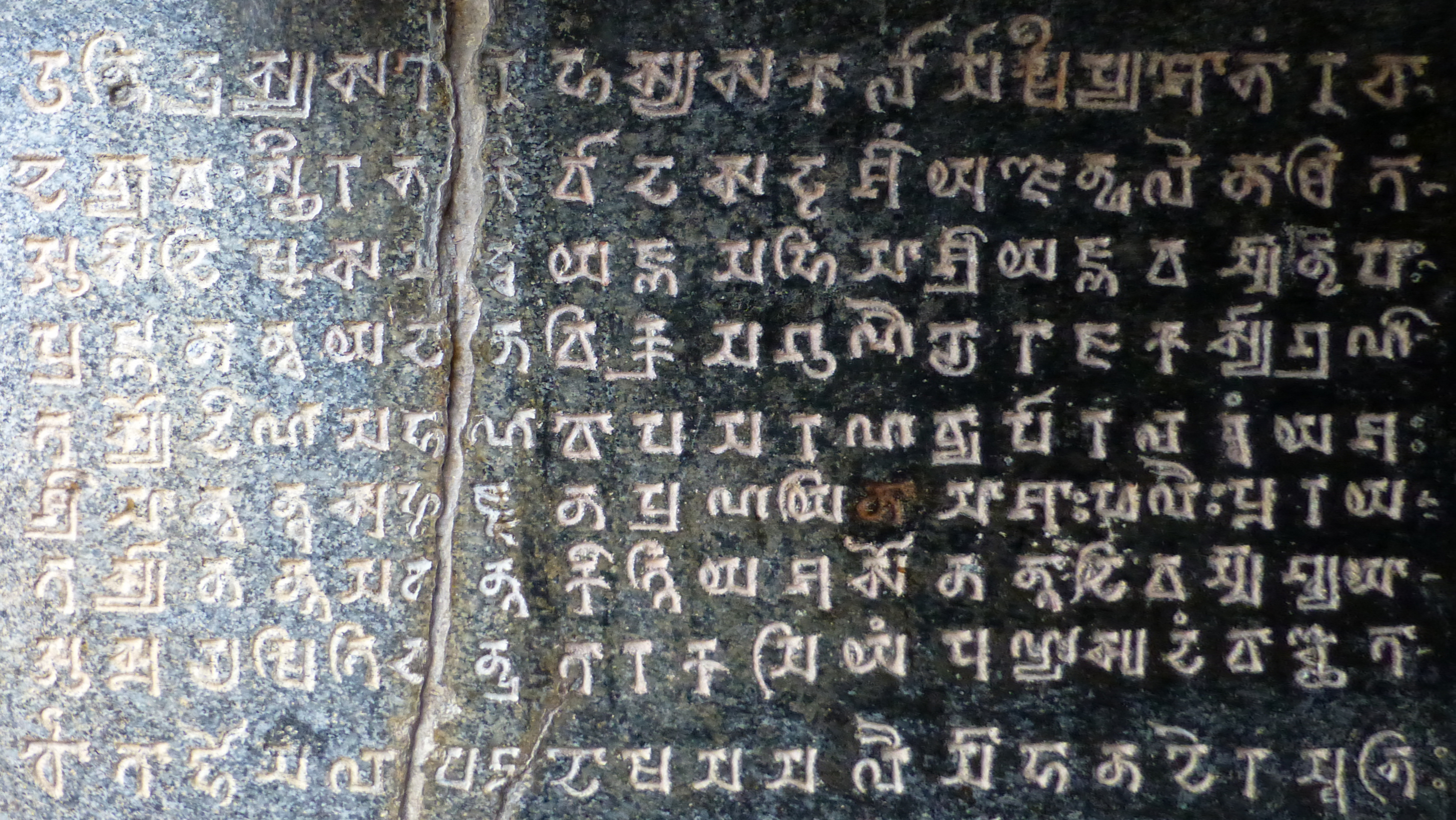
- The Gopika Cave Inscription of Anantavarman
- Religion: Hinduism; Buddhism
- Historical era: Medieval India
  - Established: c. 4th century CE
  - Disestablished: c. early 6th century CE
Preceded by	Succeeded by
Gupta Empire	Later Gupta dynasty; Maukharis of Kannauj

The Maukharis of Gaya were a branch of the Maukhari dynasty that ruled the Magadha region.they have been dated from the fifth to the early sixth centuries.

== History ==
The earliest reference to Maukharis in the region is an inscription from the Mauryan period written in Brahimi on a clay seal dating back to the third-century BCE and contains the term Mokhalinām. The term, Maukhari, is likely a patronymic meaning “descendants of Mukhara” with Mukhara being the common ancestor of all branches of the Maukharis. Based on this, Gaya was likely the original seat of the Maukharis prior to the westward migration of a separate branch which travelled to Kannauj under Harivarman. The Gaya branch likely provided assistance to the Kannauj branch in establishing power. Another later set of three inscriptions from Anantavarman located in the Barabar Caves attest to the continued presence of Maukharis in Magadha. They likely ruled as feudatories, probably that of the Later Guptas. The known rulers include:

- Nrpa Shri Yajnavarman
- Nrpa Samantachudamani Shri Shardulavarman
- Anantavarman

In some of the Barabar Caves inscriptions, the words referring to the Ajivikas appear to have been defaced, although the rest of the text appears intact. E. Hultzsch theorised that the defacement took place when the Maukhari ruler Ananta-varman installed Hindu images at the Caves. However, Basham dismisses this theory, noting that there is little evidence to support this view and the only cave in which the word Ajivikehi remains intact is among the three caves where Ananta-varman installed a Hindu image. According to Basham, since the defacement is selective, it must have taken place when the Brahmi script had still not been forgotten, likely some time before the 5th century CE.

=== Yajnavarman ===
The first recorded member of this dynasty, Yajnavarman, was likely descended from local feudatories of the Gupta Empire and in the wake of their disintegration, emerged as the rulers of the region around Gaya. There is no evidence of him carrying out any conquests or war-like activities.

=== Shardulavarman ===
Shardulavarman was the son of Yajnavarman and the inscriptions describe him as "Samanta-cudamani" meaning the "best amongst chieftains". He was noted as having won great fame in battle and worked to raise the status of the family by expanding their territory. These may be connected with the invasions of the Alchon Huns.

=== Anantavarman ===
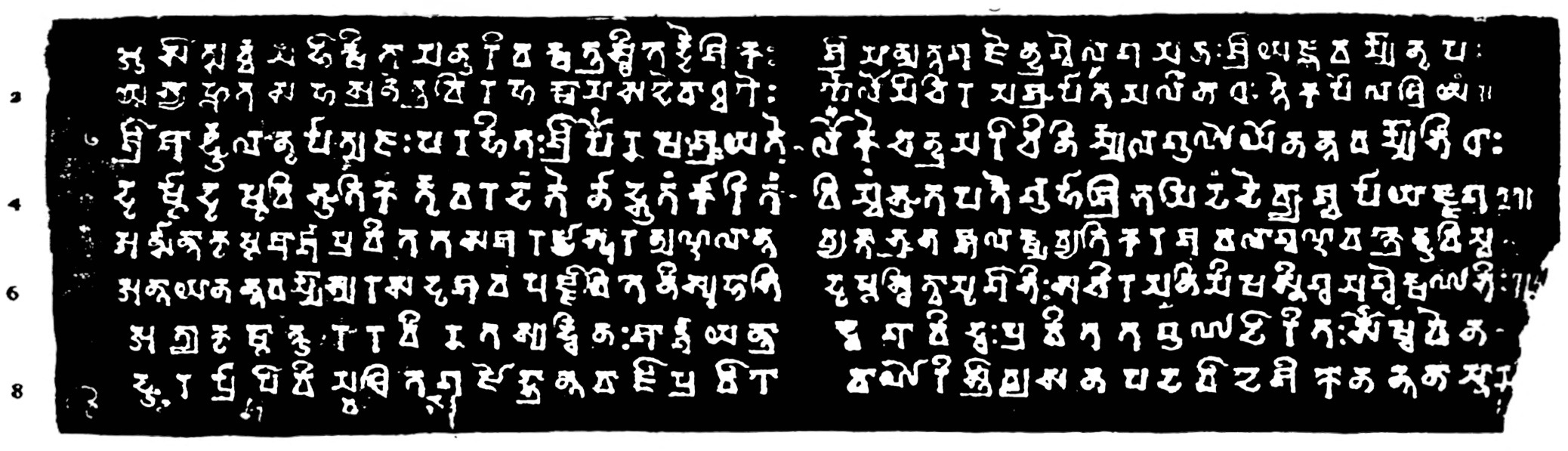
5th or 6th century Vadathika Cave Inscription of Anantavarman

Under Anantavarman, the prestige of the family may have been reduced due to the growing power of the Later Gupta dynasty as he is not referred to by any title or honorific. They were probably vassalised during the reign of Krishnagupta (Kṛṣṇagupta) who ruled the region from c. 490-505 CE. Instead, the activities of the Maukharis switched to a religious nature and the activities of Anantavarman provide the first evidence of Vishnu worship in the Magadha region. It was during this time that a member of the family, Harivarman instead travelled westwards to carve out his own fortune leading to the formation of the Maukharis of Kannauj. This branch rose to prominence during the reign of Ishanavarman.

== Sources ==
- Thaplyal, Kiran Kumar (1985). Inscriptions of the Maukharīs, Later Guptas, Puṣpabhūtis, and Yaśovarman of Kanauj. Indian Council of Historical Research.
- Basham, A.L. (1951). History and Doctrines of the Ājīvikas. London: Luzac. Reprinted by Moltilal Banarsidass in 1981
