= Vadathika Cave Inscription =

Hill cave in Gaya district

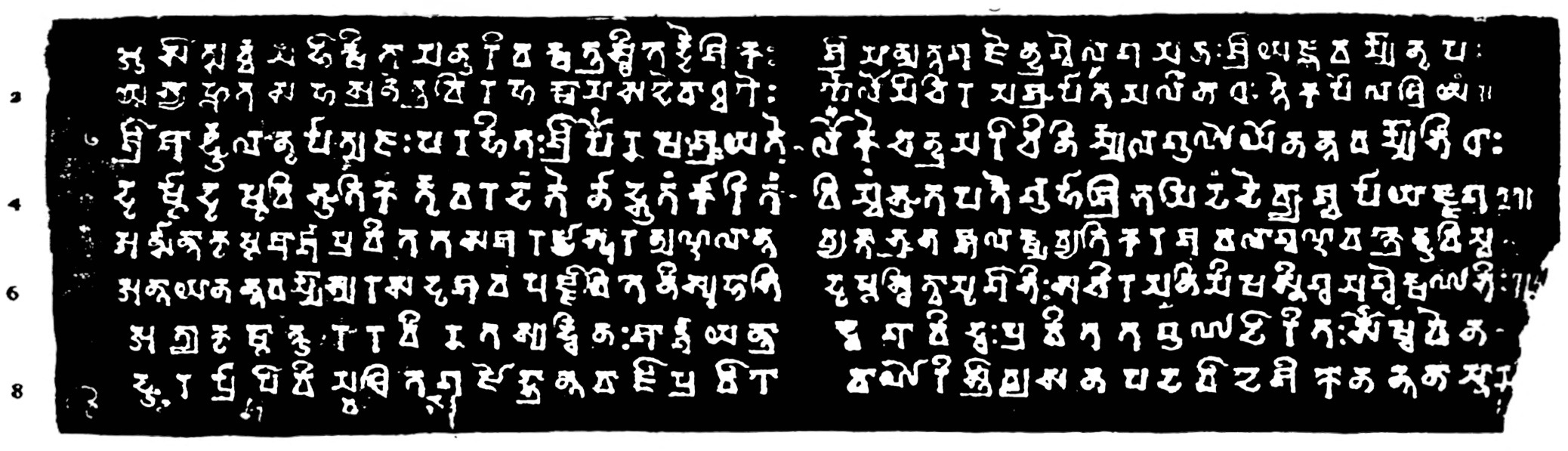
- Vadathika Shaivism-related Sanskrit inscription (Fleet version)
- Material: Cave wall
- Writing: Sanskrit, Gupta script
- Created: 5th or 6th century
- Period/culture: Maukharis of Gaya
- Discovered: Gaya district, Bihar
- Place: Nagarjuni hill, Barabar Caves
- Present location: Vadathika Cave

Location
- Nagarjuni-Barabar Caves (India)

The Vadathika Cave Inscription, also called the Nagarjuni Hill Cave Inscription of Anantavarman, is a 5th- or 6th-century CE Sanskrit inscriptions in Gupta script found in the Nagarjuni hill cave of the Barabar Caves group in Gaya district Bihar. The inscription is notable for including symbol for Om in Gupta era. It marks the dedication of the cave to a statue of Bhutapati (Shiva) and Devi (Parvati). The statue was likely of Ardhanarishvara that was missing when the caves came to the attention of archaeologists in the 18th-century.

== History ==
The Vadathika Cave, also called Vadathi ka Kubha, is one of three caves found in the Nagarjuni Hill cluster near the Barabar Caves in Bihar. The other two are Vapiyaka Cave and Gopika Cave, also called Vapiya ka Kubha and Gopi ka Kubha, respectively. These are near the Lomas Rishi Cave, the earliest known cave excavated in the 3rd century BCE and gifted by Ashoka to the Ajivikas monks. The Nagarjuni Caves were excavated in 214 BCE from a granite hill by the grandson of Ashoka. They are about 16 miles (26 km) north of Gaya.

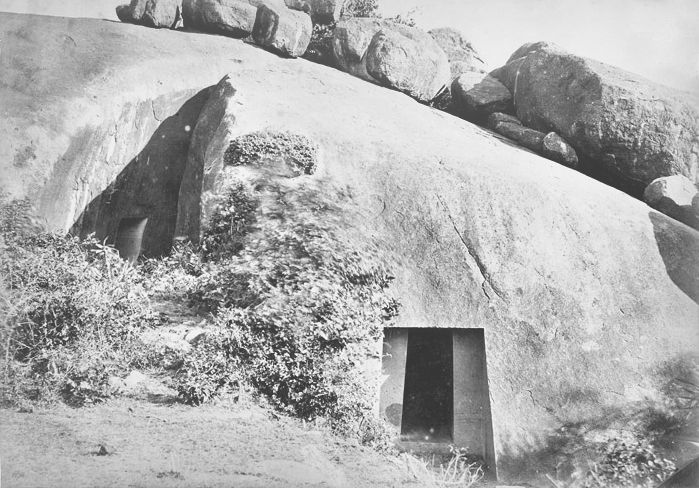
The Vadathika cave is the one on the left, with the entrance in the recess. Barabar Caves.

According to Arthur Basham, the motifs carved in these groups of caves as well as inscriptions help establish that the Nagarjuni and Barabar Hill caves are from the 3rd century BCE. The original inhabitants of these were the Ajivikas, a non-Buddhist Indian religion that later became extinct. They abandoned the caves at some point. Then the Buddhists used these caves because there are the Bodhimula and Klesa-kantara inscriptions found here. Centuries later, a Hindu king named Anantavarman, of Maukhari dynasty, dedicated Hindu murti (images) of Vaishnavism, Shaivism and Shaktism in three of these caves in the 5th or 6th century. To mark the consecration, he left inscriptions in Sanskrit. These inscriptions are in then prevalent Gupta script and these have survived. After the 14th-century, the area was occupied by Muslims, as a number of tombs are nearby.

The Vadathika Cave inscription was first noticed in 1785 by J. H. Harrington, then reported to scholars in the 1790 issue of Asiatic Researches, Volume 2. It is found on the northern side of the hill, immediately next to the Vapiyaka Cave and its Vapi (water tank). The cave has several inscriptions, including one from the 3rd-century BCE. It starts by stating the name of the cave to be Vadathi, the source of this cave's historic name and the inscription. The inscription as copied by Harrington was first translated by Charles Wilkins. In 1847, Markham Kittoe made a new eye-copy and published it with Rajendralal Mitra's new translation. John Fleet published another revised translation in 1888.

== Description ==
The inscription is carved in granite over about a 4.25 feet (1.30 m) by 1.5 feet (0.46 m) surface. It has eight lines in Gupta script, with letters approximately 1 inch (25 mm) tall. It is one of the earliest Indian inscriptions that uses full matras (horizontal bar above each letter).

=== Inscription, edited by Fleet ===
1. Om āsīt sarvvamahīkṣitā manur iva kṣattrasthiter ddeśikaḥ_śrīmān mattagajendrakhelagamanaḥ śrīyajñavarmmā nṛpaḥ |
2. yasyāhūtasahasranettravirahakṣāmā sadaivādhvaraiḥ_paulomī ciram aśrupātamalināṃ dhatte kapolaśriyaṃ ||

3. śrīśārdūlanṛpātmajaḥ parahitaḥ śrīpauruṣaḥ śrūyate|loke candramarīcinirmmalaguṇo yo nantavarmmābhidhaḥ |
4. dṛṣṭādṛṣṭavibhūti kartṛvaradaṃ tenādbhutaṃ kāritaṃ|vimvaṃ bhūtapater guhāśritam idaṃ devyāś ca pāyāj jagaT ||

5. ansāntākṛṣṭaśārṅgapravitatasaśarajyāsphuranmaṇḍalānta_vyaktabhrūbhaṅgalakṣmavyatikaraśavalākhaṇḍavaktrenduvimva |
6. antāyānantavarmmā smarasadṛśavapur jjīvite nispṛhābhiḥ_dṛṣṭa sthitvā mṛgībhiḥ suciram animiśasnigdhamugdhekṣaṇābhi ||

7. atyākṛṣṭāt kuraravirutasparddhinaḥ śārṅgayantrā_2_dvegāviddhaḥ pravitataguṇād īritaḥ sauṣṭhavena |
8. dūraprāpī vimathitagajodbhrāntavājī pravīro_2_vāṇo ristrīvyasanapadavīdeśiko nantanāmna ||

– Vadathika Cave Inscription

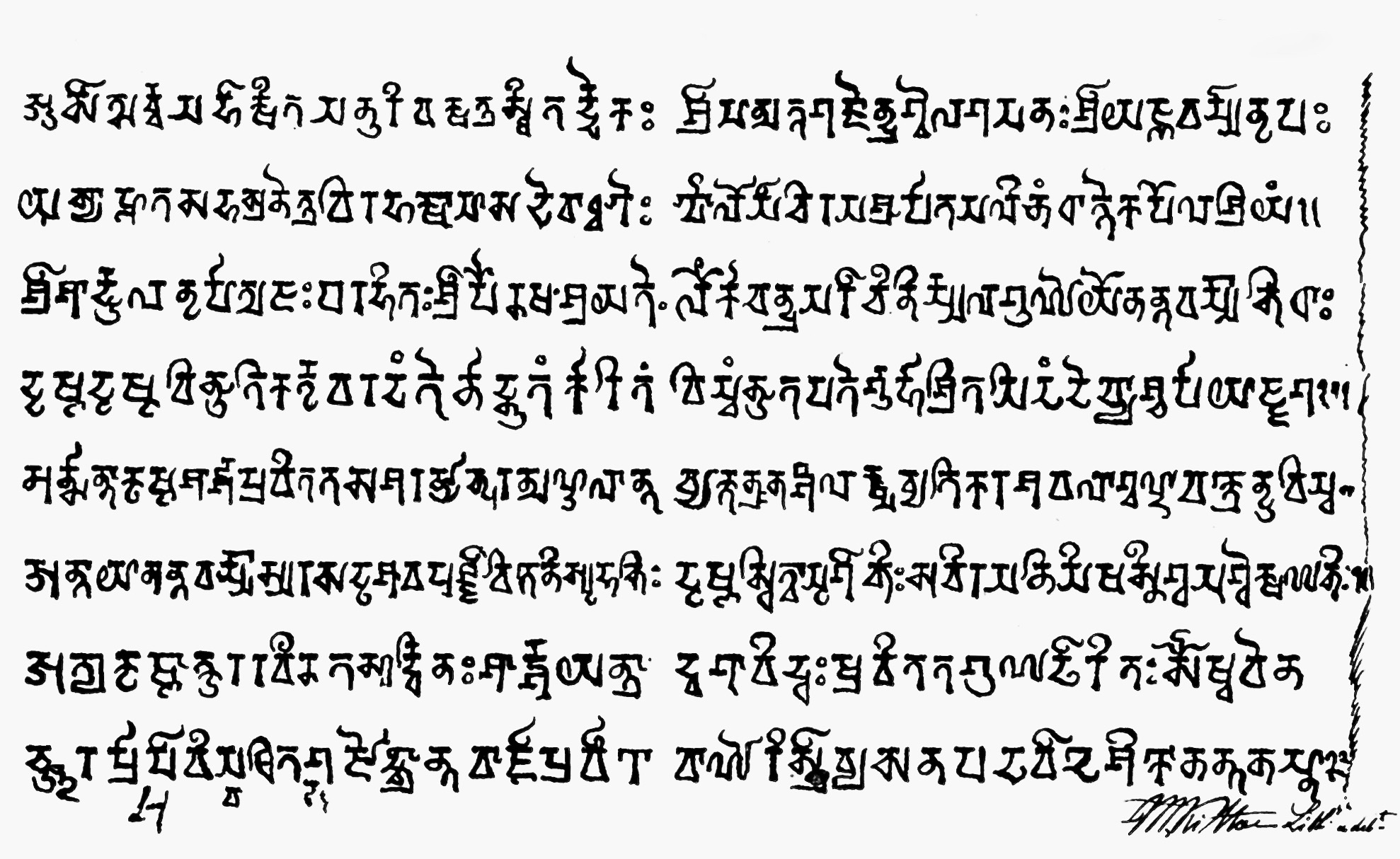
Vadathika Cave Inscription, Markham Kittoe version

=== Translation by Fleet ===
John Fleet translated it as,

Om! There was a glorious king, the illustrious Yajnavarman, who, as if he were Anu, instructed all rulers of the earth in the duty of those who belong to the warrior caste; whose gait was like the play of a rutting elephant; (and) through whose sacrifices (the goddess) Paulomi, always emaciated by separation from (the god Indra) who has a thousand eyes, invoked (by this king so constantly as to be perpetually absent from her), has had the beauty of (her) cheeks for a long time sullied by the falling of tears.

He, the son of the illustrious king Sardula, who has the name of Anantavarman; who is reputed in the world to be benevolent to others, (and) to be possessed of fortune and manliness, (and) to be full of virtues that are as spotless as the rays of the moon, by him was caused to be made this wondrous image, placed in (this) cave, of (the god) Bhutapati (Note: Bhutapati is a synonym of Shiva.) and (the goddess) Devi, which is possessed of excellencies (of workmanship) some of them (previously) beheld (in other images) but others not so; (and) which confers boons upon the maker (if it). May it protect the world!

Having the surface of the full-moon that is (his) face made grey through being scattered over with spots that are (his) frowns displayed at the ends of the bent arc, glistening with (its) string pulled tight and fitted with an arrow, of the bow drawn up to the extremities of (his) shoulders, Anantavarman, whose body is like (that of) (the god) Smara, having stood, gazed upon for a very long time by the does, indifferent to life, whose moist and tender eyes omit to blink (through the intentness with which they regard him), (lives only) for (the purpose of dealing out) death. The far reaching (and) powerful arrow, scattering the elephants and driving horses wild with fear, of him who has the name of Ananta, impelled with speed (and) skilfully discharged from the machine of (his) bow, fitted with a well-stretched string, that is drawn very tight (and) rivals the screams of an osprey (with the noise of its twanging), teaches to the wives of (his) enemies the condition of the sorrows (of widowhood).

== Significance ==
The inscription is a Shaiva inscription, one that mentions one statue (vimvaṃ, bimba) depicting Shiva and Parvati, which states Fleet likely means it was an Ardhanarishvara image, with one half as male Shiva and the other half as female Parvati. The inscription starts with Om, just prior to the first line, signifying its importance in 5th-century Hindu theology.

Markham Kittoe, who visited the cave before 1847, stated that there were sculpture fragments scattered in the cave in a style that reminded him of early style. He wrote, "there must have been a very handsome temple here of early date".

== See also ==
- Lakulisa Mathura Pillar Inscription
- Gopika Cave Inscription
- Vasu Doorjamb Inscription
