= Matras =

Matras is a surname. Notable people with the surname include:

- Agnieszka Matras-Clement (born 1982), Polish and Canadian chess player
- Christian Matras (poet) (1900–1988), Faroese poet
- Christian Matras (cinematographer) (1903–1977), French cinematographer
- Fabien Matras (born 1984), French politician
- Klæmint Matras (born 1981), Faroese footballer
- Maria Wankijf (née Matras, died after 1705), Swedish printer and publisher
- Mateusz Matras (born 1991), Polish footballer
- Yaron Matras (born 1963), linguist

== See also ==
- Matra (disambiguation)
- Mātras, a village in Ēdole Parish, Latvia
- Teitur Matras Gestsson (born 1992), Faroese footballer
- Matrass, a glass vessel
