= Devagupta =

King of Malwa from 601 to 606

King of Malwa
- Reign: 601–606
- Predecessor: Mahasenagupta
- Successor: Kingdom abolished Conquered by Rajyavardhana of Kannauj
- Died: 606
- House: Later Gupta dynasty
- Father: Mahasenagupta

Devagupta was the king of Malwa from 601 to 606 AD. He ruled the territories which had initially been the western part of the erstwhile Later Guptas prior to the conquest of its eastern part by the Kingdom of Kannauj. He was the eldest son of Mahasenagupta and a member of the Later Gupta dynasty. Devagupta is known for having engineered a Malwa–Gauda alliance with Shashanka of Gauda to counter the Thanesar–Kannauj alliance. The alliance was initially successful, and Devagupta's forces reached Kannauj and killed the king of Kannauj. However, the king of Thanesar defeated Malwa and killed Devagupta, but was himself killed in the war with Gauda. Harsha succeeded him and repelled the Gauda invasion.

Following the defeat of Devagupta, the other two sons of Mahasenagupta were sent to Kannauj and Harsha restored Madhavagupta to the throne of the Kingdom of Kannauj ^{[or Malwa?]} as a vassal.

== Background ==
The Gupta Empire had greatly reduced in power in the sixth century. The Kingdom of Kannauj, initially a vassal of the empire, had declared its independence and frequently warred with the empire. In 575 AD, Sharvavarman of Kannauj conquered the eastern half of the empire that comprised the core of the empire. Mahasenagupta escaped to the eastern remaining portion of the empire in Malwa and established the rump state of the Kingdom of Malwa.

He was succeeded by his son Devagupta in 601 AD. Devagupta was wary of the new Thanesar–Kannauj alliance to the north of kingdom and sought to destroy it. He allied with Shashanka of Gauda and created the Malwa–Gauda alliance to counter the Thanesar–Kannauj alliance.

== Fall of Malwa ==
The alliance was initially successful, and Devagupta's forces reached Kannauj and killed King Grahavarman of Kannauj. However, the king of Thanesar Rajyavardhana defeated Malwa and killed Devagupta, but was himself killed in the war with Gauda. Harsha succeeded him and repelled the invasion by Gauda, finally winning the war.
