= Agnieszka Matras-Clement =

Polish chess player (born 1982)

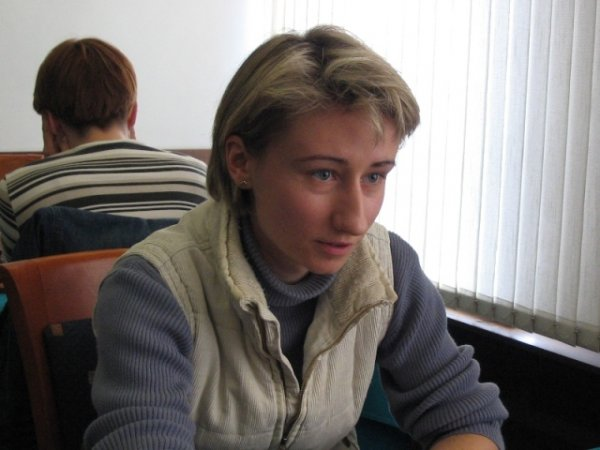
- Agnieszka Matras in 2005

Personal information
- Born: 5 December 1982 (age 43) Wodzisław Śląski, Poland

Chess career
- Country: Poland (until 2016); Canada (since 2016)
- Title: Woman International Master (2000)
- FIDE rating: 2297 (December 2019)
- Peak rating: 2305 (January 2012)

Agnieszka Barbara Matras-Clement (née Matras; born 5 December 1982) is a Polish and Canadian (from 2016) chess Woman International Master (WIM) (2000).

== Biography ==
Agnieszka Matras is a multiple medalist of the Polish Youth Chess Championships: three times gold (Trzebinia 1999 - U20 girl's age group, Wisła 2000 - U18 girl's age group, Trzebinia 2002 - U20 girl's age group), silver (Brzeg Dolny 2001 - U20 girl's age group) and twice bronze (Babimost 1997 - U20 girl's age group, Trzebinia 1998 - U20 girl's age group). In addition, in 1999 in Straszecin she won the gold medal, and in 2000 in Wisła - the silver medal of the Polish Youth Team Chess Championships (in the colors of the MKSzach Rybnik club). She represented Poland many times at the World Youth Chess Championships: in 1998 U16 girl's age group in Oropesa del Mar, in 1999 U20 girl's age group in Yerevan, in 2000 - U18 girl's age group in Oropesa del Mar, in 2002 - U20 girl's age group in Goa. In 1998, she shared 1st–2nd place in the junior chess tournament in Malmö, and in 2002 she shared 3rd in the Open tournament in Stockholm. The following year she won the Open C tournament (ladies tournament) in Polanica-Zdrój.

From 2000 to 2013 Agnieszka Matras nine times participated in Polish Women's Chess Championship finals, the best result achieved in 2005 in Suwałki, where she took 5th place. In the colors of the MKSz Rybnik chess club in 2008 and 2009, she won the titles of Polish Women's Team Chess Championship twice. She is also a four-time medalist of Polish Blitz Chess Team Championship: gold (2008), twice silver (2006, 2009) and bronze (2007). In 2011 Agnieszka Matras-Clement won bronze medal in the Polish Blitz Chess Championship.

Agnieszka Matras's peak rating is 2305, achieved in December 2012; she was ranked 7th among Polish female chess players in this month.
