= Matrass =

Laboratory glassware

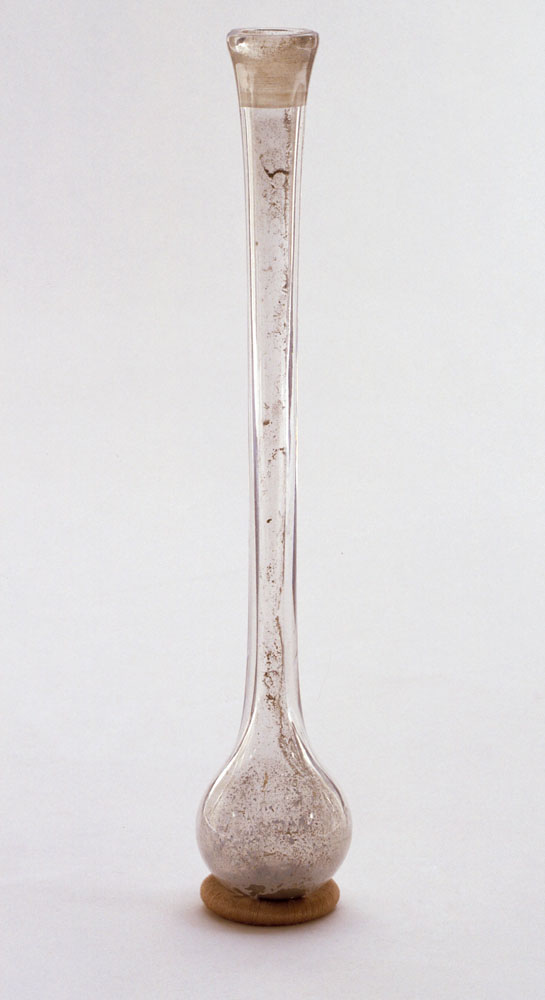
A matrass held in Museo Galileo in Florence

A matrass (mod. Latin matracium), also known as a bolthead, is a glass vessel with a round or oval body and a long narrow neck, used in chemistry as a digester or distiller. The Florence flask is frequently used for this purpose. The word is possibly identical with the old name matrass (Fr. materas, matelas), meaning the bolt or quarrel of a crossbow. If so, some identity of shape is the reason for the application of the word. Another connection is suggested with the Arabic matra, a leather bottle.

== See also ==
- Laboratory flask
