= Ghosrawan =

- Village
- Location in Bihar, India Ghosrawan (India)
- Coordinates: 25.091°N 85.578°E
- Country: India
- State: Bihar
- Region: Magadha
- Division: Patna
- District: Nalanda
- Block: Giriyak
- Time zone: UTC+5:30 (IST)
- PIN: 803115

Ghosrawan is a village located in Giriyak block in the district of Nalanda in Bihar, India.

== Location ==
It is located 16 km towards south from district headquarters Bihar Sharif, 6 km from Giriyak, and 86 km from state capital Patna.

Darweshpura (3 km), Maira Barith (4 km), Pawa (4 km), Tetrawan (4 km), Pokharpur (5 km) are the nearby villages to Ghosrawan. Warisaliganj, Bihar Sharif, Silao, Rajgir are the nearby cities to Ghosrawan.

Ghosrawan is surrounded by Giriyak block towards east, Bihar Sharif block towards north, Warisaliganj block towards south, Silao block towards west. This place is at the border of the Nalanda district and Nawada district.

== Places ==
Ghosrawan is in close proximity to the ancient sites of Pavapuri and Nalanda. It is notable for its Buddhist ruins including a Buddhist stone inscription. An Aashapuri Maharani temple is also nearby. This temple is one of the most famous temples in that locality. The temple is beside the main road and at the start of the village, coming from west side.

== Politics in Ghosrawan ==
JD(U), BJP, RJD and Lok Janshakti Party are the major political parties in this area.

== How to reach Ghosrawan ==
=== By Rail ===
Pawapuri Railway Station is the closest railway stations to Ghosrawan. Bihar Sharif Junction Railway Station (near Bihar Sharif), Nawadah Railway Station (near Nawada), Tungi Halt Railway Station (near Bihar Sharif) are other railway stations reachable from nearby towns.

=== By Road ===
Bihar Sharif, Nawada are the nearby by towns to Ghosrawan having road connectivity.
