= Ishanavarman =

Maharajadhiraja of Kankaykubja from 550 to 660

- Maharajadhiraja
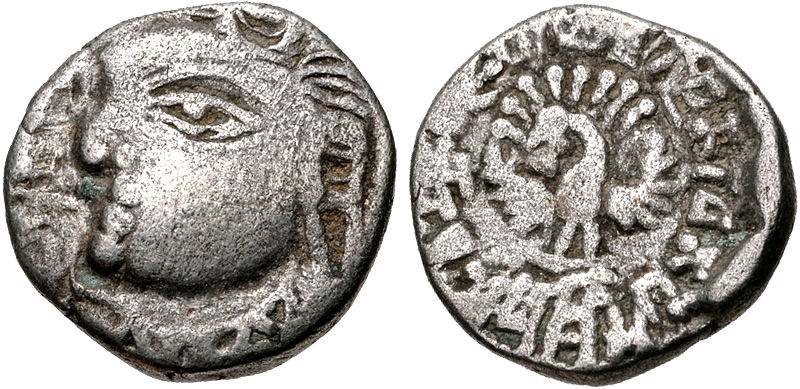
- Coin of King Iśanavarman of the Maukhari of Kanyakubja

Maharajadhiraja of Kanyakubja
- Reign: c. 550–560
- Predecessor: Ishvara-varman
- Successor: Sharva-varman
- Spouse: Mahadevi Lakshmivati
- Issue: Sharva-varman, Suryavarman
- Dynasty: Maukhari
- Father: Ishvara-varman

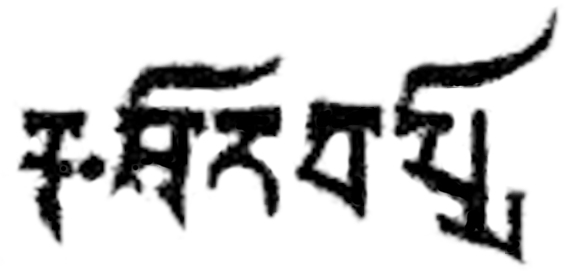
Iśanavarman (Gupta script: , Ī-śā-na-va-rmmā) was the first independent Maukhari king of Kannauj. He was a very powerful king, and adopted the title of Maharajadhiraja.

== Early life ==
Ishanavarman was the son of the powerful Maukhari ruler Ishvara-varman (Iśvaravarman) and his queen Devi Upagupta. He was well known for his skill as an archer, particularly against enemy cavalry and elephants. Ishanavarman ascended the throne in 550 CE or 554 CE, probably after his father's death.

== Reign ==
The early Maukhari rulers had been on very friendly terms with the Later Guptas, and even conducted marriage alliances between themselves. An example is Ishanavarman's own mother Devi Upagupta, who was married to Ishvara-varman. However, things changed with time under him. Under Ishanavarman, the Maukharis began to assert their independence from the Later Guptas. Ishanavarman became hostile to the former overlords of the Maukharis, in order to conquer Magadha.

Ishanavarman revived the Maukhari power, as some prestige was lost during the last years of his father's reign. Ishanavarman's inscriptions describe him as a valiant warrior whose hands were hardened and callused by the repeated use of the bow on the battlefield. His armies are stated to be vast and continuously on the march. The Haraha inscription of Śarva-varman mentions that Ishanavarman inflicted defeat upon the Andhras, Sulikas, and checked the Gaudas. The Andhra country was then ruled by the Vishnukundinas. The Vishnukundina king defeated must have been Indravarman or Vikramendravarman I.

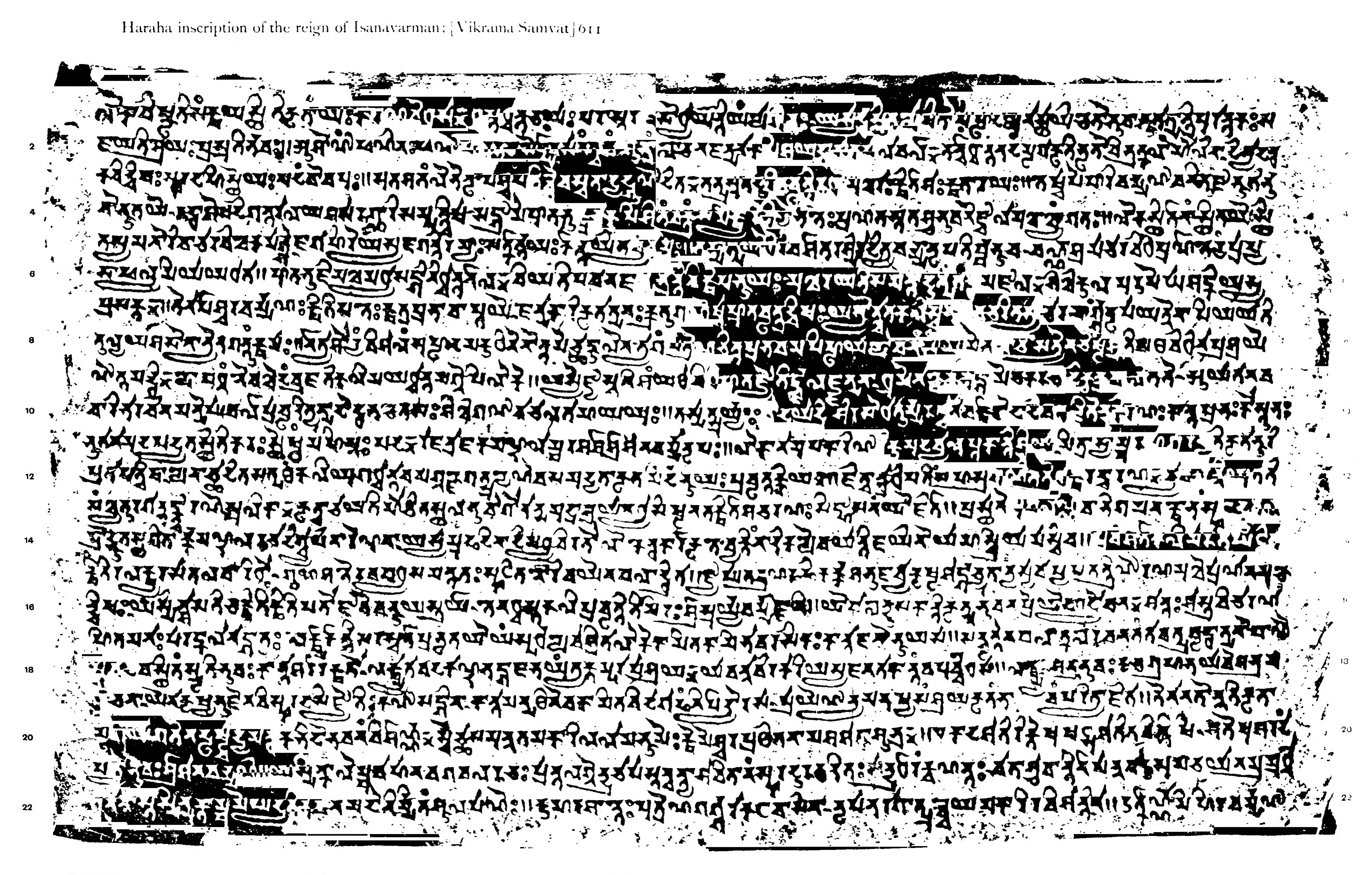
The Haraha inscription of Isanavarman, discovered near the village of Harara in the Barabanki district, Uttar Pradesh. The inscription, dated to Vikrama Samvat 610 (ie 554 CE), records the genealogy of the Maukharis.

Ishanavarman in all probability would have taken much pains to reorganize the Maukhari army and make it strong and worthy. His successful campaigns against foes known for their powerful corps - the Andhras for their elephants and the Sulikas for their cavalry - attest to this fact. The Maukharis developed into a prominent and imperial power during his reign. He was also the first Maukhari ruler to adopt the title of Maharajadhiraja.

The Mahakuta Pillar inscription claims that Chalukya Kirtivarman I defeated the rulers of Vanga, Anga, Kalinga, Vattura, Magadha, Madraka, etc. In their northwards expansion, the Chalukyas probably came into conflict with Ishanavarman and suffered a defeat at his hands.

The victories of Ishanavarman increased the political power of the Maukharis and alarmed the Later Gupta king Kumaragupta III who defeated Ishanavarman but could not completely crush him.

== Personal life ==
He was married to Mahadevi Lakshmivati, and had two children- Sarvavarman and Suryavarman.

== Succession ==
Ishanavarman was succeeded by his eldest son Sharvavarman in 560.
