= Northwest India =

Group of Indian states

Northwest India Northwestern India
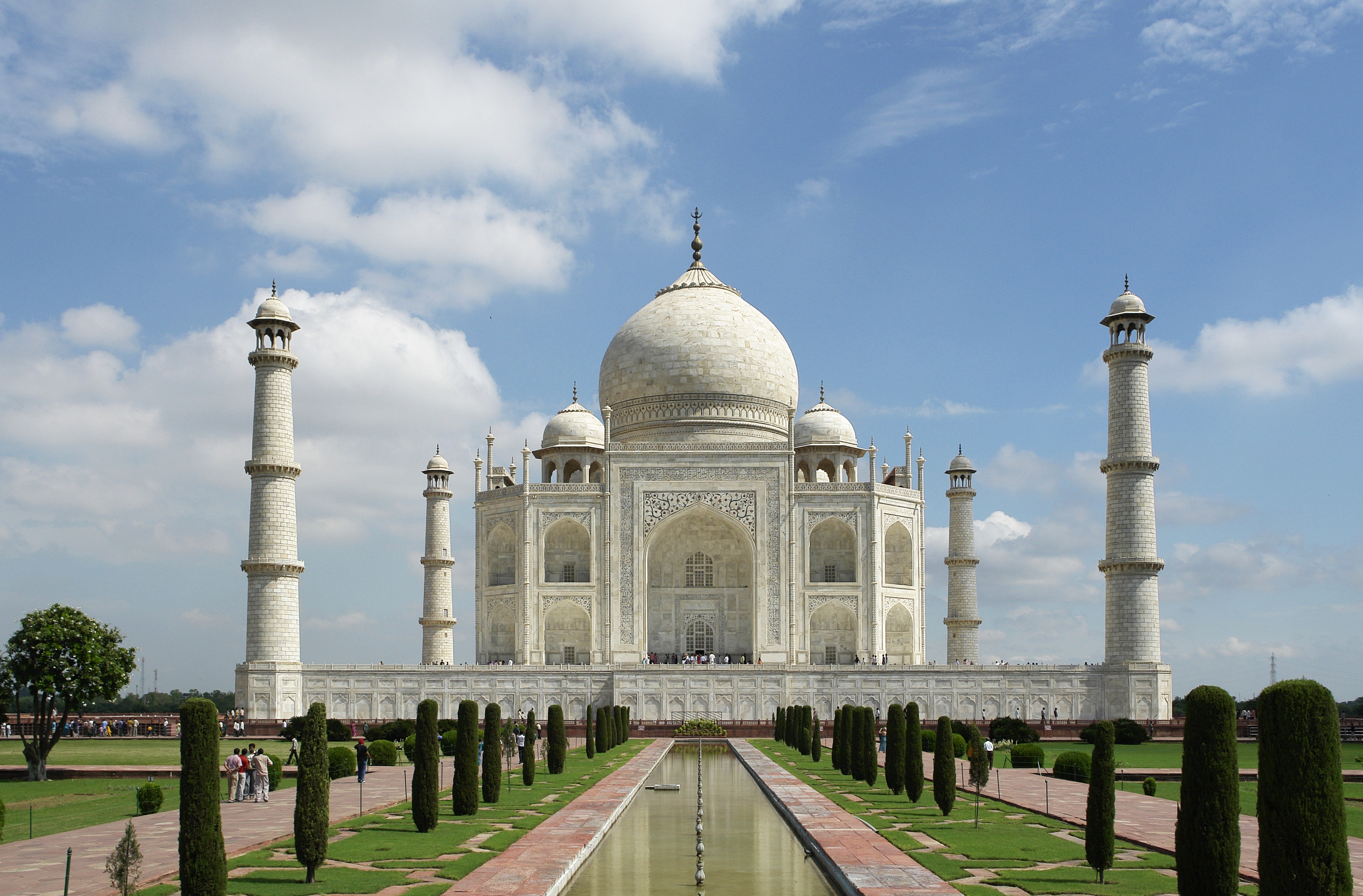
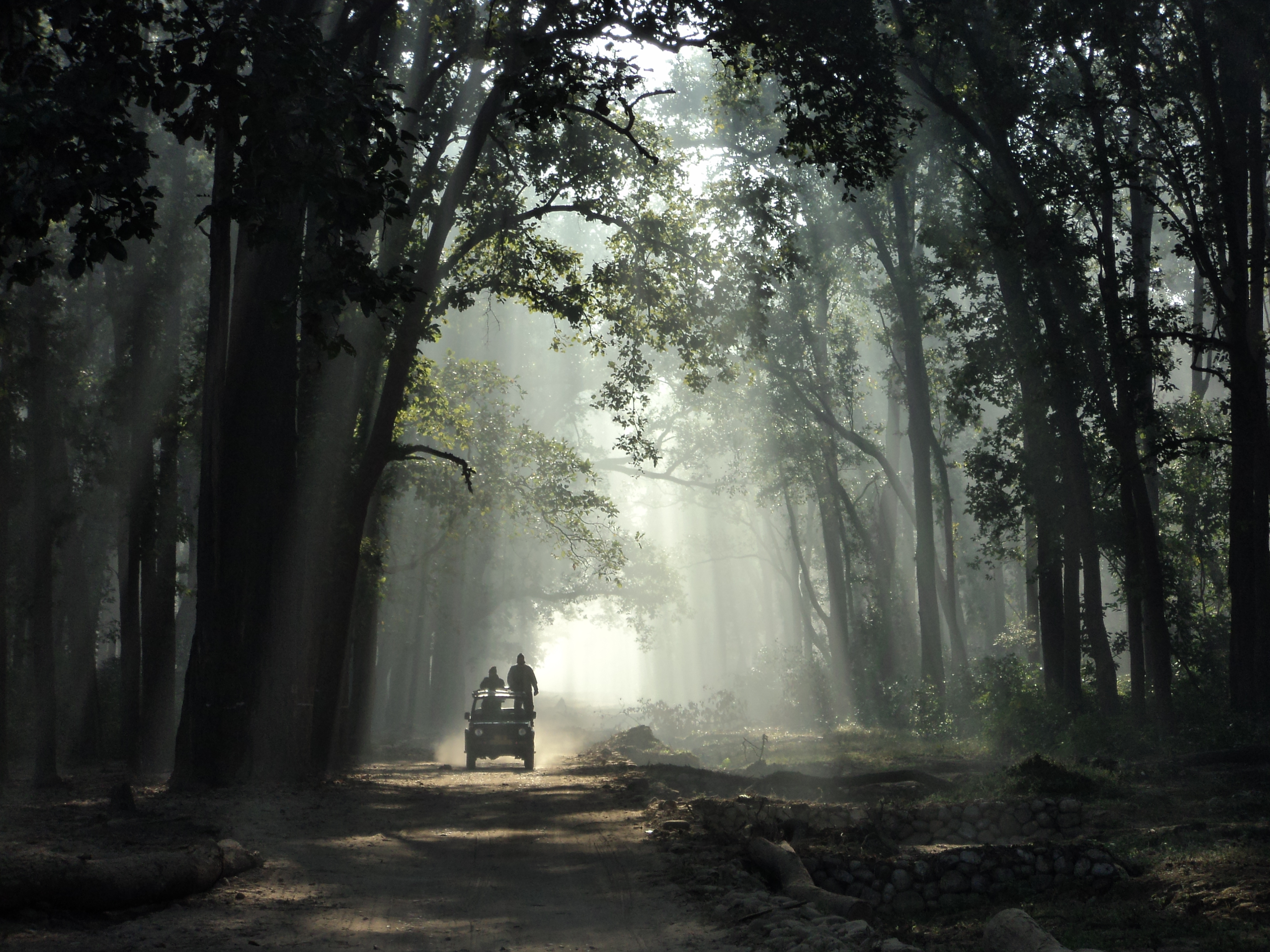
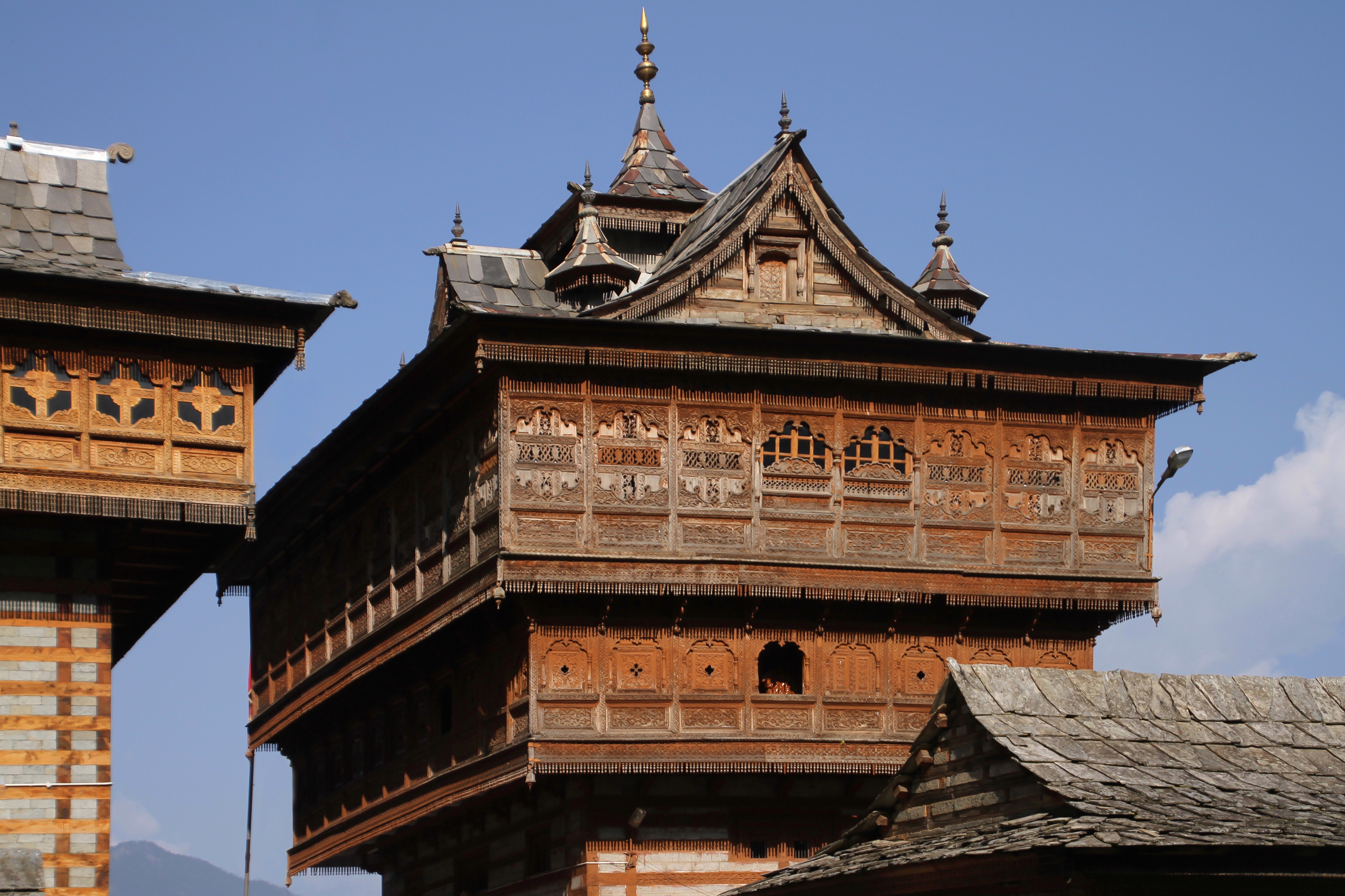
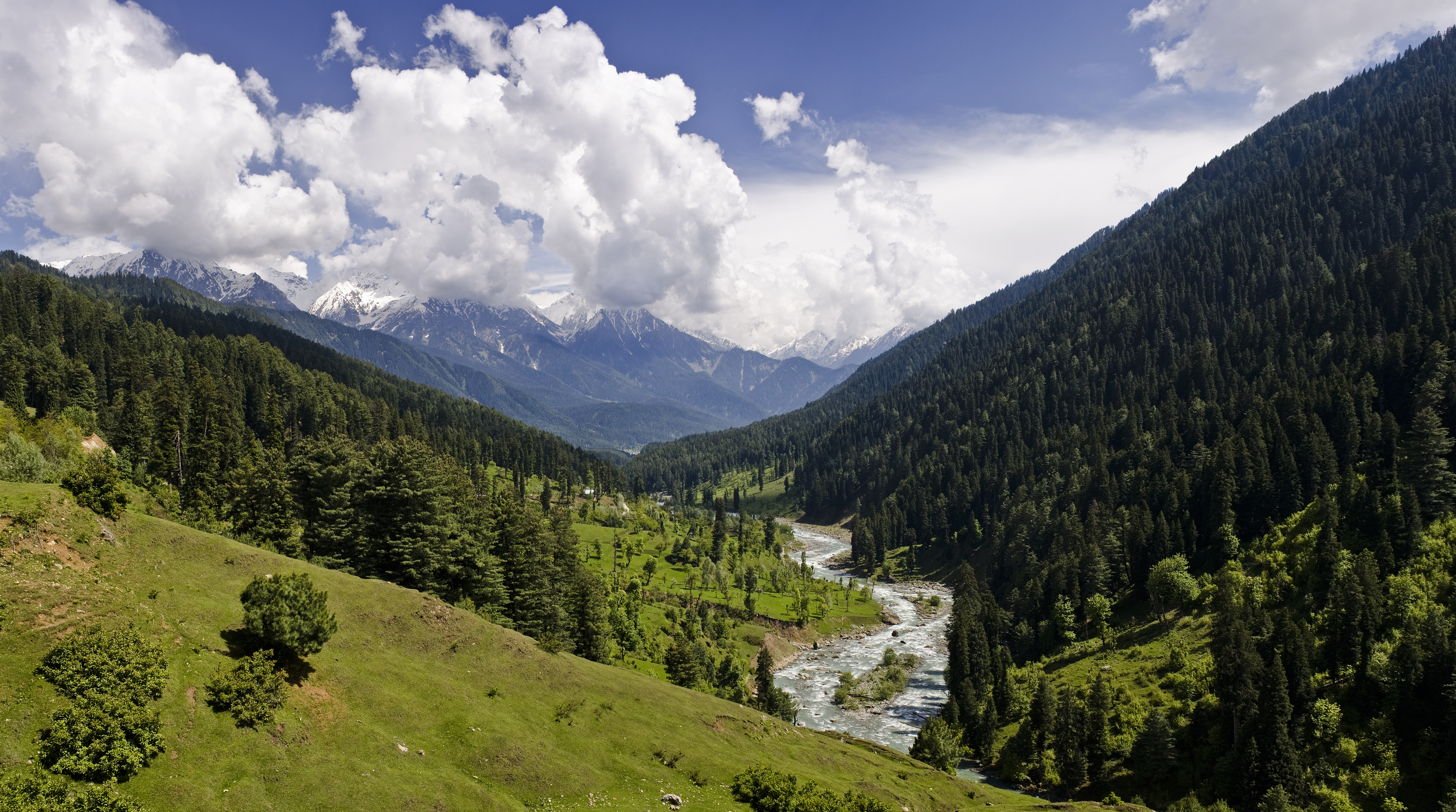
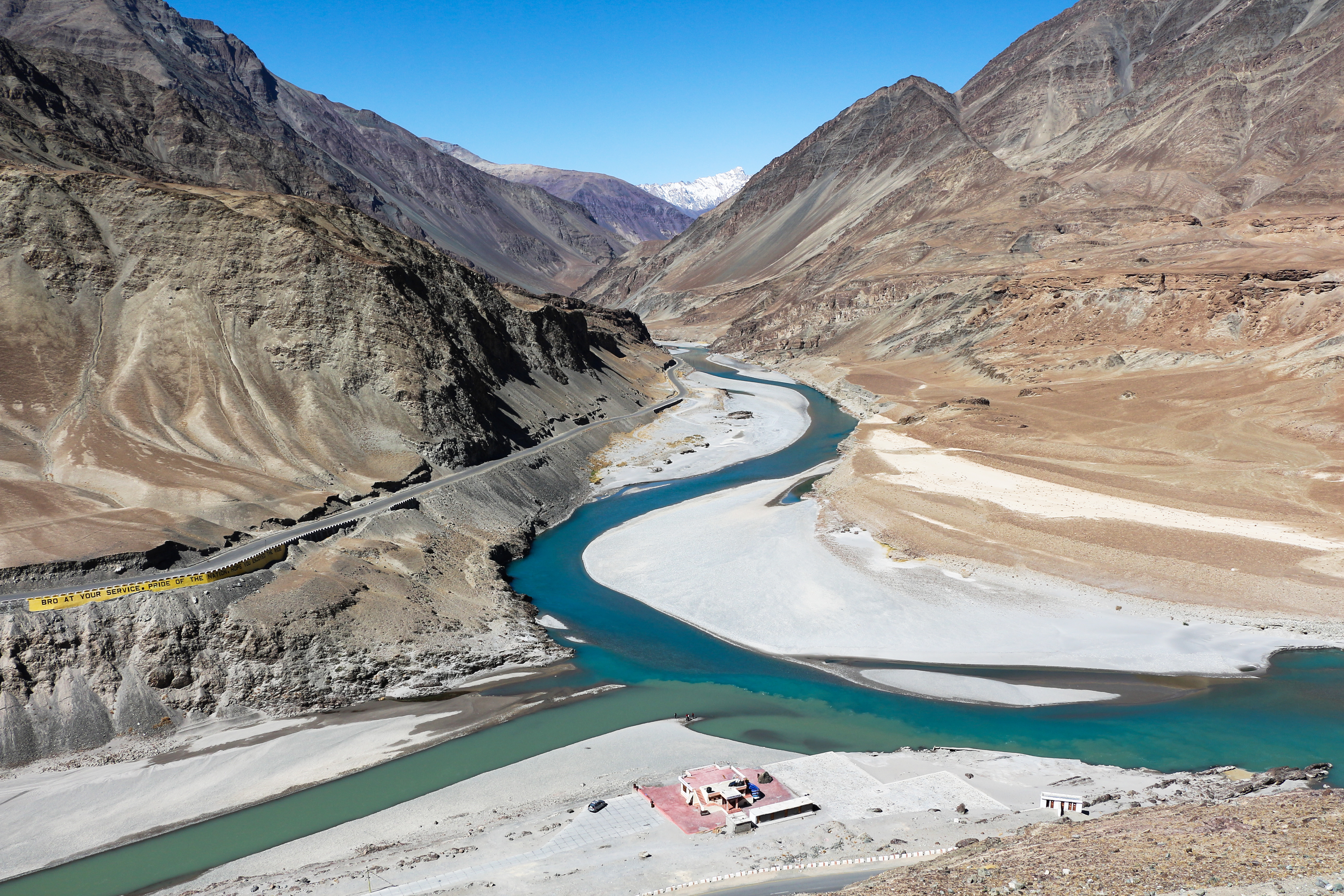
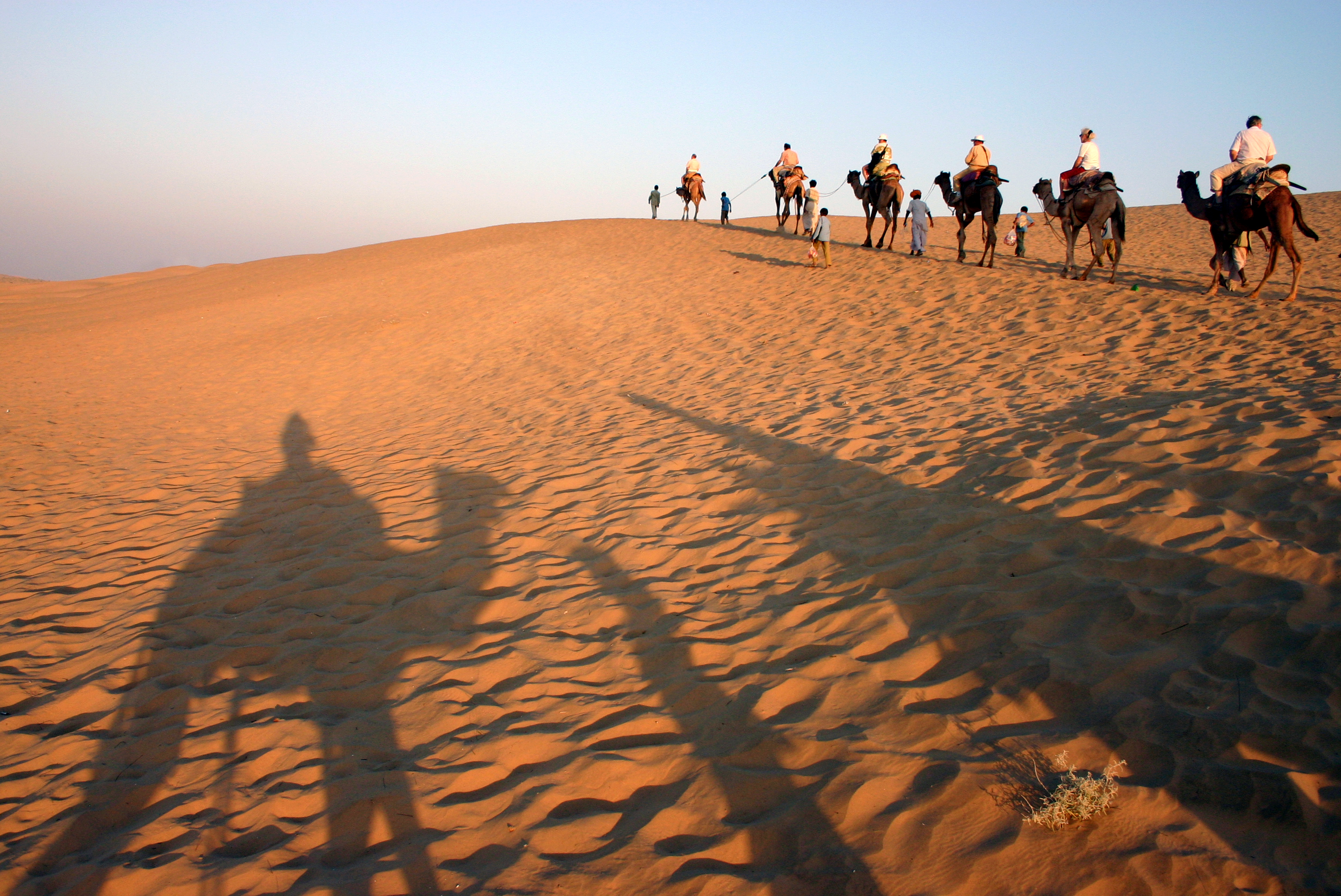
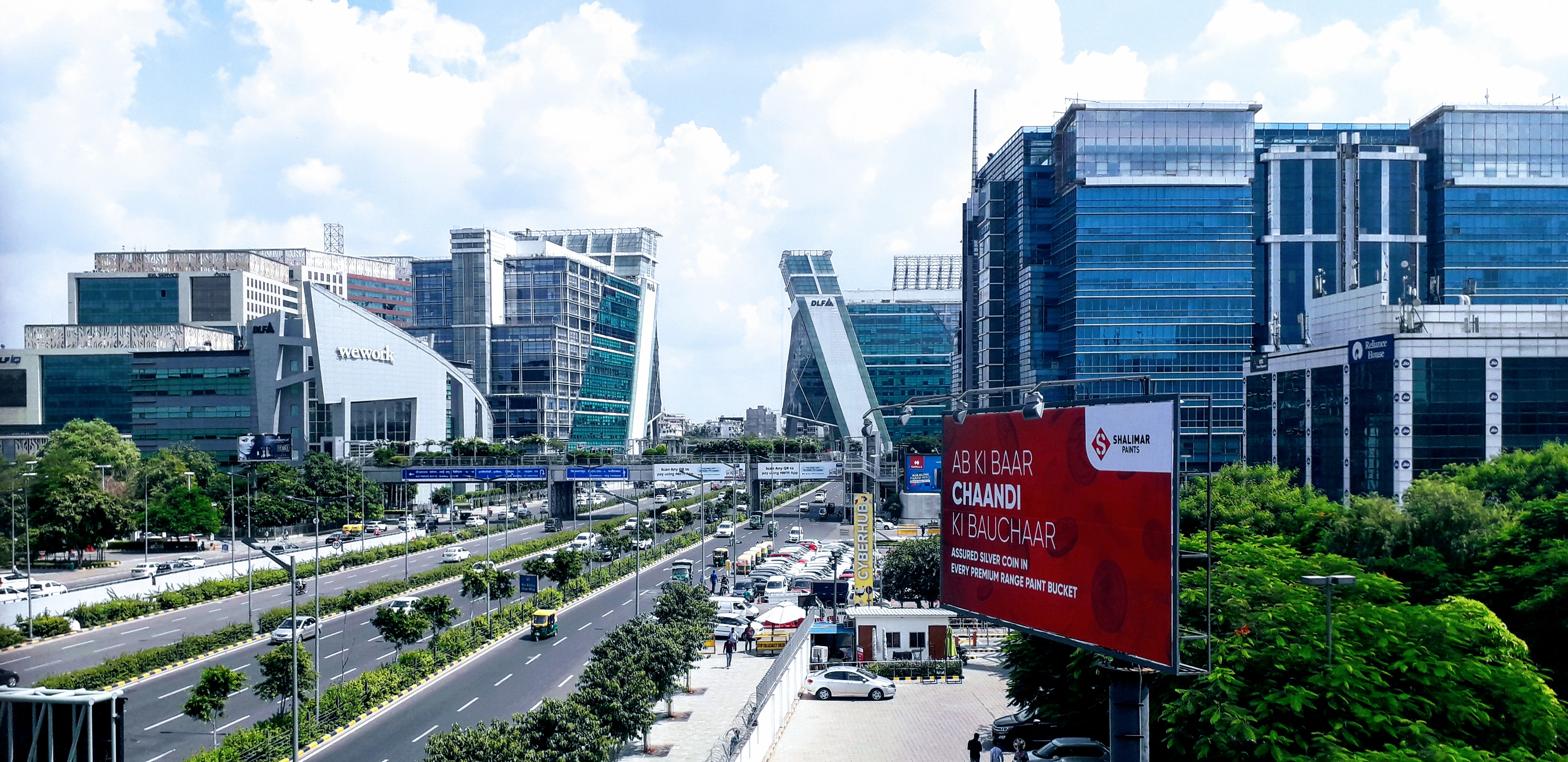
- From top, left to right: Taj Mahal, Jim Corbett National Park, Bhimakali Temple, Pahalgam, Confluence of Zanskar River and Indus River in Ladakh, Thar Desert, Cyber City Gurgaon

- Country: India
- States: Haryana; Himachal Pradesh; Punjab; Rajasthan; Uttar Pradesh; Uttarakhand
- Union territories: Chandigarh; National Capital Territory of Delhi; Jammu and Kashmir; Ladakh
- Largest city: New Delhi
- Most populous cities (2011): Agra; New Delhi; Lucknow; Ludhiana; Jaipur; Jodhpur

Area
  - Total: 892,126 km^{2} (344,452 sq mi)

Population (2026)
  - Total: 435,601,000
  - Density: 488.273/km^{2} (1,264.62/sq mi)
- Time zone: IST (UTC+05:30)
- Native languages: Awadhi; Braj Bhasha; Dogri; Garhwali; Haryanvi; Hindi; Jaunsari; Kangri; Kashmiri; Khariboli; Kumaoni; Kullui; Ladakhi; Mahasu Pahari; Marwari; Pahari Kinnauri; Punjabi; Sirmauri

Northwest India is a loosely defined region of India. In modern-day, it consists of north-western states of the Republic of India. In historical contexts, it refers to the northwestern Indian subcontinent (including modern-day Pakistan).

In contemporary definition, it generally includes the states of Haryana, Himachal Pradesh, Punjab, Rajasthan Uttarakhand, and often Uttar Pradesh, along with the union territories of Chandigarh, Jammu and Kashmir, (Note: India also claims the territory of Pakistan-administered Azad Kashmir as a part of Jammu and Kashmir.) Ladakh, (Note: India also claims the territory of Pakistan-administered Gilgit-Baltistan and Chinese-administered Aksai Chin as a part of Ladakh.) and the National Capital Territory of Delhi. Gujarat, a western coastal state, is occasionally included as well. The mountainous upper portion of Northwest India consists of the Western Himalayas, while the flat lower portion consists of the middle portion of the Indo-Gangetic Plain and the Thar Desert.

Northwest India borders Pakistan to the west, and the Tibet Autonomous Region and Xinjiang of China to the northeast. (Note: India also claims to have a border with Afghanistan to the northwest due to its claim on Kashmir, the relevant part of which is controlled by Pakistan. (See Borders of India#Land borders of India.)) Before the Partition of India, the term "Northwest India" included the entirety of Punjab, Sindh and North West Frontier Province, in addition to the territory of modern-day India west of the 77th meridian east and north of the 24th parallel north.

Since the ancient period, the region has been subject to foreign invasions. In the ancient era, it was part of the Indo-Greek Kingdom, followed by the Kushan Empire. The region was invaded and conquered by the Ghurid Empire in the twelfth century. In the eighteenth century, the region was invaded and ransacked by invaders from Afghanistan and Iran. In the late eighteenth and early nineteenth centuries, the Punjab region was ruled by Sikh Misls. The Rajputs ruled the Thar region and occasionally the upper plains from the mediaeval era till the formation of the Indian Union (1947). The Kingdom of Kashmir existed from the ancient era until its conquest in 1586 by Mughal Emperor Akbar. It was re-instated in 1849 and existed till its accession to the Indian Union in 1947.

The Kashmir region is disputed between China, India, and Pakistan. India claims the entirety of Kashmir, including the Trans-Karakoram Tract (a.k.a. the Shaksgam Valley), but the regions of Azad Kashmir and Gilgit-Baltistan are controlled by Pakistan while Aksai Chin and the Trans-Karakoram Tract are controlled by China.

== History ==
=== Ancient era ===
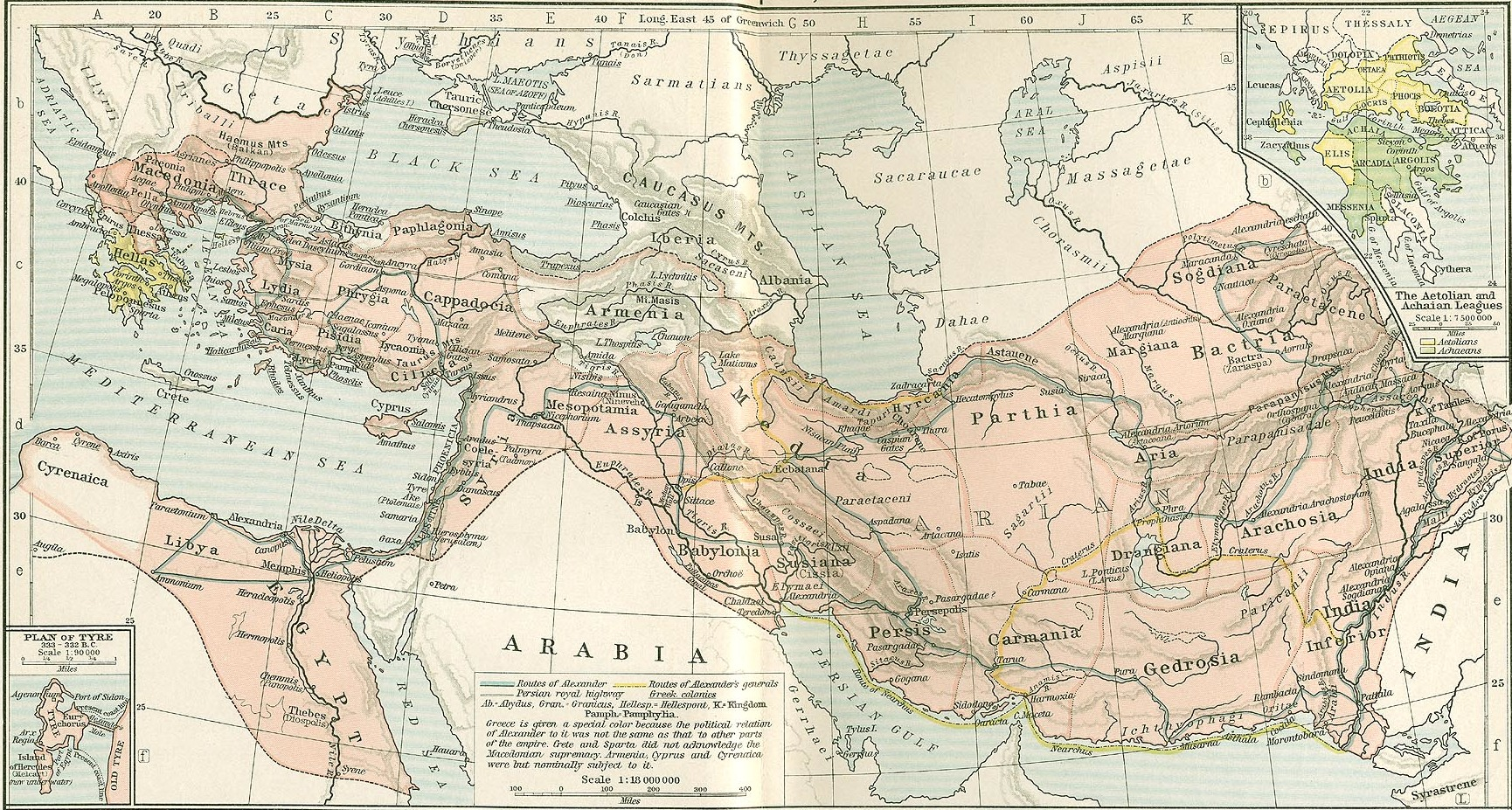
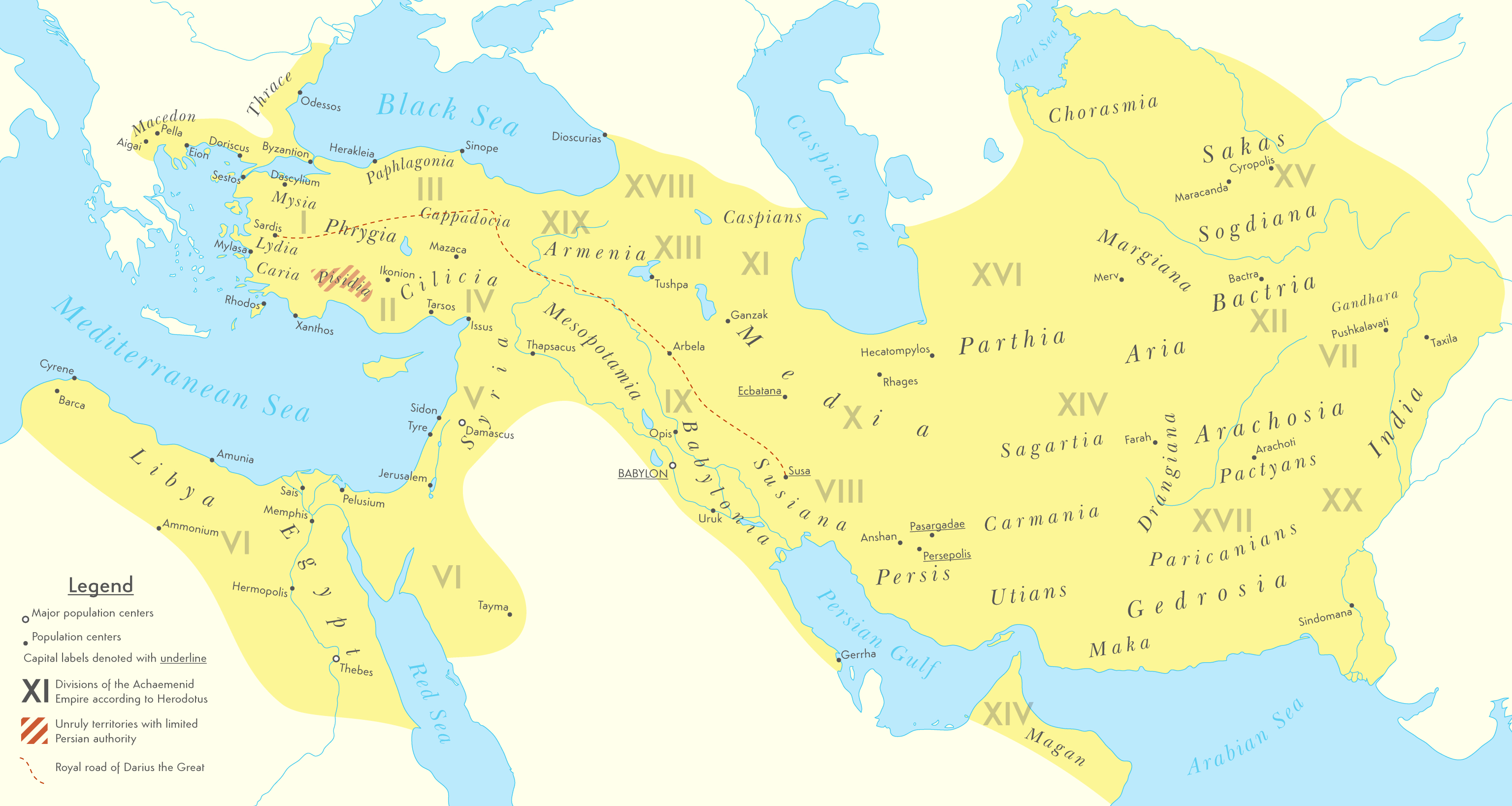
The Macedonian Empire (left) after conquering the First Persian Empire (right)

The region was a part of the Indus Valley Civilisation until it decayed and following the Indo-Aryan migrations, the Kingdom of Kashmir in Kashmir region and other small kingdoms in the Gangetic plains were established during the Vedic era. The surrounding region was part of the First Persian Empire until it was briefly conquered by the Macedonian Empire under Alexander the Great, following which the region was conquered by the Maurya Empire under Chandragupta Maurya. In 185 BC, Demetrius I, the son of the King of Bactria, conquered the western part of the Maurya Empire and established the Indo-Greek Kingdom. After the death of Menander I in 130 BC, multiple Indo-Greek kingdoms ruled various territories in the region. Indo-Scythians, in modern-day Afghanistan, Balochistan and Sindh, warred with the Indo-Greeks eventually captured all of their strongholds except the one at Sagala. In middle Ganga plain, the Kingdom of Panchala regained its independence from the collapsing Mauryan Empire in 107 BC.

In AD 10, the Indo-Scythian satrap of Mathura captured the last Indo-Greek stronghold at Sagala. In AD 19, the Governor of Sakastan in the Parthian Empire to the west declared independence and established the Indo-Parthian Kingdom. The Indo-Parthian Kingdom was conquered by the Kushan Empire by the mid-first century and in the early second century conquered the Indo-Scythian kingdom of Mathura. The Kushan Empire expanded further into the Gangetic plain and made the Kingdom of Panchala its tributary state for a brief period until early third century when it lost controlled over northwest India. By mid third century, the Kushan Empire had fallen under the control of the Second Persian Empire. Multiple kingdoms came up in northwest India. Some of these were the Yaudheya Confederation and the Arjunayana State. To the east still existed the Kingdom of Panchala.

=== Medieval era ===
In 607, Harsha inherited both the Principality of Thanesar and the Kingdom of Kannauj and was declared the Emperor of Kannauj. He conquered vast territories in North India. The empire, however, was short-lived and collapsed in 647. The rump state of Kannauj was ruled by Arunasva.

Between 725 and 770, Kingdom of Kannauj was ruled by the House of Varman. In 770, Bhoja, King of Kannauj was deposed by Vajrayudha founding the House of Ayudha. This triggered Kannauj Wars (770–854) for the control over the Kingdom of Kannauj between three great powers — the Gurjara Empire under the Rajput Pratihara dynasty, the Bengal Empire under the House of Pala, and the Rashtrakuta Empire. In 785, Vatsaraja, the Gurjara Emperor invaded Kannauj, made Indrayudha, the King of Kannuj his vassal. In response to this, Dharmapala, the Emperor of Bengal invaded Kannauj and deposed Indrayudha and replaced him with Indrayudha's brother, Chakrayudha whom he made his vassal. This obviously led to war and the Gurjara Empire defeated Bengal and the Gurjara Emperor Vatsaraja occupied Kannauj. Rashtrakuta Emperor Dhruva defeated the Gurjara Empire and Vatsaraja fled his empire, while Dhruva returned to his empire. Bengal re-installed Chakrayudha as the King of Kannauj and its vassal.

After the death of Dhruva in 793, the Rashtrakuta Empire fell into a war of succession. In the Gurjara Empire, the son of Vatsaraja, Nagabhata II, seeking revenge and taking advantage of the succession crisis in the Rashtrakuta Empire, invaded Kannauj and defeated Dharmapala and made Chakrayudha his vassal. Before he could invade Bengal however, the new Rashtrakuta Emperor Govinda III invaded Kannauj and defeated the Gurjara armies, and Nagabhatta retreated back to his empire. Dharmapala and Chakrayudha acknowledged Govinda III as their overlords to earn his friendship after which Govinda went back and Kannauj came back under Bengal rule in 800. Kannauj remained a vassal of the Bengal Empire until 816 when the Gurjara Emperor Nagabhata II invaded the Kingdom of Kannauj and conquered it and made the city of Kannauj its capital.

In 912, owing to an inner conflict, multiple feudatory kingdoms declared their independence — the Kingdom of Malwa, the Kingdom of Jejakabhukti, the Kingdom of Tripuri, the Kingdom of Sambhar (later the Kingdom of Ajmer) under the House of Chauhan, and the Kingdom of Delhi under the House of Tomar. The Kingdom of Kannauj was revived by the House of Gahadavala in 1089 by ousting the Kingdom of Tripuri to its southern territories. The Kingdom of Amber and the Kingdom of Jaisalmer declared independence from the Kingdom of Sambhar in 1128 and 1156 respectively. The Kingdom of Sambhar conquered the Kingdom of Delhi in 1152.

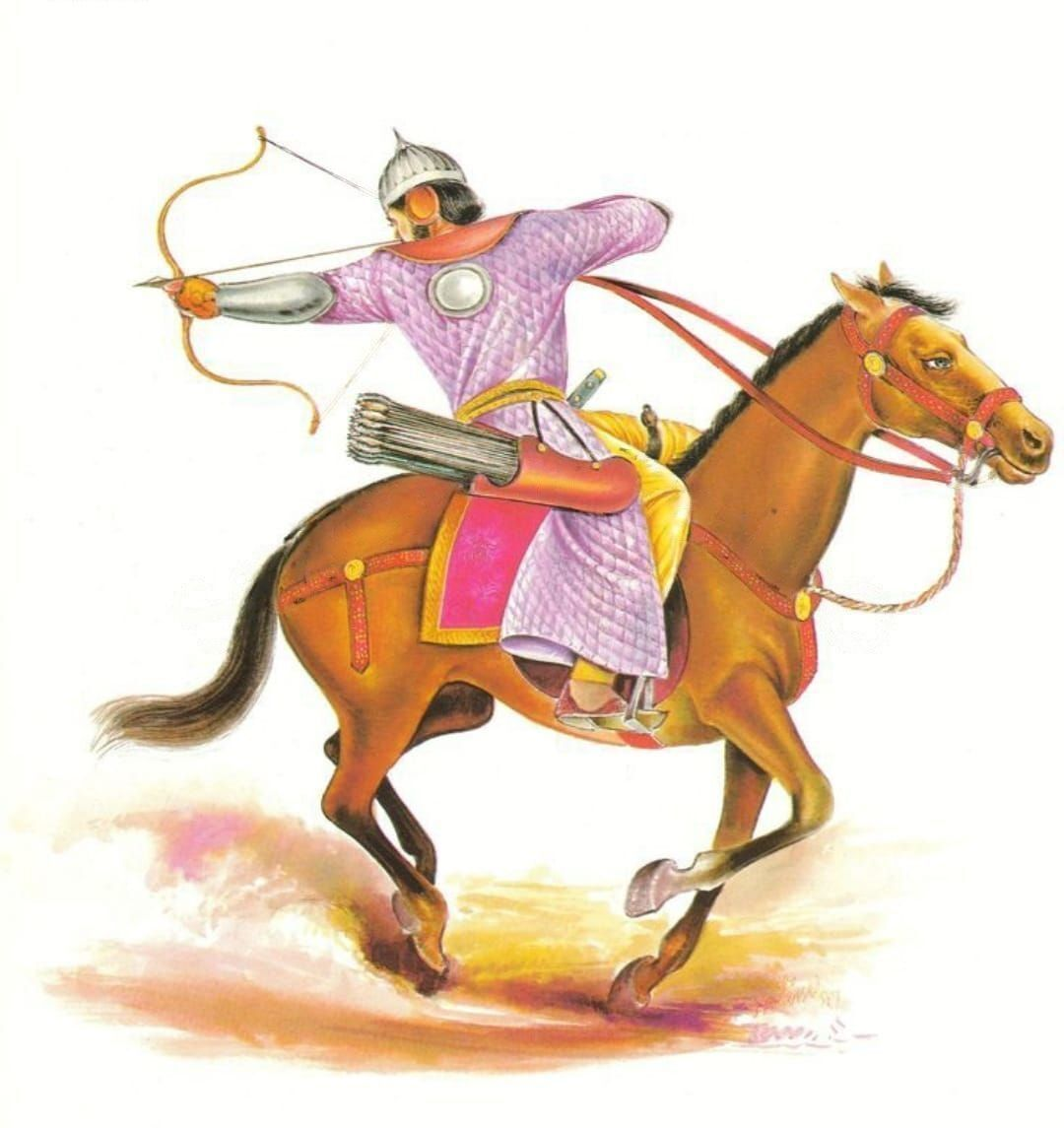
A light cavalry soldier from the 15th-century Delhi Sultanate under Khizr Khan

The Ghurid Empire conquered the Kingdom of Sambhar in 1192 and the Kingdom of Kannauj in 1197. However the empire collapsed in 1206 and the Indian territories were consolidated by his general Qutub-ud-din Aibak, who proclaimed himself the Sultan of Delhi in 1206. This region was the core of the Delhi Sultanate for the following centuries. The Delhi Sultanate defeated the invading Mongol Empire and saved India from the destruction that had met Central and Western Asia.

=== Modern era ===
In 1526, Babur, Emir of Kabul, defeated Ibrahim Lodhi, Sultan of Delhi and took over the sultanate. Following this, he defeated the Rajput Confederation and proclaimed himself the King of Hindustan and founded the House of Babur (Mughal dynasty). Akbar, third Mughal Emperor, annexed the Kingdom of Kashmir in 1586 and brought the Rajput kingdoms under his suzerainty.

In the eighteenth century, Punjab region broke free, and the Sikh Confederacy was established in the region. The remaining portion remained a part of the empire. During this period, the region and the empire was invaded by the Iranian Empire, followed by the Afghan Empire. The East India Company controlled the British territories within the Hindustani Empire and nominally functioned under the authority of the Shahenshah of Hindustan. It took over western parts of the Awadh province from the Nawab (governor) in 1783 and in 1803 became the official protectors of the Shahenshah. It made subsidiary military alliances with Rajput states in 1818. The same year the Nawab of Awadh declared his independence and established the Kingdom of Awadh, however it wasn't recognised widely, not even by the people of Awadh who continued to call him Nawab.

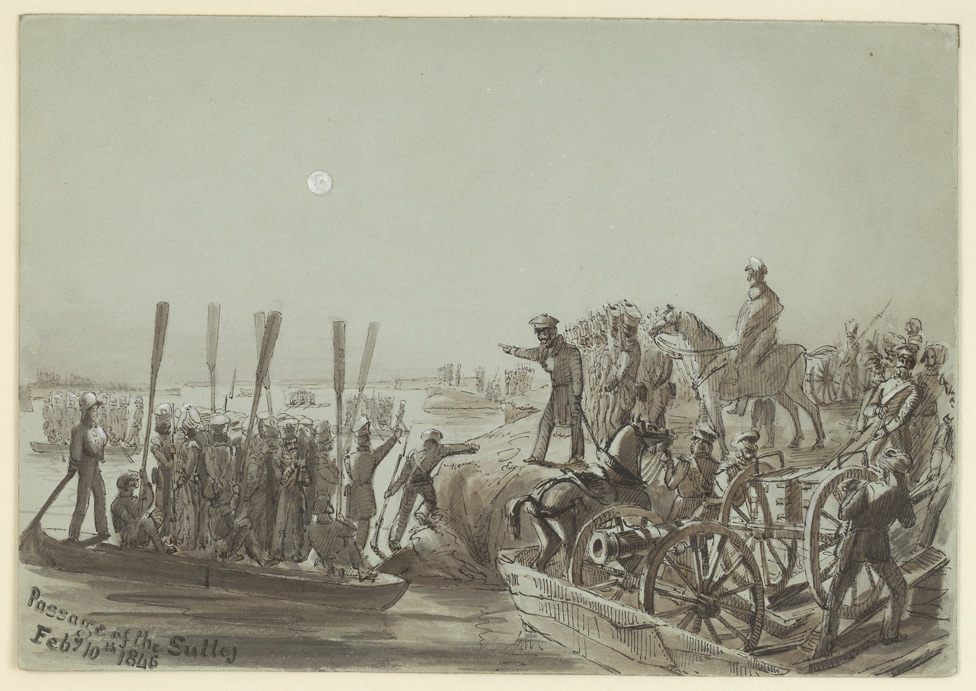
British troops crossing the Sutlej River in 1846 during the First Anglo-Sikh War

In 1835, the East India Company stopped recognising the authority of the Shahenshah of Hindustan, at that time Akbar II, and downgraded him to King of Delhi. In 1843, Sindh was annexed into British India. British historian John Keay notes that while most of British India had generally been consolidated through treaties and more nonviolent means, much of the northwest in what is now Pakistan had to be physically conquered. The East India Company annexed parts of the Sikh Empire in 1846 in the aftermath of ruler Ranjit Singh's death and re-established the Kingdom of Kashmir, and the entire Sikh Empire, having been weakened by internal divisions and political mismanagement, fell to the British in 1849 in the Second Anglo-Sikh War. In 1856, the Company annexed the Kingdom of Awadh.

During the Indian Rebellion of 1857, the troops of the Bengal Army under the East India Company mutinied and marched towards Delhi. The troops in the forts on their way also mutinied and joined them. They finally reached Delhi in 12 May, and proclaimed Bahadur Shah II the Shahenshah of Hindustan. The Shahenshah declared war against the East India Company and wrote letters to the various kingdoms and principalities of the erstwhile empire. Many declared their allegiance to the Shahenshah and supported the declaration of war. In many states that supported the company, the troops rebelled and acquired control, and joined the war nonetheless. However many of the larger states like Hyderabad, Mysore and Kashmir remained neutral. The United Kingdom got involved in this war after the East India Company suffered initial defeats. The war lasted until 1858 after which Britain proclaimed its victory. Bahadur Shah was exiled to Burma and the British Crown began directly ruling British territories in India and dissolved the East India Company. The various alliances and treaties with various kingdoms and states (such as the Kingdom of Kashmir and Punjab and Rajput states) made by the East India Company were transferred to the British Crown as well.

Due to Russian expansion into Central Asia, British anxieties began to be concentrated in the mid-1860s on fortifying the northwestern frontier of British India (see also: Great Game and North-West Frontier Province). In 1876, Victoria was declared the Empress of India, and the Indian Empire was established consisting of British India and the various princely states.

=== Contemporary era ===
The northwesternmost portions of India separated upon independence, forming West Pakistan (now Pakistan)

In 1947, the Indian Empire was dissolved and British India was divided into the Dominion of India and the Dominion of Pakistan while the various princely states acceded to one of the two states. The First Kashmir War was fought between the Indian Union and Pakistan from 1947 to 1948 over the Kingdom of Jammu and Kashmir, resulting in Gilgit-Baltistan in the northwestern part of the kingdom and an eastern strip becoming a part of Pakistan. In 1961, the Sino-Indian War, broke out between the Indian Republic and the newly established People's Republic of China, resulting in Aksai Chin coming under Chinese control. The Second Kashmir War (1965) was inconclusive with minor territorial changes in the region. The Indo-Pakistani war of 1971 during the Bangladesh Liberation War, lasted for only 13 days, and culminated in an Indian victory with minor territorial changes in the Kashmir region.

During the 2025 India–Pakistan conflict, flights were diverted from Pakistan and northwest India.

== Organisation ==
=== British Empire ===
In late nineteenth century, the region had three provinces – North-Western Provinces, Chief Commissioner's Province of Oudh and the Province of the Punjab. To the extreme there was the Kingdom of Kashmir and Jammu, below that the Punjab States, and to its south, the Rajputana Agency.

By 1945, the region had been slightly re-organised. The Punjab States Agency was created out of the Punjab States, and the Chief Commissioner's Province of Delhi was created out of Punjab Province. The Oudh province and the North-Western provinces had been merged to form the United Provinces of Agra and Oudh.

=== Dominion of India ===
After the dissolution of the Indian Empire and the partitioning of British India, the Dominion of India was created which included the Province of East Punjab and the United Provinces to the northwest. Jammu and Kashmir, the Punjab States Agency (except Bahawalpur) and the Rajputana Agency joined the Union of India. Following this, the Patiala and East Punjab States Union, the Rajasthan Union and Province of Himachal Pradesh were created.

=== Republic of India ===
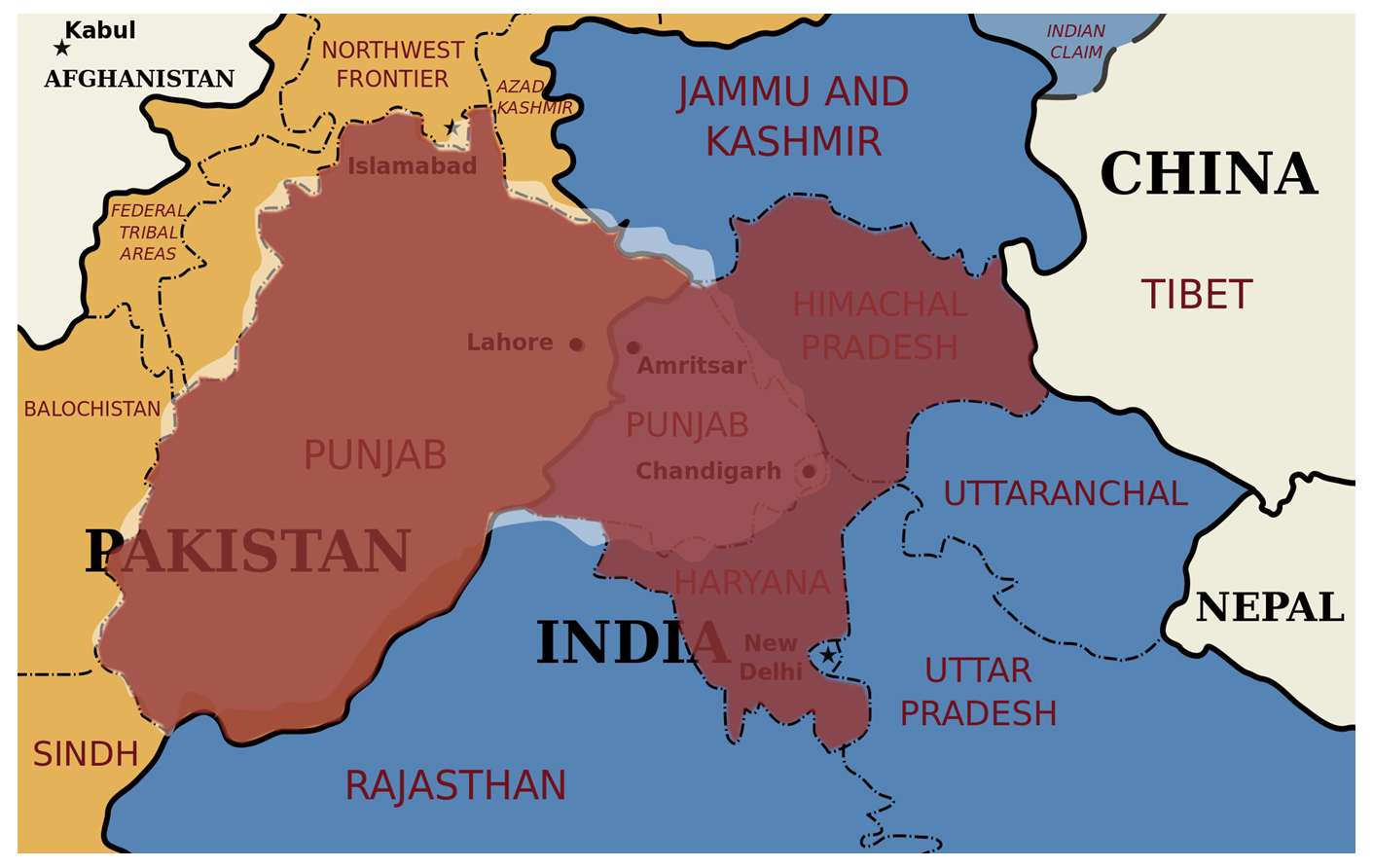
British Punjab (red) overlaid onto current Indian (blue) and Pakistani (orange) subdivisions

After India became a republic in 1950, all provinces were declared States of the Indian Union. United Provinces became the State of Uttar Pradesh and the State of Himachal Pradesh, State of Punjab, State of Rajasthan and State of Jammu and Kashmir were created. Delhi Province became a union territory.

In 1966, Haryana was separated from Punjab, and in 2000, Uttarakhand was separated from Uttar Pradesh. In 2019, the statehood of Jammu and Kashmir was terminated and the union territories of Jammu and Kashmir and Ladakh were created.

== Geography ==
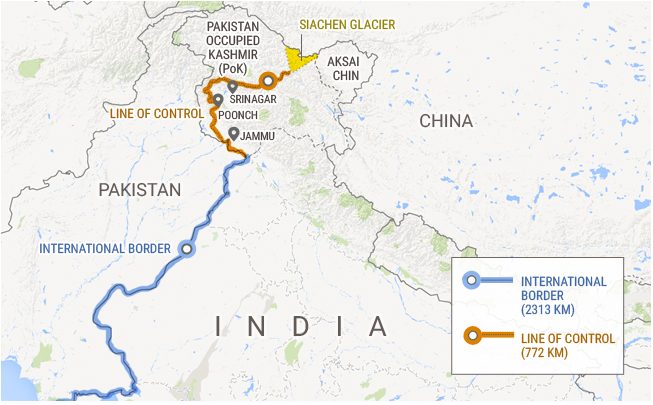
The border between Northwest India and Pakistan

The region consists of four main regions – the Western Himalayas covering the states and territories of Jammu and Kashmir, Ladakh, Himachal Pradesh and Uttarakhand; the Sutlej-Yamuna Plain covering the states of Punjab, Haryana, Chandigarh and Delhi; the Upper Gangetic plain covering the state of Uttar Pradesh; and the Thar Desert covering the state of Rajasthan.

The northern part is mountainous and includes the Western Himalayas and extends into the Tibetan Plateau. The states of Jammu and Kashmir, Himachal and Uttarakhand are located in the Western Himalayas. The union-governed territory of Ladakh is the western part of the Tibetan Plateau.

The southern region is flat and consists of the middle portion of Indo-Gangetic Plain and the Thar Desert. The states of Punjab and Haryana are located in the Trans-Gangetic plain along with the territories of Chandigarh and National Capital Territory, and the state of Uttar Pradesh is located in the Upper Gangetic plain or the Doab region. The state of Rajasthan extends across the Thar Desert and a small part of the Gangetic plain.

== Languages ==
The languages spoken in this region belong to the Indo-Aryan language family of the Indo-European languages and are divided into six main groups: Dardic languages, Pahari languages, Northwestern Indo-Aryan languages, Rajasthani languages, and Central Indo-Aryan languages. Kashmiri and Shina (of the Dardic group) and Dogri (of the Pahari group) are spoken in Jammu and Kashmir, Punjabi (northwestern Indo-Aryan language) is spoken in Punjab, Kumaoni and Garhwali (of the Pahari group) are spoken in Uttarakhand, Himachali languages (of the Pahari group) are spoken in Himachal Pradesh, Haryanvi (Central Indo-Aryan language) is spoken in Haryana, Hindi and Awadhi (Central Indo-Aryan languages) are spoken in Haryana, Delhi, Chandigarh, Uttar Pradesh, and Rajasthani languages are spoken in Rajasthan.

Sino-Tibetan languages, like Tibetan and Ladakhi, are spoken in Ladakh.

== See also ==
- India–Pakistan relations
- Kashmir conflict
- Mahasu region
- Western Uttar Pradesh – Region in northern India
- Northwestern South Asia
