= Mahaviracharita =

8th-century Sanskrit play by Bhavabhūti

Mahaviracharita ("Exploits of a Great Hero") is a play by the 8th-century Sanskrit playwright Bhavabhuti based on the early life of Rama, the hero of the Ramayana and venerated as a Hindu deity. It is the first play of Bhavabhuti, thus lacking in character and style compared to his two known later works: Malatimadhava and Uttararamacharita. Though currently composed of seven acts, the whole present text may not have been composed by Bhavabhuti.

== Structure and plot ==
The play is composed of seven acts. Most modern scholars agree that Bhavabhuti has written the play from the beginning only to the 46th verse of Act V. According to one theory, the rest of the play is lost to time. Another theory suggests that Bhavabuti left the play incomplete after the 46th verse of Act V. However, two different extensions replace the lost material to make up seven acts. The North Indian version is composed by a poet Vinayaka and the South Indian version is attributed to Subrahmanya, but this is disputed. Both versions do not resemble Bhavabuti's style. However, the North Indian version is considered better in quality than the South Indian version.

=== Bhavabhuti's original: Act I - V.46 ===
The prologue starts with the sutradhara (narrator) singing the prayer to God, followed by the introduction of Bhavabhuti and the themes of the play, pointing out the starting point and context of the story portrayed in Act I. In Act I, the sage Vishwamitra has called his disciples Rama and his brother Lakshmana to guard his sacrifice against demons. He has also invited King Siradhwaja Janaka to the sacrifice site but he is unable to attend and sends his brother Kushadhvaja and daughters Sita and Urmila as his delegates.

Act I begins with Vishwamitra introducing the Ayodhyan princes to Kushadhvaja, who in turn introduces his nieces to the sage. From behind the curtain, Ahalya hails Rama as her saviour and Vishwamitra tells her story to the Mithila royalty. Sita realizes that Rama is no ordinary being and develops feelings for him. Sarvamaya, a messenger of the demon king of Lanka - Ravana - demands Sita for his king. An angry Lakshamana reacts, but is pacified by Rama. Suddenly, demoness Tataka attacks the sacrifice site. Vishwamitra orders Rama to slay her, but Rama hesitates to kill a woman. The sage justifies her slaying since she otherwise would slay the priests. The powerful Tataka is killed, shocking Sarvamaya. A pleased Vishwamitra grants the princes divine weapons. Kushadhvaja wishes to have Rama as his son-in-law. Janaka imposes a condition, only the man who can string the enormous bow of the god Shiva may win the hand of Sita. So, Rama mounts the string on the bow, breaking it in the process. Kushadhvaja and Vishwamitra decide to marry Sita and Urmila to Rama and Lakshamana. Tataka's sons Maricha and Subahu attack the sacrifice site. Vishwamitra orders Rama to slay them, ending the Act.

In Act II, Ravana's minister Malyavan and sister Surpanakha discuss news of Tataka and Subahu's death, Maricha's narrow escape and Rama's marriage. A letter from Parshurama arrives with a veiled threat to Ravana to stop atrocities on sages in Dandaka Forest or face the consequences. It offers friendship on condition he stops the carnage. Malyavan provokes Parshurama against Rama, who broke his guru Shiva's bow. In the main scene of the act, an enraged Parshurama arrives in Mithila and dashes into the inner chambers of Rama and Sita. Rama — embraced by a frightened Sita — meets Parshurama and praises him to calm the warrior-sage. While Sita is taken away, on the orders of Parshurama, Janaka and his family-priest Satananda arrive on the scene and send Rama inside. Satananda tries to pacify Parshurama and reminds him that he had broken social norms by entering the inner chambers, but Parshurama pays no heed.

The sage Vashishtha, family-priest of Rama, Vishwamitra and Satananda try to calm Parshurama in Act III, with arguments including the father Dasharatha's plea, the seniority of Vashishtha to Parshurama (thus Parshurama should listen to his uncle Vashishtha), and Satananda's warning to use his penance power against his cousin Parshurama. Janaka and Dasharatha intervene and accelerate the dispute. As the scene is set for a battle between Vishwamitra and Parshurama's penance powers, Rama enters and humbly praises Parshurama, who prepares to fight him.

In Act IV, Malyavan and Surpanakha visit Mithila in a flying machine and learn of Parshurama's defeat. Malyavan orders Surpanakha to possess the body of Manthara, Rama's stepmother queen Kaikeyi's maid. He plots to bring Rama to the Dandaka Forest where Ravana's demons and monkey ally Vali would get rid of him. Sita could then be easily acquired for Ravana and his brother Vibhishana would not be able to interfere. If he sides with Rama, the plan will fail and Lanka will be doomed, warns Malyavan. In the main scene, the defeated Parshurama politely talks to the sages and kings, with whom he quarrelled in the last Act and is forgiven for his transgressions. The sages bless Rama and Sita and leave. Parshurama gives away his weapons and requests Rama to protect the sages of Dandaka Forest. The possessed Manthara brings a false letter from Kaikeyi which instructs Dasharatha to send Rama to the forest for a 14-year exile and crown her son Bharata as king. Listening to this wish, Dasharatha faints. Bharata agrees to rule the kingdom till Rama returns and takes Rama's sandals as his reminder. The sorrow of Ayodhya is then described. Rama with Sita and Lakshmana leave for the forest and set up camp in Chitrakuta, where demon Viradha is troubling the people.

Act V starts with a short story about Surpanakha lusting for Rama and Lakshmana cutting her nose, when they moved to Panchavati. Demons Khara, Dushana and Trisiras attack in vindication and are killed. The vulture Jatayu sees Rama and Lakshmana chasing a deer, while Ravana kidnaps Sita. Jatayu dies trying to protect Sita. In his last words, he reveals Sita's captor to Rama. As they move forward, they hear the distress call of Shramana. Lakshmana kills demon Kabandha and frees Shramana, the envoy who has joined forces with Vali's brother Sugriva. Malyavan instigates Vali to attack the grief-stricken Rama. Vali confronts Rama, and this is where Bhavabhuti's Act V ends.

=== North Indian manuscript ===
Act V continues with a fair duel between Vali and Rama. Rama slays Vali, who in his dying breath asks Rama for forgiveness and advises him to form an alliance with Sugriva and Vibhishana.

Act VI begins with a disappointed Malyavan learning that his plans have failed, Lanka is set on fire by Rama's monkey general Hanuman and Ravana's obsession with Sita and his wife Mandodari's plea to return Sita. In the main scene, Mandodari tells Ravana about a bridge of flowing rocks to by built by the monkeys. Rama's monkey envoy Angada arrives, but his peace deal is rejected. Battle preparations start. The god Indra and the gandharva Chitraratha come to witness the epic war. The whole war is presented as a dialogue between them. Finally, Rama slays Ravana.

Act VII starts with the presiding deities of the cities Lanka and Alaka discussing Sita's trial by fire, Vibhishana's coronation and Rama's preparations to return home. Rama and his party return to Ayodhya in Ravana's flying machine, describing the places they see below them. Hanuman flies ahead to convey the message of Rama's arrival to Bharata. A welcome party greets Rama and the play ends with Rama's coronation.

=== South Indian manuscript ===
Act V continues with Vali and Rama agreeing to fight.

In Act VI, Rama kills a deer, not knowing it is Vali, cursed by a sage and turned into a deer. Sage Agastya gives Rama divine vision so that he can see the evil designs of Malyavan and Ravana.

Act VII starts with a conversation between Indra and Dasharatha, who arrive from heaven in Ayodhya in a flying machine. They discuss Ravana's defeat, Vibhishana's coronation, Sita's fire ordeal and Rama's arrival in Ayodhya. The gods and sages bless the crowned Rama and Sita, ending the play.

== Themes ==
Though Bhavabhuti's inspiration is the Ramayana, the earliest narrative of Rama's life; he has deviated with the Ramayana plot at many places, like love feelings in Sita's heart, Kaikeyi absolved of all guilt, Surpanakha possessing Manthara and Rama killing Vali in a fair battle. Bhavabhuti has even quoted some Ramayana verses verbatim. A unique feature of the play is the plotting of Malyavan. While Ramayana is clear that Rama kills Vali justly from a hidden spot while Vali and Sugriva are in a duel, Bhavabhuti portrays Vali allying with the villain Ravana and killed in a fair battle, thus legitimatising the death of Vali at the hands of Rama.

The most prominent rasa is Vira or heroism, expressed in Rama's valorous speech. Other rasas include Raudra (anger), in Parshurama's speech and Bibhasta (disgust) in grotesque descriptions of demons and their corpses. Bhavabhuti uses 20 poetic metres in the 200 verses of the play.

Much about Bhavabhuti's life is known from the information given by him in the prologue of this play.

== Assessment ==
Two of the acts are devoted to a confrontation between Rama and Parashurama. This overstretched dialogue is considered as a sign of the immaturity of Bhavabhuti at this period. The play is also criticized as a listing of events rather than a coherent composition. Bhavabuti is praised for his characterization of the various epic personalities and his innovative remodeling of the story, inducing various new themes and events. Bhavabuti's analysis of politics and his handling of the Manthara, Surpanakha, and Parshurama episodes with Malyavan's devious background politics is commended.

== See also ==
- List of Sanskrit plays in English translation
