= Gaudavaho =

Epic poem by Vākpatirāja

- Author: Vākpatirāja
- Original title: गउडवहो
- Translator: Narhari Govind Suru
- Language: Prakrit
- Subject: Life of king Yashovarman
- Genre: Mahakavya
- Publication date: 8th century
- Publication place: Ancient India

Gaudavaho ("Slaying of the Gauda king"), also known as Gauḍavaha, is an 8th-century Prakrit-language epic poem by Vākpatirāja. It narrates the exploits of the poet's patron, king Yashovarman, who ruled in northern India. The poem deifies the king as an incarnation of the god Vishnu, and credits him with several military achievements, including slaying of the Gauda king.

A little over 1200 verses of the text are known from several manuscripts. According to some scholars including Georg Bühler, the surviving text is only a prelude to the larger poem that Vakpati intended to write, and possibly never finished.

== Authorship ==
Gaudavaho was composed by Vakpati-raja (Prakrit: "Bappai-rāa"), a court poet of king Yashovarman. He wrote in the first half of the 8th century. He states that he was known as Kavi-raja (Prakrit: "Kairāa", "king of poets"), an epithet possibly awarded to him by his patron Yashovarman. Kalhana's Rajatarangini suggests that both Vakpati and Bhavabhuti were court poets of Lalitaditya. Vakpati's reference to Bhavabhuti in Gaudavaho suggests that Bhavabhuti was not alive when Gaudavaho was composed. He appears to have been younger than Bhavabhuti, and probably a pupil or admirer of Bhavabhuti.

Vakpati was well-versed with the works of earlier poets such as Bhasa, Kalidasa, and Subandhu. He highly praised the Prakrit language, and composed two poems in it: Mahumaha-viyayo (Madhumatha-vijaya) and Gaudavaho. The first poem, which was composed earlier, is a lost work: Vakpati describes it as far superior to Gaudavaho.

Vallabhadeva's Subhashitavali suggests that his father's name was Harsha-deva; a verse is attributed to Harsha-deva in Subhashita Ratna Bhandagara. Soddhala's Udaya-sundari-katha states that Vakpati was born in a royal family. A verse in Halayudha's commentary on Pingala's work also suggests that Vakpati was a prince as well as a poet. However, a note on Halayudha's verse in Dasharupavaloka states that the Vakpati referred to here is to the 10th century Paramara king Vakpati Munja. A verse in Yashas-tilaka states that Vakpati-raja was imprisoned by Yashovarman, and composed his poem in the prison.

Bappabhatti-Suri-Charita, a biography of the Jain leader Bappabhatti-suri, claims that Vakpati was born in the Paramara royal family, and was imprisoned by king "Yashodharma". Vakpati wrote Gaudavaho in prison, and impressed by his poetic merit, Yashodharma freed him. Vakpati was a good friend of Bappabhatti, and converted from Brahmanism to Śvetāmbara sect of Jainism. A similar story is narrated in other Jain works, including Rajashekhara Suri's Prabandha Kosha and Prabhachandra Suri's Prabhavaka-charita. However, these works wrongly state that Mahumaha-vijayo was composed after Gaudavaho. Also, these stories do not allude to any association between Vakpati and Yashovarman: instead, they state that Vakpati was patronized by Āma, who is described as a son of Yashovarman. These Jain accounts can be dismissed as unreliable: they are mostly fabrications, aimed at showing how Bappabhatti was able to convert notable people including Vakpati to Jainism.

== Organization ==
Gaudavaho is organized in form of verses (gathas) grouped into kulikas or kulakas (group of verses with one theme, idea, or topic). But, it is not divided into cantos or chapters: this form was later adopted by Kutuhala for Lilavati. Pandit's critical edition contains 1209 verses, plus another 26 verses in the appnedix.

The language of Gaudavaho can be described as Maharashtri Prakrit. Vakpati's poetic style appears to be a mixture of "Gaudi" and "Vidarbhi", more of "Gaudi". The poem uses Arya and Gatha metres, except in verses 60 and 61, which use the Samagalitaka metre.

== Critical editions ==
In the 1870s, German Indologist Georg Bühler came across a manuscript of Gaudavaho at the Jaina Bhandara, Jaisalmer. He requested Indian scholar Shankar Pandurang Pandit to work on a critical edition of the text. Pandit consulted three more manuscripts from the Jaina collections of western India, as well as Haripala's Sanskrit language commentary on Gaudavaho. His critical edition - Bombay Sanskrit and Prakrit Series #34 - was published in 1887.

In 1927, N. B. Utgikar released a reprint of Pandit's edition, with notes from Bühler and Jacobi.

In 1975, Narhari Govind Suru came up with an updated critical edition with an English translation. This edition incorporated 26 additional gathas into the main text without translation; Pandit's edition included these gathas in the appendix.

== Completeness of the surviving text ==
The poem's title suggests that the slaying of the Gauda king would be its major theme. However, the surviving text mentions the incident only once. Out of more than 1200 verses, only 3 or 4 verses describe the conflict with the Gauda king. Moreover, the last gatha states that the life of the king "will now be narrated", asking the audience to listen.

Scholars such as Johannes Hertel and N. B. Utgikar regard the surviving text as a complete work, and believe that Vakpati had no intention of writing more. According to Utgikar, the last part of the poem refers to the composition of the preceding verses. The prominence of "Gauda" in the title of the poem can be attributed to the staunch rivalry between Yashovarman and the king of Gauda.

Other scholars, such as Pandit and Bühler, theorize that the surviving text of Gaudavaho is only a prelude to the larger work that Vakpati planned to write, but possibly could not complete. The colophon of three manuscripts describes the surviving text of Gaudavaho as katha-pitham (Prakrit: kahāvīḍhaṃ in two manuscripts, gāhāvīḍhaṃ in another). Bühler notes that katha-pitham is the title of the introductory parts of Somadeva's Katha-sarit-sagara and Kshemendra's Brhat-katha-manjari, both of which are Sanskrit-language adaptations of Brihatkatha.

Hermann Jacobi opposes this theory, stating that the surviving text is too large to have formed only a prelude of a larger work, and the poet would not have included the best part of his work (such as descriptions of natural scenery) in a prelude. Jacobi theorizes that the surviving text is an abridgement of Vakpati's complete text: the later redactors seem to discarded the parts that were not of interest to poets. This may also explain why the number of verses differs between manuscripts: the largest manuscript has 133 more verses than the shortest one. Jacobi notes that Haripala's commentary on Gaudavaho is titled Haripala-Virachita-Gaudavadha-Sara-Tika ("Commentary on the epitome of Gaudavaho, written by Haripala"). This suggests that the manuscript available to Haripala contained only an abridged version (sāra or epitome) of Gaudavaho. Moriz Winternitz also regards the surviving text as a summary of a longer poem.

N. G. Suru disagrees with Jacobi, stating that several post-Kalidasa poets enjoyed voluminous writing, focusing on quantity over quality. Therefore, it is possible that Vakpati planned to write a very large poem, although he may have not been able to finish it. He may have included the description of natural scenery in the prelude, because he intended to focus on the main theme (the killing of the Gauda king) in the subsequent parts of the poem. Suru states that the different number of verses in various manuscripts may result from preferences of the copyists. Suru further argues that Haripala wrote a commentary on the manuscript with the least number of verses, and he himself admits that he is commenting on an earlier part of Gaudavaho.

The last verse in two manuscripts of Gaudavaho, written in the upajati metre, suggests that the work is finished. Suru regards this verse as an addition by the copyists, noting that it refers to the completion of the katha-pitham (prelude). If it referred to the completion of Gaudavaho, it would be in contradiction with the preceding verse, which states that the story of the king will now be told.

According to the Kashmiri poet Kalhana's Rajatarangini, Yashovarman was defeated by and became a vassal of the Kashmiri king Lalitaditya. Yashovarman's defeat may have prevented Vakpati from completing his work. Indologist A.K. Warder theorizes that the Gaudavaho may have been composed after Yashovarman's defeat against Lalitaditya, as the poem features an "atmosphere of nostalgia" with "bitter verses on good and evil, on the vanity of the present age when success is reserved for mediocrity and jealously withheld from excellence."

== Plot ==
=== Prelude ===
Vakpati invokes several gods in the first 61 verses. He starts with Brahma, and then refers to Vishnu and his incarnations including Narasimha, Varaha, Vamana, Kurma, Mohini, and Krishna. Next, the poet invokes Shiva and his aspects such as Ardhanarishvara. He then refers to Shiva's son Kartikeya, and Shiva's consort Parvati, naming her various aspects including Mahishasura Mardini, Kali, and Chamunda. He further invokes Saraswati, Surya, Shesha, Ganapati, Lakshmi, and Kama, and Ganga.

What is real is made to look unreal and the unreal looks perfectly real, while sometimes the thing is pictured exactly as it stands. Such are the ways of good poets.

— Gaudavaho verse 66

In the next 36 verses, Vakpati talks about poets, their impact, their challenges, the language used by them (Sanskri or Prakrit), their aspirations, and their disappointments.

Vakpati then glorifies his patron Yashovarman, calling him the Lord of the Earth, deifying him as an incarnation of Vishnu. He states that the king of gods - Indra - invites Yashovarman to share his throne. The poet then describes a mythological episode of how Indra cut the wings of the flying mountains. Next, Vakpati talks about Yashovarman's courtesans playing water-sports in the bathing tanks of defeated enemies. He then describes pralaya, the periodic dissolution of the world, stating that its sole survivor - Vishnu - had incarnated as Yashovarman. The next 10 verses describe the pitiful condition of the widows of the enemy kings.

=== Expeditions ===
Vakpati then states that after Yashovarman's coronation ceremony, as soon as the rainy season ended, the king launched a campaign for world conquest. The gods, the celestial nymphs, and the bards celebrated this event. Yashovarman's army comprised four units: infantry, cavalry, chariots, and elephants: Vakpati describes the horses and elephants in more detail.

You strike terror even with these pillars decorated with cloth dyed red, prominently displaying, as it were, circular heaps of flesh (from animals) butchered for your offering.

— Gaudavaho verse 322, addressing the goddess Vindhyavasini

The poet then describes the winter season, stating that Yashovarman marched to the Shona river and then to the Vindhya mountains. There, the Shabara tribals directed him to the temple of the goddess Vindhyavasini. The king worshipped the goddess, and Vakpati describes these ceremonies and the goddess in great detail. He uses various names for the goddess, including Madhavi, Bhairavi, Chandi, Narayani, Shankari, Kali, Shabari, Gauri, and Tapasi. Vakpati then narrates the king's thoughts upon seeing a dead body in the temple precinct. Vakpati continues with poetic descriptions of the summer season, followed by that of the rainy season.

Next, he describes the killing of the Gauda king. The allies of the Gauda king initially deserted him and fled away, but later, they re-grouped and joined him on the battlefield. Yashovarman defeated them in a fierce fight, seized the fleeing Gauda king, and killed him.

Yashovarman then marched along the coast, and defeated the Vanga king. He proceeded to the South, where the southern king cordially submitted before him. His army crossed the Malaya Mountains, and reached the sea shore, where Vali and Ravana once roamed about. Yashovarman then defeated the Parasikas in a fierce battle as part of his world-conquest, just like Raghu had done in the past (a reference to Kalidasa's Raghuvaṃśa). He marched to the western mountain ranges, and collected tribute from the local rulers. Vakpati narrates how the ancient king Pṛthu had leveled the mountains, which had now grown in size.

Vakpati states that Yashovarman then arrived on the banks of the river Narmada, and encamped there. The poet personalizes the river, and describes her love for the royal sage Kartavirya. Next, the king visited the sea shore, and stayed at the site of the churning of the ocean. His army then marched across the desert region of Maru-desha (Marwar).

Vakpati then describes Yashovarman's arrival in the suburbs of the Shrikantha (Thanesar) city, where the ancient king Janamejaya had performed a snake sacrifice ceremony to avenge his father's death. The poet provides a graphic description of the ceremony. The king then moved to Kurukshetra, where he enjoyed water-sports with his lovers in the lake which was the site of the fight between Bhima and Duryodhana. Vakpati alludes to episodes from the Mahabharata, including the fight between Karna and Arjuna.

According to the poet, Yashovarman then visited Ayodhya and built a "palatial temple" there in one day. Vakpati narrates how the gods transported the city of Ayodhya to heaven as requested by the ancient king Harishchandra. After Ayodhya, the king proceeded to the slopes of the Mandara mountain, where the local rich people offered him gifts. His army then proceeded northwards, and visited the Himalayan region, including the vicinity of the Kailasa mountain. Vakpati describes the natural scenery, as seen by the king's army, in detail. He then describes the pitiful state of the kings subjugated by Yashovarman.

=== After the end of expeditions ===
They look beautiful with a pair of their rounded breasts, swelling at the prospect of getting from their lover a close embrace, which look very much like a pair of wheels of the Kamadeva's chariot heading towards their lover.

— Gaudavaho verse 759, describing the king's lovers

Vakpati then describes erotic scenes involving the army soldiers and their wives after the end of the expedition. He then narrates how panegyrists glorified the king using poetic exaggerations and described how the king's lovers undressed before they got into bed with him. Vakpati mentions that now the king focused solely on love-making. The wives of the king of Magadha (or Gauda) were made to wave fly-whisks over the king, like the slave girls, and cried at their plight. The poet then describes the king's love scenes and playful activities with his lovers. Next, he narrates the grooming and make-up activities of these ladies after bath.

=== Autobiography ===
The poet then provides an autobiographical note, stating that he held the title "Kavi-raja" (king of poets), and that poet Kamalayudha highly respected him. He describes his work as "spray particles of poetic nectar churned out from the ocean of Bhavabhuti's works". He enjoyed reading the works of poets such as Bhasa, Jvalanamitra, Kuntideva, Kalidasa, Subandhu, and Harichandra. He also enjoyed reading scritpures, works on grammar and mimamsa, prosody, Bharata's Natya Shastra, Gautama's Nyaya Sutras, lgendary texts (such as the Ramayana and the Mahabharata), and the works of other excellent poets. Vakpati then praises himself, calling his poetic speech "full of sentiment, full of substance, brilliant and solid in thought".

=== Story behind composition ===
Vakpati then describes what led him to compose Gaudavaho. He states that one day, in the assembly, the audience requested him to tell them about king Yashovarman, especially the slaying of the Gauda king. Vakpati praises the king, calling him a manifestation of the god Vishnu.

Men who have acquired great merits look down upon great Lakshmi (the goddess of wealth) as most insignificant, and of no consequence. Hence is Lakshmi's hatred and hostility towards merits, not without reason, of course.

— Gaudavaho verse 922

Vakpati then devotes 150 verses to describe the "dry and insipid worldly life" of his period, venting out his frustrations about sycophancy of courtiers, nepotism, fraud, poverty, stinginess of rich people, lack of respect for the non-wealthy, and general wickedness in the society. The poet then states that in this sordid world, it would be rewarding to hear about king Yashovarman's virtues. He then glorifies the king, narrating how god Shiva tested him by appearing as a lion before him, calling him as an incarnation of Vishnu multiple times, and describing him as a member of the lunar dynasty.

Vakpati states that now "Gaudavaho, a big enterprise" will be narrated. The assembly then disperses to meet the next morning. The poet describes the sunset and the moon-rise. He states that he decided to sleep, finding himself unable to continue narrating the king's exploits because doing so incorrectly would weaken the king's glory. However, he did not get sleep, and used the night to compose 42 verses describing love scenes involving young women applying make-up, couples flirting and drinking wine together, hugging and kissing, enjoyment of sex, and sleep afterwards. He then describes the end of the night and the sunrise.

After waking up and finishing his morning routine, Vakpati prepares to narrate the king's life, describing it as similar to the life of Chanakya. A great assembly of gods, nymphs, men, women, and birds gathers in an open auditorium (as had happened in Bhavabhuti's play Uttararamacarita). As Vakpati starts his narration, there is perfect silence. He states that he is now going to talk about the king's life, and asks the audience to listen.

== Historicity ==
Gaudavaho is prashasti-kavya, aimed at glorifying Vakpati's patron, king Yashovarman. The surviving text of the poem does not contain much historical narrative: it focuses more on mythological episodes, and on other topics found commonly in mahakavyas, such as natural scenery and march of armies.

Historian V. V. Mirashi calls Gaudavaho "mostly a fictionalised piece" that does not name any of the defeated kings, and appears to be modeled on Kalidasa's Raghuvaṃśa and Harishena's panegyric on Samudragupta. That said, Yashovarman's subjugation of the eastern king of Gauda or Magadha appears to be a true event. According to commentator Haripala, as well as several later scholars, the text uses the terms "Magadha king" and "Gauda king" to refer to the same person. According to this theory, during Yashovarman's time, Magadha was a part of Gauda, or vice versa. According to Mirashi, the defeated king was probably Jivitagupta II, the last known ruler of the Later Gupta dynasty. An inscription found at Nalanda in Magadha describes Yashovarman as a famous king who destroyed all his enemies with his sword. Shyam Manohar Mishra, relying on Jain texts, believes that the kings of Gauda and Magadha were two different persons, and the Gauda king was named Dharma. Amita Bhattacharya notes that in the poem, learned people request Vakpati to narrate the killing of "the lord of the Magadhas" and Vakpati's reply refers to "the king of the Gaudas". This suggests that the poet identified the king of Gauda with the king of Magadha. Bhattacharya identifies the defeated king as Vishnugupta, the father of Jivitagupta II, and states that the Gauda region may have been a part of the Later Gupta kingdom at the time.
