= Vajrayudha (disambiguation) =

The vajrayudha or vajra is a Hindu and Buddhist mythological and ritual weapon.

Vajrayudha may also refer to:

- Vajrayudha, another name of the Hindu god Indra, who carries the vajra weapon
- Vajrayudha, ruler of the Ayudha dynasty from 770 to 783
- Vajrayudha (film), a 1992 Indian action film
