= Bhoja (Varman dynasty) =

8th century Indian king

King of Kannauj
- Reign: ? – 770
- Predecessor: Dunduka
- Successor: Vajrayudha
- Dynasty: Varman
- Father: Dunduka
- Mother: Padma
- Religion: Jainism

Bhoja was the King of Kannauj in the late 8th century CE.

His parents were Dunduka and Padma, Dunduka's queen. Dunduka made several futile attempts to kill Bhoja. Later, Bhoja killed Dunduka for the throne in his royal court.

After killing his father, Bhoja ascended the throne with the favour and support of Dunduka's subjects and high officials. Bhoja, like his father Dunduka and grandfather Āma, became a parama Jaina. He fought off an invasion by an invading Muslim army. He either retired as a king after a short rule, or his kingdom was annexed by the Ayudhas, who established a new dynasty, or he was deposed by the Pratiharas.
