= Varman dynasty (Kannauj) =

Former dynasty of Kannauj (725–770)

- c. 725–c. 770
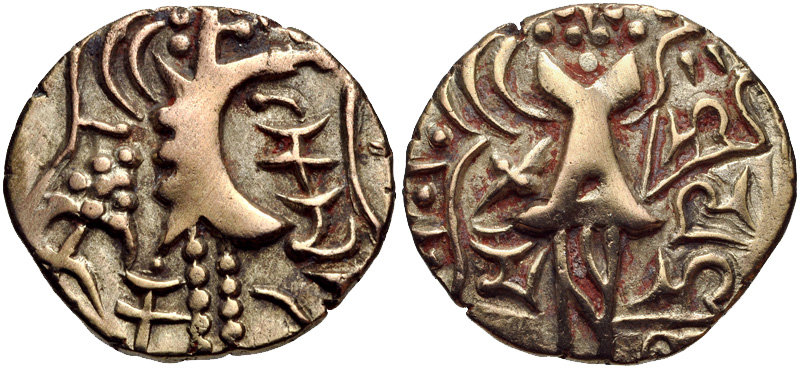
- Possible coinage of Yashovarman. Obverse: abstract Kushan-style king standing, Kidara monogram to inner right. Reverse: Abstract Ardoxsho seated facing, Brahmi script legend “Sri Yasova” to right, “rma” to left.

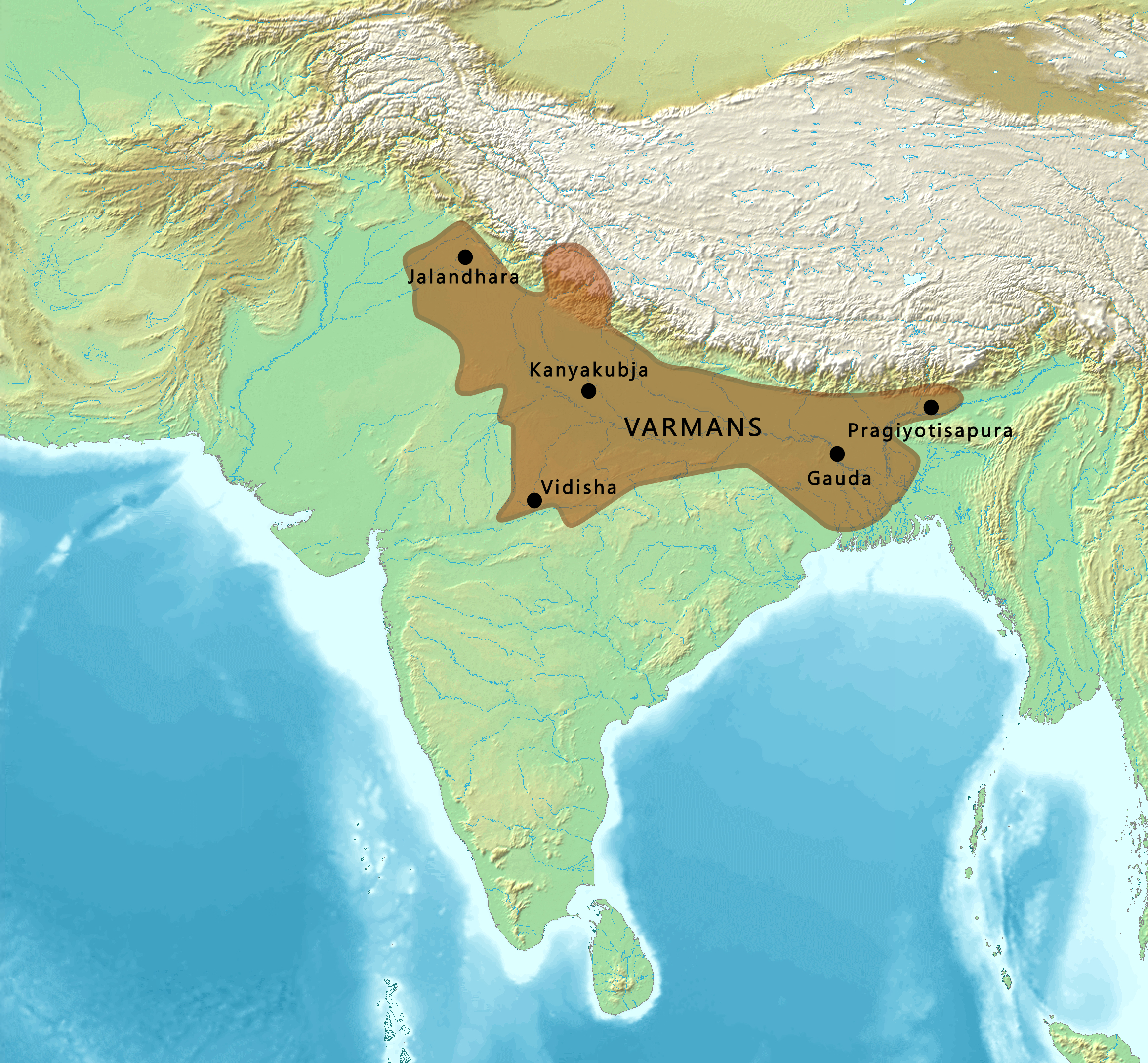
- Map of the Varman territory at the time of Yashovarman, circa 700 CE.
- Capital: Kannauj
- Religion: Jainism, Hinduism
- Government: Monarchy
- Maharajadhiraja
  - c. 725–c. 752: Yashovarman
  - ?–c. 770: Bhoja
- History
  - Established: c. 725
  - Disestablished: c. 770
Preceded by
Later Gupta dynasty
Succeeded by
Ayudha dynasty
Pala Empire
Pratihara dynasty
- Today part of: India, Bangladesh

The Varman dynasty was a dynasty that ruled from the mid 7th century to the late 8th century.

== History ==
=== Establishment ===
The city of Kannauj had previously been ruled by emperor Harshavardhana, who died without an heir and thus created a power vacuum. This lasted for around a century before Yashovarman emerged as its ruler. Alexander Cunningham, an archaeologist of the British Raj period, speculated on possible rulers of Kannauj during the period between Harsha and Yashovarman but there is little evidence to support his claims. Much of information on him is derived from the Gaudavaho (Slaying of the king of Gauda), a Prakrit-language poem written by his court poet Vakpati. According to the Jain chronicles, Yashovarman had a son named Āma, who succeeded him as the king of Kannauj during 749-753 CE.

=== Expansion ===
The dynasty reached its greatest extent and zenith of prosperity only under its founder, Yashovarman. The Gaudavaho depicts Yashovarman as conquering large swathes of northern India — including Bihar, Bengal, the western Deccan, Indus Valley and Kashmir — before returning in triumph to Kannauj. However, Kalhana, a Kashmiri court chronicler who lived around the 12th century CE, gives a very different story in his Rajatarangini, depicting Yashovarman as a ruler who was among those defeated by Lalitaditya Muktapida, a very powerful Karkota ruler of Kashmir.

Although R. C. Majumdar is among those who are wary of the ancient accounts of conquests, he believes that Yashovarman was "unquestionably the most powerful king [in the region] about this time."

=== Decline ===
Yashovarman's successors did not expand the kingdom and were all weak kings, who did not pay much attention to administration. They are considered as unsuccessful rulers. Āma, Dunduka, and Bhoja are considered as insignificant rulers, who achieved nothing of importance and reigned for 15–20 years. The last king, Bhoja was probably defeated by the Ayudhas, who established a new dynasty.

== List of rulers ==
- Suryavarman (c. 710-725 CE), whose daughter Vasati married the Panduvamshi king Harshagupta of Dakshina Kosala.
- Yashovarman (c. 725–752 CE), founder of dynasty
- Āma
- Dunduka
- Bhoja (ruled till 770 CE), last ruler of dynasty

== Notes ==
It’s a short lasting dynasty

== Sources ==
- Chopra, Pran Nath (2003), A Comprehensive History of Ancient India, Sterling Publishers, ISBN 978-81-207-2503-4
- Eraly, Abraham (2011), The First Spring: The Golden Age of India, Penguin Books India, ISBN 9780670084784
- Majumdar, Ramesh Chandra (2003) [1952], Ancient India (Reprinted ed.), Motilal Banarsidass, ISBN 9788120804364
- Mishra, Shyam Manohar (1977). Yaśovarman of Kanauj. Abhinav. OCLC 5782454.
- Tripathi, Ramashandra (1989), History of Kanauj: To the Moslem Conquest (Reprinted ed.), Motilal Banarsidass, ISBN 9788120804043
