= Āma =

Medieval Indian king

King of Kanauj
- Reign: mid 8th century CE
- Predecessor: Yashovarman
- Successor: Dunduka
- Issue: Dunduka, Ratnaganga
- Dynasty: Varman
- Father: Yashovarman
- Mother: Suyasha (also called Yashodevi)
- Religion: Jainism

Āma was a medieval Indian king who ruled the Kingdom of Kannauj and surrounding areas during the 8th and the 9th centuries. According to the Jain chronicles, he was the son and successor of Yashovarman.

== Jain account ==
The Jain chronicle Bappabhatti-Suri-Charita, a biography of the Jain ascetic Bappabhattisuri, states Yashovarman's chief queen Suyasha gave birth to Āma during her exile at Ramasainya. Also called Yashodevi, the queen was exiled because of a conspiracy by another queen.

Āma was brought up by the Jain monk Siddhasena at Modherakapura, but he and his mother were later restored to their royal positions. As a prince, Āma was a spendthrift, so Yashovarman asked him to be frugal. This annoyed Āma, who returned to Modherakapura. According to the Prabandha Kosha, when Yashovarman fell ill towards the end of his life, he recalled Āma to Kannauj and appointed him as the new king. The Prabhavaka Charita and Prabandha Kosha suggest that Āma ascended the throne during 749-753 CE (807-811 VS).

According to Prabhavaka-Charita, Āma once caught a cobra (naga) with a radiant jewel on its head. Because of this, the Jain monk Bappabhattisuri gave him the title "Nagavaloka".

Āma subdued the kings Samudrasena of Rajagriha (Magadha) and Dharma of Gauda. According to Prabandha Kosha, the poet Vakpati composed Madra-Mahi-Vijaya ("the conquest of Madra") during his reign; Prabhavaka Charita calls the text Madhu-Matha-Vijaya instead.

Āma lost control of Kannauj, and moved to Gopagiri (modern Gwalior). He was inclined towards Jainism. The Prabandha Kosha states that he built a shrine of Mahavira in Gopagiri (modern Gwalior). Under Jain influence, he abdicated the throne in favour of his son Dunduka. He retired to Magadha-tirtha, where he died in 832-833 CE (890 VS).

Dunduka was killed by his son Bhoja. There is no information about Bhoja's successors.

== Skanda Purana account ==
According to the Skanda Purana, Āma was a powerful king of Kanyakubja (Kannauj). During his reign, the Vaishnavites of his kingdom converted to Buddhism under the influence of a Buddhist monk, but re-converted to Vaishnavism sometime later. He had a daughter named Ratnaganga, who married his former feudatory Kumarapala. Kumarapala originally ruled in the Punjab region, but later became the ruler of Moharapura.

== Historicity ==
The Jain chroniclers' claim that Āma was the son and successor of Yashovarman seems to be historically accurate. No other king is known to have ruled at Kannauj in mid-8th century CE, until the advent of the Ayudha dynasty in the last quarter of that century.

The Jain accounts of Āma's subjugation of Samudrasena and Dharma contain mythical elements, but appear to be based on historical events. These two regions were part of Yashovarman's territory, and their rulers may have declared independence following Yashovarman's defeat against Lalitaditya Muktapida, or following his death. The identity of Samudrasena is not certain. Some historians have identified Dharma with the Pala king Dharmapala, although Dharmapala conquered Kannauj during the reign of the later Ayudha kings. According to historian Shyam Manohar Mishra, Āma probably defeated Dharmapala before the Palas became powerful, but ultimately, Dharmapala emerged victorious. According to D. C. Sircar, Āma probably fought with an earlier Pala king, whom the Jain chroniclers may have confused with Dharmapala.

According to Vakpati himself, he composed Madhu-Matha-Vijaya before he wrote Gaudavaho during Yashovarman's reign. Thus, the Prabhavaka Charita claim of Madhu-Matha-Vijaya having been composed during Āma's reign is historically inaccurate. The correct name of the text composed during Āma's reign appears to be Madra-Mahi-Vijaya ("victory over Madra region"). The name suggests that Āma conquered the Madra region, which Lalitaditya is also said to have conquered. Shyam Manohar Mishra theorizes that Lalitaditya's successors may have lost the area to Āma, until Jayapida recaptured it.

Mishra interprets Āma's association with Gopagiri or Gopalagiri (Gwalior) during the last years of his reign as follows: Āma lost control of his kingdom during the Tripartite Struggle for his capital Kannauj between the Palas, the Pratiharas and the Rashtrakutas. As a result, he had to move to Gwalior, where he probably ruled as a vassal.

=== Identification with Nagabhata II ===
The Jain chronicles mention Nagavaloka as an epithet of Āma. Based on the similarity of "Nagavaloka" to "Nagabhata", several earlier historians identified Āma with the Pratihara king Nagabhata II. These historians include F. Kielhorn, G. H. Ojha, D. R. Bhandarkar, K. M. Munshi, Dasharatha Sharma and B. N. Puri.

This identification is based on the following points:

- Both the kings ruled in the first half of the ninth century, and died around 833 CE
- Both of them bore the title Nagavaloka.
- Both had grandsons named Bhoja
- Both were rivals of the king Dharma[pala] of Gauda

Shyam Manohar Mishra (1977) disagrees with this theory based on the following arguments:

- The Jain chronicles unanimously describe Āma as the son of Yashovarman, while Nagabhata II was the son of Vatsaraja
- According to the Jain chronicles, Āma ascended the throne around 750 CE, while Nagabhata II ascended the throne nearly half a century later.
- No historical records mention Āma and Nagabhata II as the same person.
- The title Nagavaloka was not exclusive to Nagabhata II; other kings (such as Nagabhata I) also bore it
- Jain accounts state that Āma patronized the poet Vakpati and the Jain monk Bappabhattisuri: these two figures are not associated with Nagabhata II
- The son and successor of Āma was Dunduka, but the son and successor of Nagabhata II was Ramabhadra
- According to the Jain accounts, Āma's grandson Bhoja was an insignificant Jain king who killed his father. On the other hand, Nagabhata's grandson Bhoja was an important king and a Vaishnavite.

=== Other identifications ===
In the first half of the 9th century CE, Kannauj was ruled by a family of rulers whose name ended in -ayudha. S. Krishnaswami Aiyangar theorized that Vajrayudha and Indrayudha were alternative names of Āma. But this theory is contradicted by the Jain accounts.

Historian Buddha Prakash identified Āma with Avantivarman, a king mentioned in an inscription found at Ranod near Gwalior. But there is no concrete evidence to support this theory.
