= Bappabhattisuri =

8th century CE Indian Jain ascetic

Vādikavi Ācārya Bappabhattisuri Mahārāja Sāheb

Personal life
- Born: Surpal; 743 CE Duva, Banaskantha, Gujarat, India
- Died: 838 CE
- Parents: Bappa (father); Bhatti (mother)
- Known for: Pieces of literature such as Anubhuta Siddha Sarasvatī Stava, and reforms in iconography of Tirthankara idols belonging to the Śvetāmbara sect
- Other name: Bhadrakīrti

Religious life
- Religion: Jainism
- Sect: Śvetāmbara; Modha Gaccha
- Initiation: 750 CE by Acharya Siddhasenasuri

Religious career
- Predecessor: Acharya Siddhasenasuri

Vādikavi Ācārya Bappabhattisuri Mahārāja Sāheb was a Śvetāmbara Jain ascetic in the 8th century CE. He was an eminent poet, philosopher, reformer, researcher, and a child prodigy. Apart from his literary contributions, he is best known for his scriptural debates and the reforms he brought about in the iconography of Tirthankara idols sculpted and owned by the Śvetāmbara sect of Jainism.

== Birth and early life ==
He was born as Surapala to Bappa (father) and Bhatti (mother) belonging to an Oswal family in the year 743 CE in a small village known as Duva in the present-day Banaskantha district in Gujarat.

== Initiation ==
Acharya Siddhasenasuri was at a temple of Jivantasvami Neminatha near Duva when he saw a young Surapala visiting the temple. He recalled a dream he saw the previous night of a young lion springing upon a table at the exact place Surapala was standing at.

Surapala's parents then met Siddhasenasuri and requested his son be initiated into the Chaturvidha Sangha. The preceptor agreed and initiated him and named him Muni Bappabhatti, in respect to and memory of Surapala's parents.

== Ascetic life ==
=== Early ascetic life ===
As a young ascetic, he learned scriptures and gained knowledge of reasoning and logic from his preceptor Siddhasenasuri, who is himself considered to have had been a highly qualified and learned monk. Bappabhatti is said to have mastered the 72 arts. Legend also says that his preceptor gave him a Saraswati mantra, by chanting which, he was blessed by demi-goddess Saraswati herself.

=== Consecration as an Ācārya ===
He is one of the very few ascetics who attained the position of an Ācārya in the Chaturvidha Sangha of Jainism in just 4 years after initiation as a Jain monk. At 11 years of age, he was consecrated as an "acharya" and become one of the youngest ascetics to ever attain the title. He was then renamed as Bappabhattisuri.

After the death of his preceptor, he spent most of his ascetic life in East India and North India in Mathura, West Bengal, Kannauj and other North-Indian towns and villages. Accounts of his influence of King Ama of Kannauj and ascetics and kings of Mathura are most popular.

=== Influence on King Āma ===
Once, Bappabhattisuri was wandering in Kannauj when it started raining heavily. Since Jain monks do not touch unboiled water, he halted at a temple, waiting for the rain to stop. At the same time, Prince Āma, the son of Yashovarman, the king of Kannauj also entered the temple. The prince stumbled upon a praśasti (transl. inscription) in the temple. He requested Bappabhattisuri to explain him the meaning of the same. The latter explained it in a great depth and it impressed the prince. He accompanied Bappabhattisuri to an upashraya. He developed deep reverence for Bappabhattisuri. The prince then promised him half of his kingdom after he became a king. However, Bappabhattisuri explained to him, the vow of non-possession that Jain monks take.

After he returned to Kannauj, his father died and he was proclaimed as the king. He then invited Bappabhattisuri to pay homage and respect to him. When Bappabhattisuri arrived, Āma requested him to sit on his throne as a mark of respect. However, seeing it as inappropriate for a Jain monk, Bappabhattisuri respectfully denied the offer. However, he stayed there for a while and impressed everyone in the court with his wisdom by solving riddles throws at him by the king.

Some other men in the king's court were jealous of him and tried turning the king against Bappabhattisuri. The king behaved differently and when Bappabhattisuri realized this, he decided to leave. He went towards West Bengal where King Dharmaraja ruled. The latter was a foe of King Āma, but acknowledged the wisdom of Bappabhattisuri, so he heartily welcomed him. When Āma repented for his ill behavior, he tried finding whereabouts of Bappabhattisuri. After finding that he was in Dharmaraja's kingdom, Āma went there to request him to come back. Bappabhattisuri complied and went back to Kannauj. Bappabhattisuri is then said to have had been the spiritual mentor to King Āma.

=== Śāstrārtha with Buddhist scholar Vardhana Kunjara ===
Vardhana Kunjara, a popular Buddhist scholar and orator was living in King Dharmaraja's kingdom at that time. The latter thought of a way to take revenge on Āma by inviting Bappabhattisuri for a debate with Vardhana Kunjara. The condition of the debate was that the king of the defeated debater's kingdom would forfeit the kingdom to the king of the victorious' kingdom. The debate went on for six months, after which Vardhana Kunjara lost. Āma won Dharmaraja's kingdom. However, at Bappabhattisuri's request, the kingdom was given back to Dharmaraja, who then adopted Jainism.

== Dispute with Digambaras ==
=== Pilgrimage to Girnar ===
King Āma organized a sangha (pilgrimage) to Girnar Jain temples. He vowed to fast until he worshipped the idol of Neminatha atop the hill. Before they reached Khambhat, he felt hungry. Bappabhattisuri is said to have invoked demi-goddess Ambika who brought the idol of Neminatha from atop the hill for the king to worship and break his fast. The sangha first went to Palitana temples and then began moving towards Girnar Jain temples. As they reached the foothills of Mount Girnar, they were prevented from climbing the hill by Digambaras. The latter believed that the Digambara sect was the true Jain sangha and that the Śvetāmbara sect had emerged later. A sangha of 11 Digambara kings with heavy artillery and cavalry were ready to engage into a battle to establish ownership over the shrine atop the mountain. King Āma was furious at this and called for a war between him and the 11 Digambara kings. However, before things heated up, Bappabhattisuri calmed them and called for peace between the two sects. The Digambara monks also had faith in Jain principles, so they agreed with him.

=== Debate with Digambaras ===
Bappabhattisuri suggested to ask demi-goddess Ambika about the true ownership of the shrine atop the mountain. He further suggested that the debate take place in the following way — each sect would send a girl to the opposing sect and the opposing sect would make her speak. Śvetāmbaras sent a young girl, but the Digambaras failed to make her speak after trying for 36 hours. Then, Digambaras sent a young girl to the opposing side. Just as Bappabhattisuri looked at her, and blessed her by raising his hand and showing his palm, demi-goddess Ambika spoke through her the following words and declared about the ownership of the pilgrimage site: -

In Prakrit: -

इक्को वि नमुक्कारो, जिणवर-वसहस्स वद्धमाणस्स,
संसार-सागराओ, तारेइ नरं व नारिं वा।

Transliteration in English: -

Ikko Vi Namukkāro, Jinavara – Vasahassa Vaddhamānassa,
Sansāra-Sāgarao, Tārei Naram Va Nārim Vā.

Translation in English: -

Even one salutation done perfectly to Vardhamana Mahavira,
Will carry a man or a woman across the ocean of worldly existence.

Hearing this hymn in Prakrit, everyone was confused, so a Digambara king politely asked Bappabhattisuri about the meaning of this hymn. He said that Śvetāmbaras believe that men, women, and even impotent eunuchs could attain salvation, and that is strictly in opposition to the Digambara ideology who believe that only men could attain salvation as propagated by Sivabhuti. Since Śvetāmbaras made the girl speak, they emerged victorious and ascended the hill to complete their pilgrimage. The shrine atop the mountain has since been completely owned by Śvetāmbaras alone. Since then and even today, Digambaras do not worship the idol at the said shrine. It is said that after these lines, the Śvetāmbara crowd spoke the following words in unison: -

Ujjiinta Sela – Sihare, Dikkha Nanam Nisihia Jassa,
Tam Dhamma – Cakka – Vattim, Arittha Nemim Namamsami

The meaning of the above words: -

I worship Arishtanemi, the all-knowing monarch, who received the initiation, perfect knowledge (kevala-jnäna) and liberation (moksha) on the summit of mount Girnara

=== Reforms in iconography of Tirthankara idols owned by the Śvetāmbara sect ===
Unlike Digambara scriptures, the Śvetāmbara canon endorses and accepts both Sthavirakalpi (clothed) and Jinakalpi (naked) ascetics as described in the Ācārāṅga Sūtra and the Sutrakritanga Sutra. Followers of Digambara sect worship only the liberated state of the Tirthankaras, while followers of the Śvetāmbara sect worship all stages of a Tirthankara's life. The Śvetāmbara canon and subsequently written non-canonical scriptures that describe the canon in greater detail also describe that the liberated state of a Tirthankara has no possessions (such idols are, therefore, naked), while the worldly state of a Tirthankara can be decorated and shown devotion towards by 'using expensive materials of decoration' (such idols are, therefore, clothed). This is also seen as in the case of Jivantasvami idols that are only worshipped by the Śvetāmbara sect and not by the Digambara sect. Ear jewellery is a common way of identifying ancient Śvetāmbara idols which are now in the possession of their Digambara counterparts. Followers of the Śvetāmbara sect, therefore, worshipped both clothed and nude idols of Tirthankaras before disputes between them and Digambaras arose.

Before this incident at Girnar, Śvetāmbaras worshipped clothed and naked idols of the Tirthankaras. However, after this incident, to avoid future issues over ownership of idols and temples, Bappabhattisuri called upon all the Śvetāmbara acharyas and they unanimously mandated that all idols sculpted by the Śvetāmbara sect since then, would be clothed with a waistband (kandora) and a piece of cloth (kachhota) just beneath the folded legs of a Tirthankara idol. With time, other additions such as human-like eyes, and bhaala-tilak (transl. a mark at the center of the forehead) were made to mark a clear distinction between newer Śvetāmbara idols and Digambara idols.

== Literary contributions ==
It is said that he wrote over 52 prabandhas (transl. epic poems) such as Taragana. However, of those, only two are available now, namely Anubhuta Siddha Sarasvatī Stava and Chaturvinshati Stuti. The rest are considered to be lost.

== Death and legacy ==
At the age of 95, he performed Santhara and died. Several medieval Śvetāmbara texts describe him and his ascetic life in detail. Some biographical texts are dedicated solely to him. Some of the texts that mention him are as follows: -

1. Bappabhattisuri Caritra - A 1235 CE non-canonical Śvetāmbara text written in Maharashtri Prakrit.
2. Prabhavakacarita - A 1278 CE text written by Acharya Prabhācandrasuri.
3. Aamprabandha
4. Prabandha-Chintamani
5. Kalpapradeep - A 1333 CE non-canonical Śvetāmbara text written by the author of Vividha Tirtha Kalpa, Acharya Jinaprabhasuri of Kharatara Gaccha.
6. Prabandha-kosa - A 1349 CE Śvetāmbara text written by Acharya Rajshekharsuri.
7. Puratan-Prabandha-Sangraha - A 1472 CE Śvetāmbara text which is a compilation of several older texts.
8. Shatrunjaya-Kalpavritti - A 1462 CE text written by Shubhashila Gani.
9. Upadesharatnakara - A 15th century CE text written by Acharya Munisundarsuri of Tapa Gaccha.
10. Panchashati-Prabodha-Sambandha - A 1465 CE text written by Subhashila Gani.

He was also awarded with several titles such as — Vadikunjara Kesari, Bala-Brahmachari, Gajavara, Rajpujita, and Vadikavi.

== See also ==
- Ratnaprabhasuri
- Daulatsagarsuri
- Vimalsuri

== Sources ==
- Rama Shankar Tripathi (1964). History of Kanauj: To the Moslem Conquest. Motilal Banarsidass. ISBN 978-81-208-0478-4.
- Shyam Manohar Mishra (1977). Yaśovarman of Kanauj. Abhinav. OCLC 5782454.
