= Bhavabhuti =

Sanskrit scholar, poet, and playwright in 8th-century India

Poet of the Karunā Rasa Bhavabhuti भवभूति
- Born: Srikantha Nilakantha c. 680 CE; Padmapura village, Vidarbha region, Chalukya Dynasty (present-day Maharashtra, India)
- Died: c. 750 – c. 760 CE; Most likely Vidarbha region, Rashtrakuta Empire
- Occupation: ·Poet ·Playwright
- Writing career
- Pen name: Bhavabhuti; Srikantha; Srikantha Audumbara; Udumbara; Udumbara Brahmin
- Language: Sanskrit
- Period: c. 700 – c. 760 CE
- Genre: Sanskrit drama
- Notable works: Mahaviracharita; Malatimadhava Uttararamacharita
- Predecessor Kalidasa

Bhavabhūti (born Śrīkaṇṭha Nīlakaṇṭha; Devanagari: भवभूति; c. 680-c. 750 – c. 760 CE) was a classical Sanskrit scholar, poet, and playwright of eighth-century India. He is considered a key successor to Kalidasa and is often regarded as matching his literary stature. His best known work Uttararamacarita (translated as The Later Deeds of Rama), earned him the title "Poet of the Karunā Rasa".

== Background ==
Bhavabhuti was born in Padmapura, Aamgaon, at Gondia district, in Maharashtra. He was born in a Audumbar/Udumbar Brahmin family of scholars. He is described as a scion of the Yāyāvara family, bearing the surname Udumbara. His Kāshyapa brahmin ancestors adhered to the Black Yajurveda and kept the five sacred fire.

His real name was Srikantha Nilakantha, and he was the son of Nilakantha and Jatukarni. He received his education at 'Padmapawaya', a place some 42 km South-West of Gwalior. Dayananidhi Paramahansa is known to be his guru. He composed his historical plays at 'Kalpi', a place on banks of river Yamuna.

He is believed to have been the court poet of king Yashovarman of Kannauj. Kalhana, the 12th-century historian, places him in the entourage of the king, who was defeated by Lalitaditya Muktapida, king of Kashmir, in 736 AD.

== Malatimadhava ==
The play is set in the city of Padmavati. The king desires that his minister's daughter Malati marry a youth called Nandana. Malati is in love with Madhava ever since she saw him and drew his portrait. Madhava reciprocates, and draws a portrait of her in turn. Malati suspects her father's motives in falling in with the King's plans for her. A side plot involves the lovers' friends Makaranda and Madayantika. The latter is attacked by a tiger, and Makaranda rescues her, getting wounded in the process.

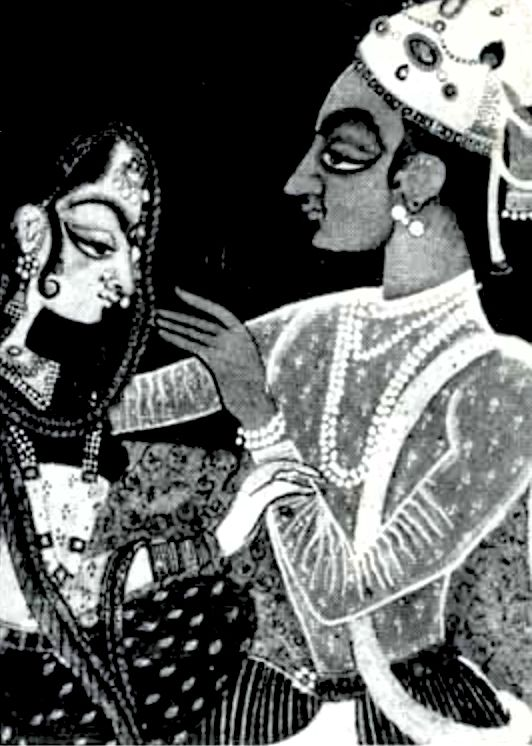
Mālatī and Mādhava from Bhavabhūti’s Mālatīmādhava, shown in a c. 17th–18th century pigment pntg.

After numerous travails, all ends well, with the two couples uniting. According to the renowned Sanskritist Daniel H.H. Ingalls, the Malatimadhava is a work that combines love and horror with a felicity never again equaled in Sanskrit literature. During the period of the 14th century CE, Jagaddhara wrote a commentary on Bhavabhūti’s Sanskrit drama Malatimadhava.

== Indebtedness to Kautilya and Arthashastra ==
According to Dasharatha Sharma, the dramatists Kalidasa and Bhavabhuti utilized the Arthashastra of Kautilya while composing their famous works. Kalidasa is indebted to Kautilya's Arthashastra for material in the Raghuvamsa. Similarly, Bhavabhuti utilizes words and ideas from the Arthashastra in the Malatimadhava and the Mahaviracharita. There is indeed a striking resemblance between the methods advocated by Ravana's minister, Malayavana and the policies suggested by Kautilya in the Arthashastra.

== Bhavabhuti's native place ==
On the basis of Bhavbhuti's literature, it is said that he was born at Padmapura Village in Amgaon Tahsil of Gondia District of Maharashtra.

In this present era, local people around Padampura are trying to keep memories of Bhavbhuti's ancient existence alive with them. Late shri Laxmanrao Mankar Guruji named his education society as "Bhavbhuti Education Society" in 1950. Yashodabai Rahile founded "Bhavbhuti Mandal" (community) in 1996.

Historian & Principal Mr O. C. Patle has published a book, "भवभूति अब गीतों में" (Bhavabhuti, now in his songs), he also has published some audio CDs and cassettes to keep the legend's memories alive.

"Bhavabhuti Ranga Mandir" has also been constructed at Gondia Town in the Honour of Poet Bhavabhuti.

State's local TV channel, Sahyadri and E TV Marathi telecasts some documentaries on the life of this great poet. People and some non-profit groups have erected a few statues in the region where the poet was there once.

== Literary works ==
- Mahaviracharita (The story of the highly courageous one), depicting the early life of Rama
- Malatimadhava, a play based on the romance of Malati and Madhava
- Uttararamacarita (The story of Rama's later life), depicts Rama's coronation, the abandonment of Sita, and their reunion
