= Dunduka =

King of Kanauj
- Reign: 8th century CE
- Predecessor: Āma
- Successor: Bhoja
- Spouse: Padma
- Issue: Bhoja
- Father: Āma
- Mother: ?
- Religion: Jainism

Dunduka was a king of the state of Kannauj in North India during the early 8th century CE.

== Early life ==
Dunduka was the son and successor of Āma, the king of Kannauj and surrounding areas during the late 8th century CE. Āma, his father, had lost control of Kannauj, and moved to Gopagiri (modern Gwalior). Being under Jain influence, Āma abdicated the throne in favour of Dunduka.

== Reign ==
Dunduka was an immoral and cruel person, who was the ruler of a small and reduced territory. He did not take any interest in his royal duties and neglected his queen Padma. He indulged in debauchery and was pleasure-loving. He is described as "immoral" in the Gaudavaho as well. He even made several futile attempts to kill his own son, Bhoja, who was born to Padma. Later, Dunduka was killed by his son Bhoja (not to be confused with Mihira Bhoja), for the throne.

He is considered as an unsuccessful ruler. Āma, his father, he himself, and his son Bhoja are considered as insignificant rulers, who achieved nothing important and reigned for a brief period of 15-20 years. There is no information about Bhoja's successors.

== Religion ==
Dunduka was a follower of Jainism and followed the monk Trivarga.
