= Hasmukh Dhirajlal Sankalia =

Indian archaeologist (1908–1989)

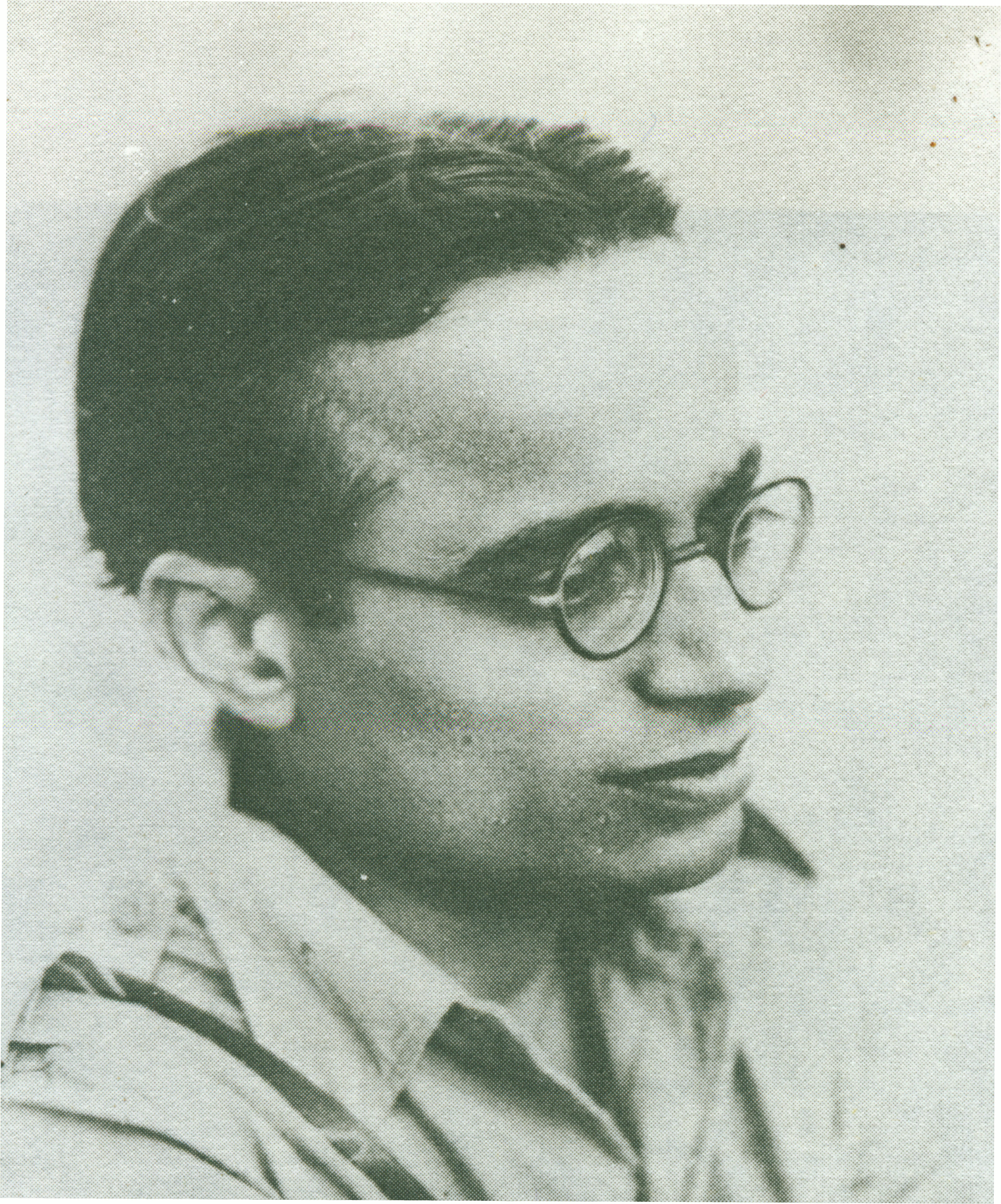
- Born: 10 December 1908; Bombay, British India
- Died: 28 January 1989 (aged 80); Pune, India
- Education: University of Bombay; London University
- Known for: Prehistoric discoveries in India
- Scientific career
- Fields: Archaeology

Hasmukh Dhirajlal Sankalia (10 December 1908 – 28 January 1989) was an Indian Sanskrit scholar and archaeologist specialising in proto- and ancient Indian history. He was also Professor Emeritus of Archaeology at the Deccan College. He is considered as a pioneer of archaeological excavation techniques in India, and made several significant discoveries. Sankalia received the Ranjitram Suvarna Chandrak award in 1966 and the Padma Bhushan in 1974.

== Early life and education ==
Sankalia was born in Mumbai into a family of lawyers hailing from Gujarat. A frail infant, he was not expected to survive.

At fifteen, Sankalia read the Gujarati translation of Lokmanya Tilak's The Arctic Home in the Vedas. Although he understood little of the book, he was determined to "do something to know about the Aryans in India". To this end, Sankalia decided to emulate Tilak and study Sanskrit and mathematics. He received a B.A. degree in Sanskrit, and received the Chimanlal Ranglal Prize. Sankalia made Indian prehistory his life's work, and never lost sight of the origin of the Indo-Aryan peoples. (1962c: 125; 1963a: 279–281; 1974: 553–559; 1978a: 79, etc.). He studied English, which introduced him to textual criticism (p. 7), and wrote an article on Kundamala and the Uttararamacarita in which he convincingly proved that Dinnaga (author of the former) influenced Bhavabhuti (author of the latter). Bengali scholar K. K. Dutt arrived at similar conclusion independently of Sankalia.

Sankalia studied ancient Indian history for his M. A. degree at the new Indian Historical Research Institute (now the Heras Institute), and worked on the ancient university at Nalanda for his M.A. dissertation. His dissertation included chapters on history, art and architecture, iconography and the influence of the Nalanda school of art on Greater India (particularly Java). Sankalia visited a number of sites, and studied Buddhism with B. Bhattacharya (p. 10). These studies led to his later study of Gujarat. He passed the LLB examinations at the request of his father and uncle (who were both lawyers), and was expected to follow them (cf. pp. 10, 13, 28). However, Sankalia decided to go to England for his doctoral degree. He wrote an essay, "Caitya caves in the Bombay Presidency", which earned the Bhagwan Lal Indraji prize.

=== Personal life ===
Sankalia captained a cricket team on College Day. He also enjoyed kite-flying and gardening.

== In London ==
Sankalia left for England, and enrolled at the University of London for his PhD on the archaeology of Gujarat. He studied under Bernard Ashmole (Roman classical archaeology), Sidney Smith (Sumerian language), K. de B. Codrington (museology), F. J. Richards (Indian archaeology) and R. E. M. Wheeler (field archaeology) (p. 18).

From Richards, Sankalia learnt geography, geology, anthropology, ethnography and toponymy. He focused on the latter, applying it to inscriptions in Gujarat and elsewhere (Sankalia 1942a; 1984). Sankalia encouraged his students to pursue toponymy, opening a new field in Indian archaeology.

Wheeler, who was excavating at the site of Maiden Castle, Dorset and had perfected his field techniques (begun in 1921), was a significant influence. He lectured on field techniques, in addition to providing practical training. Sankalia said about Wheeler's training, "The training was brief, lasting just about a month or so, but it was of immense importance for my future career. I learnt here, not only what was stratigraphical digging and drawing a section and three-dimensional recording of finds [...] but was also made aware of the necessity of minute-to-minute supervision of the trench under one's charge for [...] at any moment the layer might change and [which should] be noted as early as possible" (pp. 26–27). Sankalia (cf. pp. 112 ff.; 1938; and his popular articles), influenced by Wheeler, was a proponent of popular archaeology.

== Deccan College ==
After returning to India, Sankalia joined Deccan College in 1939 as a professor of proto- and ancient Indian history and began systematic surveys of the monuments in and around Pune with his students. These yielded papers on the megaliths of Bhavsari and the Yadava-period Temple of Pur. At the request of Archaeological Survey of India director general K. N. Dikshit, Sankalia undertook explorations in Gujarat to test Bruce Foote's hypothesis of a hiatus between the Lower Palaeolithic and Neolithic phases; this made him into a prehistorian.

He also conducted other expeditions in Gujarat. During his second expedition, Sankalia found the first human Stone Age skeleton. The Mesolithic site of Langhnaj was excavated stratigraphically. F. E. Zeuner, an authority on environmental archaeology, was invited by Wheeler to interpret the palaeoclimate of Gujarat. Sankalia was profoundly influenced by Zeuner, from whom he learnt geochronology, geology, the stratigraphy of geological deposits and pluvial and inter-pluvial mechanics.

== Palaeolithic finds in the Deccan ==
Sankalia excavated the Kolhapur site in 1945–46 with M. G. Dikshit (Sankalia and Dikshit 1952). Before the excavation, his detailed surveys of the banks of the Godavari River and its tributaries revealed a flake-tool industry. These findings were also observed in a stratigraphical deposit at Gangapur (Gangawadi), near Nasik, where flakes, cleavers and hand axes were discovered. This developed industry, as later research proved, was part of the Middle Palaeolithic. Sankalia's explorations in the Pravara River valley (at Nevasa) yielded palaeolithic industries and animal fossils.

== Nasik–Jorwe ==
The occurrence of Northern Black Polished Ware at Nasik (mentioned in the Puranas and traditional tales), reported to Sankalia by M. N. Deshpande, made him anxious to unearth evidence correlating to the Early Historical Period and (if possible) unearth pre- and proto-historic cultures. The excavation was successfully carried out.

== Maheshwar–Navdatoli ==
Sankalia's success at Nasik–Jorwe inspired him to excavate the site at Maheshwar (the Mahishmati of the Haihayas, as described in the Puranas) to prove the tradition's historicity. The excavation was carried out at the site and at Navdatoli in 1952–53 in a joint expedition with the Maharaja Sayajirao University of Baroda. This revealed a developed chalcolithic culture dating to between the decline of the Harappan civilisation and the beginning of the Early Historical Period, largely explaining the hiatus between the periods. The culture was interpreted by Sankalia, mainly on the basis of resemblance of its pottery to that of Iran, as of Aryan origin. The horizontal excavation at Navdatoli was made in 1957–59 to reveal the settlement pattern, reconstruct the socioeconomic life of the chalcolithic people, and corroborate Sankalia's Aryan hypothesis.

== Nevasa ==
Sankalia's excavation at Nevasa, intended to prove (or disprove) the legend of its association with Jnaneshvara, revealed human occupation from the Lower Palaeolithic era to the Muslim-Maratha period.

== Early humans in Kashmir ==
Sankalia went to Kashmir to study its geological deposits, which had been investigated by De Terra, Paterson, and Wadia without finding early human evidence. When Sankalia was examining a deposit he saw a worked flake with a prominent bulb of percussion, establishing the existence of early humans in Kashmir. He also discovered a hand axe in the same deposit, dating to the ice age or slightly later.

== Inamgaon ==
After establishing the cultural sequence of the Chalcolithic cultures in Deccan and Central India, Sankalia wanted to reconstruct the lives of the Chalcolithic people with large-scale horizontal excavations at Nevasa and Navdatoli. The former site was found to be highly disturbed and the deposits overlying the Chalcolithic layers were too thick to be thoroughly removed, and the plan was abandoned. The site of Inamgaon was well-preserved, however, and was excavated over a 12-year period. After Sankalia's retirement in 1973 the excavation was completed by Z. D. Ansari and M. K. Dhavalikar, and its report was published in three volumes.

== Early humans in Sachchidananda ==
After his retirement, Sankalia lived on campus and was appointed professor emeritus of the department. At his home, he discovered what he believed were palaeolithic implements. After publishing his studies on the Ramayana, new archaeology and prehistoric art, he died at age 80 on 28 January 1989.

== Awards ==
Sankalia received the Narmad Suvarna Chandrak.

== Bibliography ==
- "Kundamala and Uttararamacarita". St. Xavier's College Magazine: 22: 63 - 76. (1930)
- University of Nalanda. Calcutta: B. G. Paul & Co. (2nd revised edition, New Delhi: 1973). (1934)
- "Megalithic Monuments near Poona". Bulletin of Deccan College Research Institute. 1: 178–184. (1940a)
- "Monuments of the Yadava period in the Poona District". Bulletin of Deccan College Research Institute: 2 (3-4): 217 -225. (1940b)
- "Studies in the Prehistory of Deccan (Maharashtra): a survey of the Godavari and the Kadva, near Niphad". Bulletin of Deccan College Research Institute: 4(3): 1–16. (1943)
- "Studies in the Prehistory of the Deccan (Maharashtra): a further survey of the Godavari (March 1944)". Bulletin of Deccan College Research Institute: 6: 131–137. (1945)
- Studies in Historical and Cultural Geography and Ethnography of Gujarat. Poona: Deccan College. (1949)
- "Archaeology and Indian Universities", Presidential Address at the Archaeology Section of the All India Oriental Conference, 16th Session, Lucknow. Pune: Deccan College. (1952a)
- The Godavari Palaeolithic Industry. Poona: Deccan College. (1952b)
- Report on the Excavation at Nasik and Jorwe, 1950-51. Poona: Deccan College. (With S. B. Deo.) (1955)
- "Animal fossils and Palaeolithic industries from the Pravara Basin at Nevasa, District Ahmednagar". Ancient India: 12: 32 -52. (1956)
- Excavation at Maheshwar and Navdatoli, 1952-53. Poona and Baroda: Deccan College and M. S. University. (With B. Subbarao and S. B. Deo.) (1958)
- From History to Prehistory at Nevasa (1954–56). Poona: Deccan College. (With S. B. Deo, Z. D. Ansari and Sophie Ehrhardt.) (1960)
- Indian Archaeology Today. Bombay: Asia Publishing House. (1962)
- "Kundamala and Uttararamacarita". Journal of Oriental Institute: 15(3-4): 322 -334. (1966)
- Excavations at Ahar (Tambavati). Poona: Deccan College. (With S. B. Deo and Z. D. Ansari.) (1969)
- Mesolithic and Pre-Mesolithic Industries from the Excavations at Sangankallu 1965. Poona: Deccan College. (1969)
- Chalcolithic Navdatoli. Poona and Baroda: Deccan College and M. S. University. (With S. B. Deo and Z. D. Ansari.) (1971)
- "Early man in Ice Age Kashmir". Current Anthropology: 2(4): 558 -562. (1971)
- Ramayana: Myth or Reality? New Delhi, People's Publishing House. (1973)
- Prehistory and Protohistory of India and Pakistan. Poona: Deccan College. (1974)
- Pre-Historic Art in India. New Delhi: Vikas Publishing House. (1978b)
- The Ramayana in Historical Perspective, Macmillan India, 1982, ISBN 0333903900
- "A primary Palaeolithic site-the Deccan College Campus, Pune, India". The Explorer's Journal: 63(1): 8–9. (1985a)
- "Follow-up on a Palaeolithic site in India". The Explorer's Journal: 63(3): 136–137. (1985b)
- "The Stone Age man in and around Pune (Poona) or the habitation of early man in Sat-Chit-Ananda". Bulletin of Deccan College Research Institute: 46: 115 -135. (1987)
