= Yashovarman =

King of Kannauj from 725 to 752

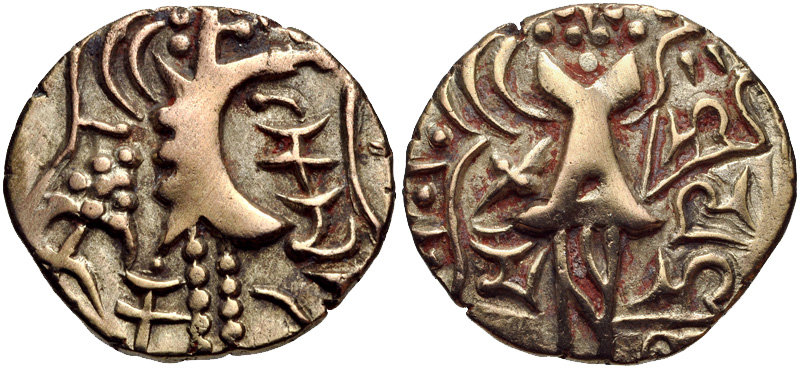
- Possible coinage of Yasovarman. Obverse: abstract Kushan-style king standing, legend "Kidara" to inner right (Late Brahmi script: Ki-da-ra), and Ka to the left. Reverse: Abstract Ardoxsho seated facing, Brahmi script legend "Sri Yasova" to right, "rma" to left.

King of Kannauj
- Reign: 725–752
- Predecessor: Arunāsva
- Successor: Āma
- Born: 7th or 8th century AD
- Died: 8th century AD
- Issue: Āma
- Dynasty: Varman

Yashovarman (IAST: Yaśovarman) was the ruler of the Kingdom of Kannauj and first king of the Varman dynasty.

== Life ==
Yashovarman was the king of Kannauj in the early part of the eighth century. The city (then known as Kanyakubja) had previously been ruled by Harsha, who died without an heir and thus created a power vacuum. This lasted for around a century before Yashovarman emerged as its ruler. Alexander Cunningham, an archaeologist of the British Raj period, speculated on possible rulers of Kannauj during the period between Harsha and Yashovarman but there is little evidence to support his claims.

Little is known of Yashovarman or his family, with most information being derived from the Gaudavaho (Slaying of the king of Gauda), a Prakrit-language poem written by Vakpati. Yashovarman was a supporter of culture and Vakpati was among his courtiers: the extent to which the poem can be relied upon for statements of fact is impossible to determine. (Note: Another poet who lived at the court of Yashovarman was Bhavabhuti.) Vakpati's work has been variously said to describe Yashovarman as either a divine incarnation of Vishnu or a kshatriya of the Lunar dynasty; Cunningham considered him likely to be related to the Maukharis, who had ruled Kannauj prior to Harsa, and some Jain works say that he was related to the Chandraguptas who ruled the Mauryan empire. The dates of his reign are also obscure, with assertions including c. 728–745 (Vincent A. Smith), around the late-seventh century/early eighth-century (Sankara Panduranga Pandit) and, according to the calculations of Rama Shankar Tripathi, probably 725–752.

The Gaudavaho depicts Yashovarman as conquering large swathes of northern India — including Bihar, Bengal, the western Deccan, Indus Valley and Kashmir — before returning in triumph to Kannauj. However, Kalhana, a Kashmiri court chronicler who lived around the 12th century CE, gives a very different story in his Rajatarangini, depicting Yashovarman as a ruler who was among those defeated by Lalitaditya Muktapida, a ruler of Kashmir. The variant claims of stupendous conquests given by both of these courtiers are improbable, with Tripathi saying of those in the Gaudavaho that "These exploits read more like fiction than sober history". Other early sources are the Prabhavakacarita, Prabandha Kosha and Bappabhattisuricarita, which are Jain documents.

Although R. C. Majumdar is among those who are wary of the ancient accounts of conquests, he believes that Yashovarman was "unquestionably the most powerful king [in the region] about this time." He believes that diplomatic relations existed between the Tang court and that in Kannuaj, evidenced by Yashovarman sending a minister to China in 731, and that he was for a time in alliance with Muktapida, with the two rulers defeating the Tibetans. These two diplomatic events may be connected because China was at that time at war with Tibet but it is also possible that the Chinese relationship grew from a shared concern about the growth of Arab power. The alliance with Muktapida collapsed around 740, according to Majumdar because of jealousy felt by the Kashmiri king. While Majumdar says that Lalitaditya then defeated Yashovarman and annexed his lands, Tripathi believes that Kalhana's account of what happened is inconsistent and that Yashovarman may have been allowed to remain on his throne after a "nominal acknowledgement of supremacy" to Lalitaditya.

== Legacy ==
Little physical evidence exists of Yashovarman's reign, although he is reputed to have constructed the temple at Harischandranagari (present-day Ayodhya). An inscription has been found at Nalanda, and some coins elsewhere, that may relate to him but there is no certainty.

According to the Jain chronicles, Yashovarman had a son named Āma, who succeeded him as the king of Kannauj during 749-753 CE. Historian Shyam Manohar Mishra believes this claim to be historically true, as it is not contradicted by any historical evidence. C. V. Vaidya theorized that the Ayudha rulers were descendants of Yashovarman, but no historical records connect the two dynasties. S. Krishnaswami Aiyangar similarly proposed that Vajrayudha and Indrayudha were names of Āma. But this theory is contradicted by the Jain accounts.
