= Jagaddhara =

Indian philosopher from Mithila

- जगद्धर

Personal life
- Flourished: During Kameshwar Thakur period
- Region: Mithila region
- Education: Sanskrit and vedic studies in Mithila
- Occupation: Philosopher

Religious life
- Religion: Hinduism
- Profession: Acharya

Religious career
- Period in office: 14th century CE

Jagaddhara (Sanskrit: जगद्धर) was an Indian philosopher and a versatile Sanskrit scholar from the Mithila region in the Indian subcontinent. He particularly flourished during the period of King Kameshwar Thakur in Mithila. His period of living is roughly estimated to be 14th century CE.

== Early life ==
Jagaddhara was born in the Suragana family of Maithil Brahmin in the Mithila region of Bihar. His father's name was Ratnadhara and mother's name was Damayanti. He belonged to Parashar Gotra.

== Later life ==
Jagaddhara was appointed as the Dharmadhikaranika at the court of King Dhirasimha in Mithila. The Indic term Dharmadhikaranika literally means "Office in charge of the department of religion" in Hinduism. Later he wrote several commentaries on the different ancient texts of the Hindu tradition. He became renowned commentator in the Hindu tradition.
