= Uttararamacarita =

8th-century Sanskrit play by Bhavabhūti

Uttararāmacharita (Sanskrit: उत्तररामचरित, IAST: Uttararāmacharita) (transl. The Later Story of Rama) is a Sanskrit play in seven acts in the Nataka style by Bhavabhuti. It depicts the later life of Hindu god Rama, from the coronation after Rama's return from exile, to his reunion with his wife Sita whom he abandoned immediately after his coronation and his two sons Lava and Kusha, covering a period of more than twelve years.

== Characters ==
Main characters:

- Rama – the eldest son of King Dasharatha
- Sita – Rama's wife
- Lakshmana – Rama's brother
- Atreyi – an elderly ascetic
- Vasanti – the sylvan deity

== Plot ==
Composed in seven acts, Uttararāmacharita's main theme is Sita's abandonment. The first act gives a brief summary of Rama's story up to the fire-ordeal of Sita. The common people who were away from the scene of the fire-ordeal, refused to be convinced, and made uncharitable criticism of Rama's acceptance of Sita. This forced Rama to take the regrettable decision of abandoning her. He sends her away without explanation under the pretext of satisfying her longing to visit the forests again in her pregnant condition. But Rama never entertained any doubt about her chastity and he never banished her from his mind, and this makes him undergo a living death for the next 12 years.

Sita gives birth to the twins, Lava and Kusha, who are brought up under the guardianship of Valmiki. Some time later, Rama goes to Panchavati to punish a Shudra ascetic and meets Vasanti, the presiding deity of the forests. She rebukes Rama for having abandoned Sita, and Rama becomes remorseful and experiences untold agony. Bhavabhuti projects this situation dramatically by making the invisible Sita a witness to Rama's deep agony. Sita who experiences grief due to the inexplicable abandonment, mentally reconciles to her husband completely on hearing that her golden icon was Rama's consort in the horse sacrifice. Goddesses Ganga and Prithvi declare Sita to be chaste, and Arundhati hands over Sita to Rama after the repentant public has given a full-throated approval to Sita's restoration. Thus Sita and Rama happily reunited.

== Influence ==
The Sanskritist and Archaeologist Hasmukh Dhirajlal Sankalia demonstrated that Dinnaga, author of Kundamala, influenced Bhavabhuti in the writing of the Uttaramacharita.

== Translation ==
Uttaramacharita was translated into Gujarati by Manilal Dwivedi.
