= Ayudha dynasty =

Former dynasty of Kannauj (770–816)

- c. 770–c. 816
- Capital: Kannauj
- Government: Monarchy
  - c. 770–c. 783: Vajrayudha
  - c. 791–c. 816 (Note: Chakrayudha being installed on the throne sometime between 790 and 793 is most plausible. Bhatia estimates that the event happened around 791.): Chakrayudha
- History
  - Established: c. 770
  - Disestablished: c. 816
Preceded by	Succeeded by
Varman dynasty (Kannauj)	Pratihara dynasty
- Today part of: India

The Ayudha dynasty was the ruling dynasty that ruled from Kannauj in the late 8th to the early 9th century. It ruled as a client kingdom of Dharmapala of Bengal during the reign of Chakrayudha. The dynasty was established when Vajrayudha deposed the Varmans and started ruling over Kannauj.

== History ==
The successors of Yashovarman, the powerful king of Kannauj, were all weak rulers who did not demonstrate the skills to run and defend the kingdom. Kannauj was taken over by Ayudhas, probably during the reign of Bhoja of Kannauj (not to be confused with Mihira Bhoja or Bhoja).

=== Vajrayudha ===
Vajrayudha, who ascended to the throne in 770 CE, was the first ruler of the dynasty.

He was probably defeated by the Karkota king of Kashmir, Jayapida. But if Jayapida carried out this campaign in the later years of his career, however the defeated king of Kannauj he defeated must instead have been Vajrayudha's successor, Indrayudha.

=== Indrayudha ===
Indrayudha succeeded his father Vajrayudha in 783. He was defeated by the powerful Rashtrakuta king Dhruva Dharavarsha, and the powerful king of the Palas, Dharmapala. Instead of annexing his territory, Dharmapala made Chakrayudha, his protégé, king of Kannauj as his vassal, and this was approved by the rulers of all the neighbouring territories. But then the two brothers, Indrayudha and Chakrayudha, started fighting for the important city of Kannauj.

=== Chakrayudha ===
When Dharmapala defeated Indrayudha, he appointed Indrayudha's brother, Chakrayudha, his protégé as the king of Kannauj, but as a vassal under Dharmapala. This arrangement was approved by the rulers of all the neighbouring territories. But then both the brothers, Indrayudha and Chakrayudha started fighting for the important city of Kannauj. Then the Rashtrakuta emperor Govinda III invaded the north and defeated and gained the submission of both Dharmapala and Chakrayudha.

== Decline ==
The invasion of Govinda III that defeated Chakrayudha and his overlord Dharmapala caused in anarchy and confusion in the region. The population was harassed by these invasions. Then the king of the Gurjara-Pratiharas, Nagabhata II, took advantage of the situation, invaded Kannauj, defeated Chakrayudha, and then made Kannauj his capital. This marked the end of the Ayudhas.
