= List of Sanskrit poets =

This is a list of Sanskrit-language poets.

== A ==
- Manmohan Acharya
- Agasthya Kavi
- Amaru
- Achalasimha
- Akalajalada
- Asaga
- Athula

== B ==
- Bharavi
- Bhartṛhari
- Bhāsa
- Bhatta Narayana
- Budhasvamin
- Banabhatta
- Bhamaha
- Bhavakadevi

== C ==
- Jayasri Chattopadhyay

== D ==
- Daṇḍin
- Keshab Chandra Dash
- Deshbhushan
- Umapati Dhara
- P. C. Devassia
- Rahas Bihari Dwivedi
- Dhoyin

== G ==
- Shatavadhani Ganesh
- Acharya Gyansagar
- Gangadevi
- Gyansagar
- Govardhana (poet)
- Govindabhatta

== H ==
- Harisena

== J ==
- Jatasimhanandi
- Jayadeva
- Jinaratnasuri
- Jaimini
- Jayathirtha
- Jaggu Vakulabhushana

== K ==
- Kālidāsa
- Kumaradasa
- Kilimanoor Raja Raja Varma Koithampuran
- Kshemendra
- Kuntaka
- Kavikalanidhi Devarshi Shrikrishna Bhatt
- Bhavabhuti
- Kesiraja

== L ==
- Lilasuka

== M ==
- Madhwacharya
- Madhuravani
- Magha
- Mallinātha Sūri
- Mithila Prasad Tripathi
- Harshadev Madhav
- Marula (poet)
- Mayurbhatta

== N ==
- Narayana Bhattathiri of Melpathur
- Narayana Panditacharya of Dvaita tradition

== P ==
- Jagannath Pathak
- Pāṇini
- Pandhareenathachar Galagali
- Prabodhananda Sarasvati
- Om Prakash Pandey
- Jagannatha Panditaraja
- Suman Pokhrel

== R ==
- Rambhadracharya
- Srinivas Rath
- Rewa Prasad Dwivedi
- Ram Karan Sharma
- Bhatt Mathuranath Shastri
- Shastri, Vidyadhar
- Kalika Prasad Shukla
- Palkuriki Somanatha
- Ramanuja

== S ==
- Sharan
- Subandhu
- Śūdraka
- Shankaracharya
- Devarshi Ramanath Shastri
- Satya Vrat Shastri
- Shilabhattarika
- Shriharsha
- Shudraka
- Someshvara (13th-century poet)

== T ==
- Trivikrama Panditacharya of Dvaita Tradition
- Ramji Thakur

== V ==
- Vallabha Acharya
- Valmiki
- Vedanta Desika
- Nudurupati Venkanna
- Vidyadhar Shastri
- Vikatanitamba
- Vilwamangalam Swamiyar
- Vishakhadatta
- Vyasa
- Vadiraja Tirtha
- Vyasaraja
- Vācaspati
- Vidyakara
- Vijja

== See also ==
- List of Indian poets
- Sanskrit revival
- List of Sanskrit universities in India
- List of Sanskrit academic institutes outside India
- List of historic Sanskrit texts
- List of Sanskrit Buddhist literature
- List of legendary creatures in Sanskrit Hindu mythology
- Symbolic usage of Sanskrit
- Sanskrit Wikipedia
