= Vikatanitamba =

Sanskrit poet

Vikatanitamba (before the 9th century) was a Sanskrit woman poet, noted for her simple and elegant verse, frequently with erotic elements.

== Origin ==
The name vikaTanitamba means one with hideous buttocks (vikaTa=horrible, nitamba=buttock) - and appears self-referentially in one of her verses. Such appellations were common for women poets in the classical era (e.g. jaghanachapala - quick thighs).

== Poetry ==
Her verse comes to us from several anthologies - Sarngadhara Paddhati, compiled by Sarangadhara, 1363); Subhashita-ratna-kosha (a.k.a. Kavindravachana samuchhaya), compiled by Vidyakara in the 12th century; Saduktikarnamrita compiled by Shridharadasa; and Subhasitavali compiled by Vallabhadeva.

Her verses are noted for their suggestiveness, and deal often with sensuous themes from shringara rasa. As an example, here is the poem, "Recollection" (tr. Octavio Paz)

At the side of the bed
the knot came undone by itself,
and barely held by the sash
the robe slipped to my waist.
My friend, it’s all I know: I was in his arms
and I can’t remember who was who
or what we did or how

== Accolades ==
Her verses have been praised by poets such as Rājaśekhara for their simplicity and elegance, and she is quoted in texts on literary style, such as the dhvanyaloka of Anandavardhana (9th century), the Kāvyālaṁkarashekhara, Vyāktiviveka, etc.

== Life ==
A verse quoted in Bhojadeva's sringara prakAsha (light on love, c. 1000), is given as being spoken by a female friend (sakhi) of vikaTanitamba:

pritah kale vadati sabhAsham
tadviparitam sasya hiraNye
lumpati chashtre ram va sham va
tasmai datta vikatanitamba

translated roughly as - a man illiterate and foolish, who could not spell consonant combinations such as ustra, and always confusing the sibilants. to him was given vikaTanitamba.

while the authenticity of the verse is doubted by some, there is a tradition that she was perhaps a widow who married again
