= Shilabhattarika =

9th c. Sanskrit-language Indian poet

Shila-bhattarika (IAST: Śīlābhaṭṭārikā) was a 9th-century Sanskrit poet from present-day India. Her verses appear in most major Sanskrit anthologies, and her poetic skills have been praised by the medieval Sanskrit literary critics.

== Biography ==
Shilabhattarika lived in the 9th century. One of her poems mentions the Narmada River (Reva) and the Vindhya mountains. Therefore, as a young woman, she probably lived along the Narmada River, near the Vindhyas.

In 1993, M. B. Padma, a scholar of the University of Mysore, speculated that she may be same as Shila-mahadevi, the queen of the 8th century Rashtrakuta ruler Dhruva. Padma's theory is based on the facts that the suffix "Bhattarika" attached to the poet's name indicates her high social status, and that the queen is known to have made generous grants to scholars.

In 2023, Shreenand L. Bapat of Bhandarkar Oriental Research Institute identified Shilabhattarika as a daughter of the Chalukya ruler Pulakeshin II, based on the decipherment of an inscription. According to Bapat, her name appears in a copper-plate charter of the Chalukya king Vijayaditya, dated January-February 717 CE; she was married to Dadiga, a son of the Ganga ruler Mushkara alias Mokkara. The comparison of Shilabhattarika with Banabhatta by Rajashekhara must be seen on the background of the enmity of Pulakeshin II, Shilabhattarika's father and Harshavardhana, patron of Banabhatta.

The 10th century poet Rajashekhara praises Shilabhattarika as a leading figure of the Panchali literary style (one of the four major contemporary literary styles - the other three being Vaidharbhi, Gaudi, and Lati). A verse, attributed to Rajashekhara in Vallabhadeva's 15th century anthology Subhashitavali, states that this style maintains "a balance between words and meaning". According to Rajashekhara, the Panchali style can be traced to the works of Shilabhattarika, and possibly in some of the works of the 7th century poet Bana.

Shilabhattarika has been quoted by several classical Sanskrit literary critics, and her verses appear in most major Sanskrit anthologies. She is known to have written at least 46 poems on topics such as "love, morality, politics, nature, beauty, the seasons, insects, anger, indignation, codes of conduct, and the characteristic features of various kinds of heroines." However, most of her works are now lost, and only six of her short poems are extant.

Sharngadhara-paddhati, a 14th-century anthology, praises her and three other female poets in the following words:

Shilabhattarika, Vijja, Marula, and Morika are poetesses of renown with great poetic genius and erudition. Those who have command over all branches of learning, having participated in dialogues with other scholars and having defeated them in debates, are regarded as sound scholars and experts. Consequently, they alone are venerable in the scholarly world.

— Dhanadevas, in Sharngadhara's Paddhati

== Example verses ==
The following short poem of Shilabhattarika is considered as one of the greatest poems ever written in the Sanskrit tradition. Indian scholar Supriya Banik Pal believes that the poem expresses the speaker's anxiety to be reunited with her husband. According to American author Jeffrey Moussaieff Masson, the poet, possibly a middle-aged woman, implies that the illicit, pre-marital love between her and her lover was richer than their love as a married couple. An interpretation by the 16-century philosopher Chaitanya suggests that the verse is a metaphor for a person's desire to be united with the "Supreme Lord - the Absolute".

Who deprived me of my virginhood that same, indeed, is my bridegroom;
those same are the nights of Chaitra (spring); and those same are the luxuriant kadamba breezes, fragrant with the blooming malati flowers;
and I too, am what I was;
yet my heart longs for indulging in sports of love, there beneath the cane arbour on the banks of Narmada

— Shilabhattarika (Translation by R. C. Dwivedi)

The following verse expresses the speaker's longing for his wife:

Thought has arisen in the heart of one separated from his beloved
– seeing this, sleep has deserted him. Who would adore a faithless one?

— Shilabhattarika (translation by Roma Chaudhari))

In the following verse, a poor speaker expresses grief at not being able to provide his loved one with jewels or food:

I am deeply anguished at the sight of my beloved’s bracelet bereft of jewels.
Yet now my heart breaks to see our earthen cooking vessel without any morsel of food left in it.

— Shilabhattarika

The following verse, also quoted in the Subhashita Ratna Bhandagara, describes the importance of learning and engaging in discussions with scholars:

The talent of the man who engages himself in studies, cultivates
exercises on writing, possesses a clear view, participates in discussions
and debates with scholars, and exchanges his views
with senior experts will blossom forth in its rich abundance like
the lotus unfolding its petals at the touch of the sun’s rays.

— Shilabhattarika
