= Kalyanavarman =

Kalyanavarman may refer to one of the following people:

- Kalyanavarman (Varman dynasty), a 5th-century ruler of the kingdom of Kamarupa in India
- The author of the Sārāvalī, a foundational compilation of Indian astrology
- The protagonist of the Sanskrit text Kaumudi-Mahotsava
