= Vijja =

8th or 9th century Sanskrit poet from India

Vijja, also known as Vidya or Vijjaka, was an 8th or 9th century Sanskrit poet from present-day India. Her verses appear in the major medieval Sanskrit anthologies.

== Names and identification ==
Vijja (IAST: Vijjā) is known by several alternative names. Vidyakara's anthology calls her Vidyā, while Sharngadhara-paddhati uses the Prakrit form Vijjakā. Vallabhadeva's anthology also calls her Vijjakā, although some of its manuscripts use the variations Vijjāka or Vijjikā.

=== Identification with Vijayanka or Vijaya ===
A verse, attributed to Rajashekhara in Jalhana's Suktimuktavali, states:

That Vijayanka, the Karnata woman, conquers like Sarasvati
Who next to Kalidasa was a part having vaidarbha speeches

— Rajashekhara

Some modern writers have identified this Vijayanka (literally "having the mark of victory") with the Vidya or Vijja (literally "knowledge" or "science") mentioned in several Sanskrit anthologies. This person is also identified with Vijaya (r. c. 650-655 CE) of the Chalukya dynasty that ruled the Karnata region in southern India.

One of the verses attributed to Vijja compares her to the goddess of learning, Sarasvati, and states that she had a dark complexion unlike the goddess. This verse also mentions the famous poet Daṇḍin (a native of southern India), calling him wrong for describing Sarasvati as "all-white" in his invocation to the goddess at the beginning of Kavyalakshana.

Not knowing me, Vijjaka, dark as the petal of a blue water lily,
Dandin has vainly declared that Sarasvati is 'all white'.

— Vijjaka (Vijja), quoted in Sharngadhara's Paddhati

Jalhana's Suktimuktavali contains a variation of this verse, beginning with "Not knowing her, Vijjākā, dark as petal..."; Jalhana attributes the verse to an anonymous poet. The verse may be considered as evidence supporting Vijja's connections to South India, but there is no concrete proof she was same as Pulakeshin's daughter-in-law Vijaya. In fact, such an identification results in chronological improbabilities: the poet whose works mention the 8th century poet Dandin could not have been the 7th century royal Vijaya, unless she lived until the end of the century, and deigned to notice a verse by a much younger author.

Dhanadeva, a writer who praises Vijja as a talented poet, also mentions a poet called Vijayanka (Vijaya), who excelled in the Vaidarbhi style. Dhanadeva's writings do not clarify if these two women poets are the same person.

=== Identification as the author of Kaumudi Mahotsava ===
The Sanskrit play Kaumudi-Mahotsava is known from a single manuscript discovered in Kerala. The manuscript was partially damaged by worms, and had a hole at the place that appears to state the beginning of the author's name in the prologue. The visible part of the author's name can be read as ("-kayā"); the ending syllable suggests that this is a feminine name. Scholar Manavalli Ramakrishna Kavi (1866-1957) saw the remains of what he believed to be "ja", and read the name as "jakayā", although Indologist A. K. Warder finds this reading doubtful.

Based on Kavi's reading and the space occupied by the hole, some scholars have theorized that the author was "Vijjakayā", identifying her with Vijja. However, Warder notes that the word could have been another name, such as "Morikayā". Alternatively, the broken word may not be a name at all: it is possible that the sentence containing it states that "the play was composed with a sub-plot patākayā".

An analysis of the play's style and language indicates that it was definitely not authored by the poet Vijja: the play resembles the works of earlier authors such as Bhasa, and is highly unlikely to have been composed after the 6th century.

== Date ==
Vijja finds a mention in the writings of Rajashekhara (10th century) and Bhoja (11th century). One of her poems mentions the 7th-8th century scholar Daṇḍin. Based on this, she is believed to have flourished in the 8th or the 9th century.

== Poems ==
Vijja wrote poems featuring topics such as love, nature, changes of season, the sea, and the female beauty. Her verses are characterized by eloquent expressions, long compounds, and rhythmic sound effects. These verses are included in the major Sanskrit anthologies.

A verse attributed to Dhanadadevas in Sharngadhara's 14th-century anthology Paddhati names Vijja among four notable women poets:

Shilabhattarika, Vijja, Marula, and Morika are poetesses of renown with great poetic genius and erudition. Those who have command over all branches of learning, having participated in dialogues with other scholars and having defeated them in debates, are regarded as sound scholars and experts. Consequently, they alone are venerable in the scholarly world.

— Dhanadevas, in Sharngadhara's Paddhati

=== Example verses ===
The following verse has been attributed to Vidya by Vidyakara and Shridhara-dasa, to Vijjakā by Sharngadhara, to Vijjākā by Jalhana, and to an anonymous author by Vallabhadeva:

You are fortunate who describe the hundreds of coaxings of play-talk
during lovemaking, in union with your lover,
But when my lover has put his hand on the knot of my garment,
O friends, curse me if I remember anything

— Vijjaka (Vijja)

The following verse has been attributed to Vidya by Vidyakara and Shridhara-dasa, to Vijjakā by Sharngadhara, to Vijjākā by Jalhana. Here, a woman refers to the scratches that she expects her lover to leave on her body.

O neighbour, will you give an eye here to our house too for a moment?
Usually the father of this baby won't drink insipid well-water:
I am going quickly, though alone, from here to the stream covered with tamalas;
let the knots on the old segments of the reeds, between which there is no space, scratch my body!

— Vijjaka (Vijja)

In the following stanza, Vijja compares dire poverty to death:

All of the maladies prominent in death – immovability, a feeble voice, a perspiring body, and terrible fear –
are equally identifiable in an impoverished person.

— Vijja

The following poem is about sex:

On that rich night, bright with lamplight.
We made love slowly; but all night
The bed creaked, He paused to breathe.
All night the bed gnashed its teeth.

— Vijja
