= Devarshi Ramanath Shastri =

Sanskrit poet, scholar and commentator

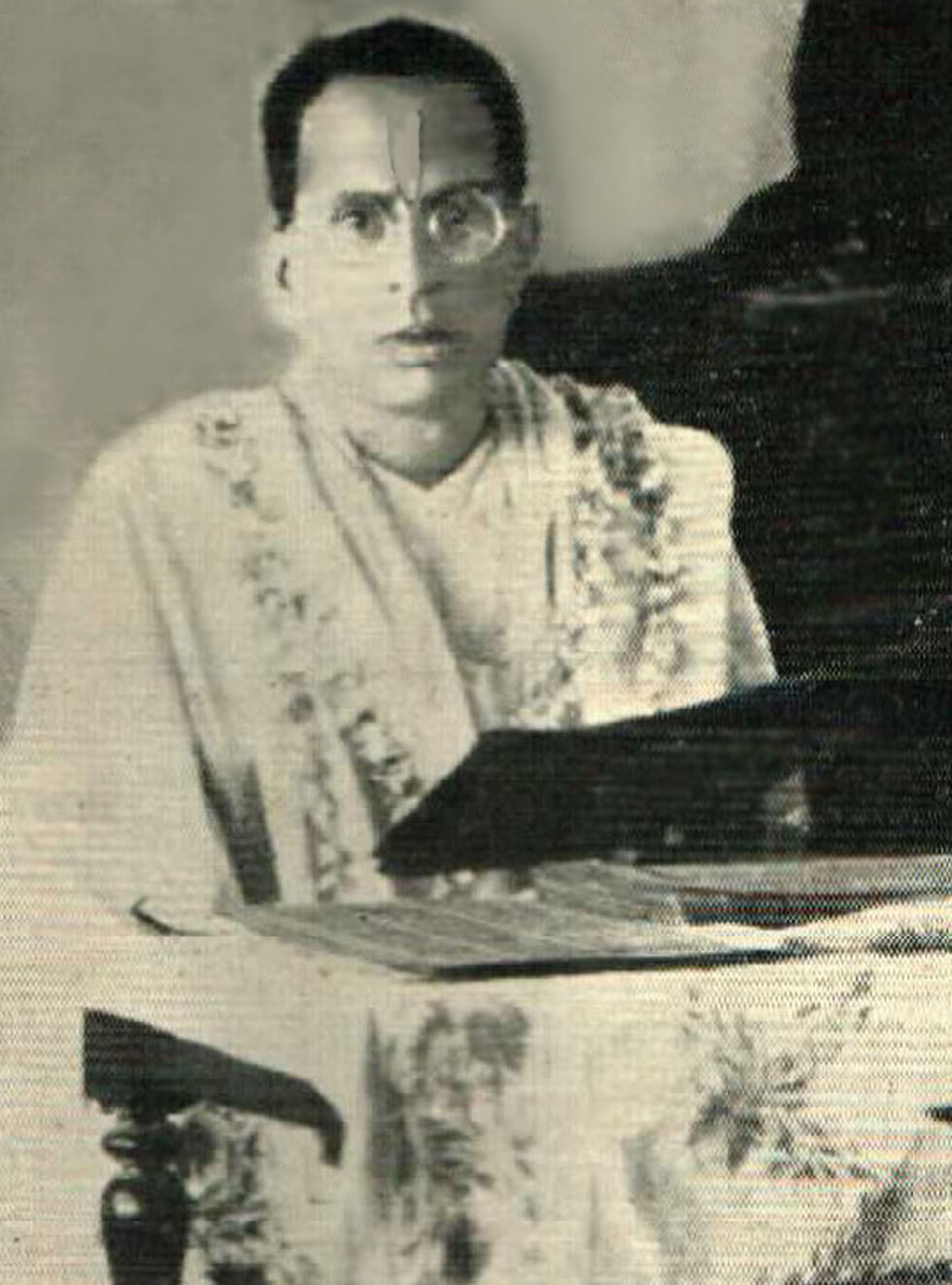
Devarshi Ramanath Shastri

Pundit Devarshi Ramanath Shastri (1878 – 1943) was a Sanskrit poet, scholar and commentator on Pushtimarg (the path of Krishna’s grace) and Shuddhadvaita Vedanta, the philosophical school of pure non-dualism propounded by Shri Vallabhacharya (1479-1531). He was born in 1878 (corresponding to Shravana Shukla Panchami of Vikram Samvat 1936 of the Indian calendar) in Jaipur, Rajasthan in a renowned Vellanadu Brahmin family of Sanskrit scholars belonging to the Taittariya branch of Krishna Yajurveda, who migrated from Andhra Pradesh to North India in the 15th century AD and to Jaipur in the 18th century with his famous ancestor Kavikalanidhi Devarshi Shrikrishna Bhatt having been invited by Sawai Jai Singh II. His father’s name was Shri Dwarakanath Bhatt and mother’s name was Shrimati Janaki Devi. His only son was Devarshi Brajnath Shastri (1901-1954), who was also a scholar of Shuddhadvaita. He was the elder brother of epoch-making Sanskrit poet and scholar Bhatt Mathuranath Shastri. He wrote extensively in Hindi, Sanskrit and Brajbhasha languages.

== Education and early life ==
Devarshi Ramanath Shastri received his early Sanskrit education in the famous Maharaja Sanskrit College of Jaipur. He had started composing poems in Sanskrit from his childhood. One of his earliest poems titled ‘Dukhinibala’ was published in a reputed Sanskrit magazine ‘Sanskrit Ratnakar’ of that era. He moved to Varanasi (then Benaras) in 1896 in pursuit of higher education. Later, he shifted to Mumbai (then Bombay) in the year 1903, which became the abode for his literary, academic and spiritual activities for the next 27 years.

At Mumbai, he became a regular visitor to a book shop owned by one Narayan Moolji, where litterateurs, scholars and those interested in spiritual discussions assembled every evening. At one of the scholarly discussions, a renowned denizen of Mumbai, Seth Chattamorarji, was present who got highly impressed by the level of Devarshi Ramanath Shastry's scholarly arguments and oratory skills to conclude a debate on an issue. On Seth Chattamorarji's insistence, Pandit (Pt.) Ramanath Shastry started living in Anantwadi locality where he would give learned discourses on such scriptures as Shrimadbhagwat, Gita, Upanishads, etc. His popularity and fame spread throughout Mumbai, drawing people from all walks of life to listen to his scholarly enunciation of the intricacies in these scriptures and tenets of pushtimarg.

Pt. Ramanath Shastry was later offered the position of chief religious speaker (the ‘Vyas’ chair) at Shri Gokuladheesh Temple of Pushtimarg sect by Goswami Govardhanlalji Maharaj, who also recommended him to be the Principal of the then Vasanji Manji Sanskrit School, functioning in the Hanuman street.

== Contribution to Pushtimarg Sect ==
During his stay in Mumbai, Devarshi Ramanath Shastri came in contact with Goswami Shri Gokulnathji Maharaj of Mota Mandir, also called Bada Mandir, the famous pushtimargiya vaishnav temple of deity Bal Krishna Lal. The two became friendly after a few meetings and their association brought about a religious revolution of sorts in the Pushtimargiya Vaishnav Sect, infusing renewed vigour and interest in the Pushtimarg and Shuddhadvaita (Pure Non-dualism) philosophy of which Mahaprabhu Vallabhacharya was the main exponent.

Pt. Ramanath Shastri soon established himself as a learned commentator of Pushtimarg, acted as the Sect's mentor for knowledge base, and wrote several enlightening commentaries on various books, including those written by Shri Vallabhacharya. He would also give discourses on Bhagawata Purana on a regular basis, besides looking after the Balkrishna Library and the Vaishnava School at Mota Mandir. He composed many of his own monumental works relating to Gita, Lord Krishna, Chhandogya Upanishad etc., besides books on philosophy of Pure Non-dualism (Shuddhadvaita) during this period.

== Interaction with Eminent Citizens and Leaders ==
While in Mumbai, Pt. Ramanath Shastri was offered the position of Honorary Secretary of the erstwhile prestigious societies like ‘Vidwat Parishad’, ‘Brahmavad Parishad’, and ‘Sanatan Dharma Sabha’ to which he contributed for a long time. He founded an organization called 'Svadharma Vivardhini Sabha', where a series of lectures was organized on the Eleventh day of every month of Indian calendar. His lectures and discourses became so popular that another organization called ‘Arya Svadharmodaya Sabha’ located in Madhav Bagh of Mumbai invited him to deliver his discourses and lectures on Bhagavad Gita also, which were attended by many eminent personalities, including Mathuradas Gokuldas, Krishnadas Natha, Devkaran Nanji, Pt. Hanuman Prasad Poddar, etc. Occasionally at this place, Pt. Ramanath Shastri would interact with National Leaders like Rajagopalachari, Chittaranjan Das and Mahatma Gandhi. His oratory and scholarship brought him to speak at prestigious meetings and conferences of ‘Chatuh Sampradaya Vaishnav Mahasabha’, ‘Varnashram Swarajya Sangh’ and ‘Sanatan Dharma Sabha’ also. He was invited to be the convenor of ‘Akhil Bharatiya Brahman Maha Sammelan’ at Patna around that time.

== Honours ==
Recognized for his scholarship on the Bhagavata Purana, Devarshi Ramanath Shastri presided as chief chair (Mukhyasana) at several traditional 108-recitation (parayana) ceremonies of the text. Philanthropist and Gita Press editor Hanuman Prasad Poddar acknowledged Shastri’s scholarly contributions to the publication of the Bhagavata Purana. In Mumbai, industrialist Raja Baldev Das Birla appointed him to chair discourses on the scripture. Shastri also authored foundational texts on Pushtimarg theology and Shuddhadvaita philosophy, including Shuddhadvait Siddhantasaar and Shuddhadvaita Darshan.

== A Versatile Personality ==
Devarshi Ramanath Shastri possessed a charming personality and was a versatile person having varied interests in which he excelled. He learnt painting from J.J. School of Art, Mumbai and created many paintings in oil and water colour. Some of his known oil paintings, like ‘Sheron ka Swarajya’ (the kingdom of the lions), ‘Shardool Vikram’, and ‘Radha Madhav’ were exhibited at various art exhibitions, where they were displayed with a sign reading ‘Not for Competition’. Many of his paintings have found a place of honour in the drawing rooms of art connoisseurs and in art galleries. He was also an accomplished photographer, cricketer and chess player, who would compete with the European members of the prestigious erstwhile Hindu Jimkhana Club, of which he was a member.

== Important works ==
Pt. Ramanath Shastri wrote many books, commentaries and treatises, some of which are mentioned below:

- Shuddhadvait Darshan (vol.2), Pub. Mota Mandir, Bhoiwada, Mumbai, 1917
- Brahmasambandh athva Pushtimargiya Diksha, Pub. Sanatan Bhakrimargiya Sahitya Sewa Sadan, Mathura, 1932
- Raslila Virodh Parihar, Pub. Vidya Vibhag, Nathdwara, Rajasthan, 1932
- Bhakti aur Prapatti ka Swaroopagat Bhed, Pub. Shuddhadvait Siddhant Karyalaya, Nathdwara, 1935
- Shri Krishnavatar kim va Parabrahmn ka Avirbhav, Pub. Shuddhadvait Pushtimargiya Siddhant Karyalaya, Nathdwara, 1935
- Shrikrishnashraya, Pub. Pushti Siddhant Bhawan, Parikrama, Nathdwara, 1938
- Ishwar Darshan, Pub. Vidya Vibhag, Bathdwara, 1939
- Pushtimargiya Swaroop Sewa, Pub. Vidya Vibhag, Nathdwara, 1943
- Shrikrishna Leelaon par Shastriya Prakash (Vol.1), Pub. Vidya Vibhag, Nathdwara, 1944.
- Brahmvaad, Pub. Pushtimargiya Karyalaya, Nathdwara, 1945
- Pushtimargiya Nityasewa Smaran, Pub. Shrivallabhacharya Jan Kalyan Pranyas, Mathura, 1989
- Anugrah Marg (According to Subodhiniji), Pub. Shrivallabhacharya Jan Kalyan Pranyas, Mathura, 1994
- Shuddhadvait Darshan (in three volumes, new edition), Pub. Vidya Vibhag, Nathdwara, 2000

In addition to the above books, he also authored several other works in Hindi, Gujarati and Sanskrit and translated some scriptures, some of which are unpublished or are available as manuscripts -

- ‘Siddhanta Rahasya Vivritti’
- ‘Shuddhadvait Siddhantasaar’ (Hindi and Gujarati)
- ‘Trisootri’ (Comparison of Shankar and Vallabh doctrines on Gita Theory)
- ‘Shodashgranth Teeka’
- ‘Stuti Parijaatam’ (in Sanskrit)
- ‘Darshanadarshah’ (in Sanskrit)
- ‘Gita Taatparya’
- ‘Shrimadvallabhacharya’
- ‘Bhagwan Akshar Brahmn’
- ‘Shrimadbhagwatgita’ (Hindi translation) Bhagavad Gita
- ‘Radhakrishna Tattva’
- ‘Subodhiniji ka Vishad Anuvaad’,
- ‘Chhandogyopanishad Bhashyam’ (in Sanskrit) etc.

He started composing a treatise titled ‘Gita ki Samalochana’ in 1942, which got completed only a week before his death in 1943.

== His Later life ==
Devarshi Ramanath Shastri stayed in Mumbai until 1930. On invitation of the then Maharana of Mewar and the then Tilakayat Goswami Shri Govardhanlal ji of Nathdwara, he moved to Nathdwara in Rajasthan. He became the Head of the well-known Vidya Vibhag, which was a repository of valuable Pushtimarg literature. Together with other associates, he founded a society called ‘Sahitya Mandal’, the work of which brought him in contact with Pt. Madan Mohan Malaviya also. At Nathdwara, Pt. Shastri devoted himself fully to the praise of famous deity of Lord Shrinathji, visited Shrinathji Temple daily and composed literary poems in Sanskrit eulogising Lord's grace. After the death of Pt. Ramanath Shastri, his son Devarshi Brajnath Shastri took over as the Head of Vidya Vibhag (1943-1950).

Devarshi Ramanath Shastri died at the age of 65 years in 1943 at Nathdwara.
