= Akalajalada =

Sanskrit-language poet

Akāla-jalada (c. 8th–9th century) was a Sanskrit-language poet from the Tripuri Kalachuri kingdom of present-day Central India. He was the great-grandfather of the Gurjara-Pratihara court poet Rajashekhara.

== Biography ==
Akalajalada was the great-grandfather of the 10th century poet Rajashekhara, so he must have lived in the 8th century or 9th century. He came from the Yayavara Brahmana family of Maharashtra: Rajashekhara's Bala-Ramayana calls him Maharashtra-chudamani ("crest jewel of Maharashtra"). The prologue of the text names the poets Surananda and Tarala as other members of this family. These ancestors of Rajashekhara flourished at the court of the Kalachuris of Tripuri.

"Akalajalada" (literally "out-of-season cloud") was probably a sobriquet, not the poet's real name. The poet was also known by other names, including Dakshinatya and Dvanduka. A verse attributed to Akalajalada in Sharngadhara-paddhati is attributed to Dakshinatya ("Southern") in Vallabha-deva's Subhashitavali. Vidyakara's Subhashita-ratna-kosha attributes the same verse to "Dvanduka".

According to a verse by Rajashekhara, quoted by the 12th century writer Jalhana, a dramatist named Kadambari-rama plagiarized from Akalajalada for a nataka (play), and gained reputation as an excellent poet.

== Works ==
Only one verse attributed to Akalajalada is now extant. Its English translation by A. K. Warder is as follows:

In which with its frogs sleeping in hollows, its tortoises as
if they had died in the earth,
its sheat fish, after wriggling in the broad bed of mud,
had fainted again;

In that dried up lake a cloud out of season came and acted so
that herds of wild elephants have plunged in up to their
necks and are drinking the water.

Alternative translation by M. C. Choubey, according to whom this is the description of a drought in the Tripuri Kalachuri kingdom:

The summer has dried the tanks, hence the frogs have hibernated in the earth,
the tortoises have taken shelter in the crest of the earth,
the fishes whose life is water have become moribund.

In such a state, the Rain God has become frigid.
Suddenly the rain came in showers,
and animals started drinking to their hearts' content.

A verse attributed to Rajashekhara in Jalhana's Sukti-muktavali suggests that Akalajalada had written many muktakas (detached stanzas). These were later compiled into a collection titled Vachana-Chandrika, which was highly appreciated by 77 contemporary poets.
