= Kala Nath Shastry =

Indian writer (1936–2025)

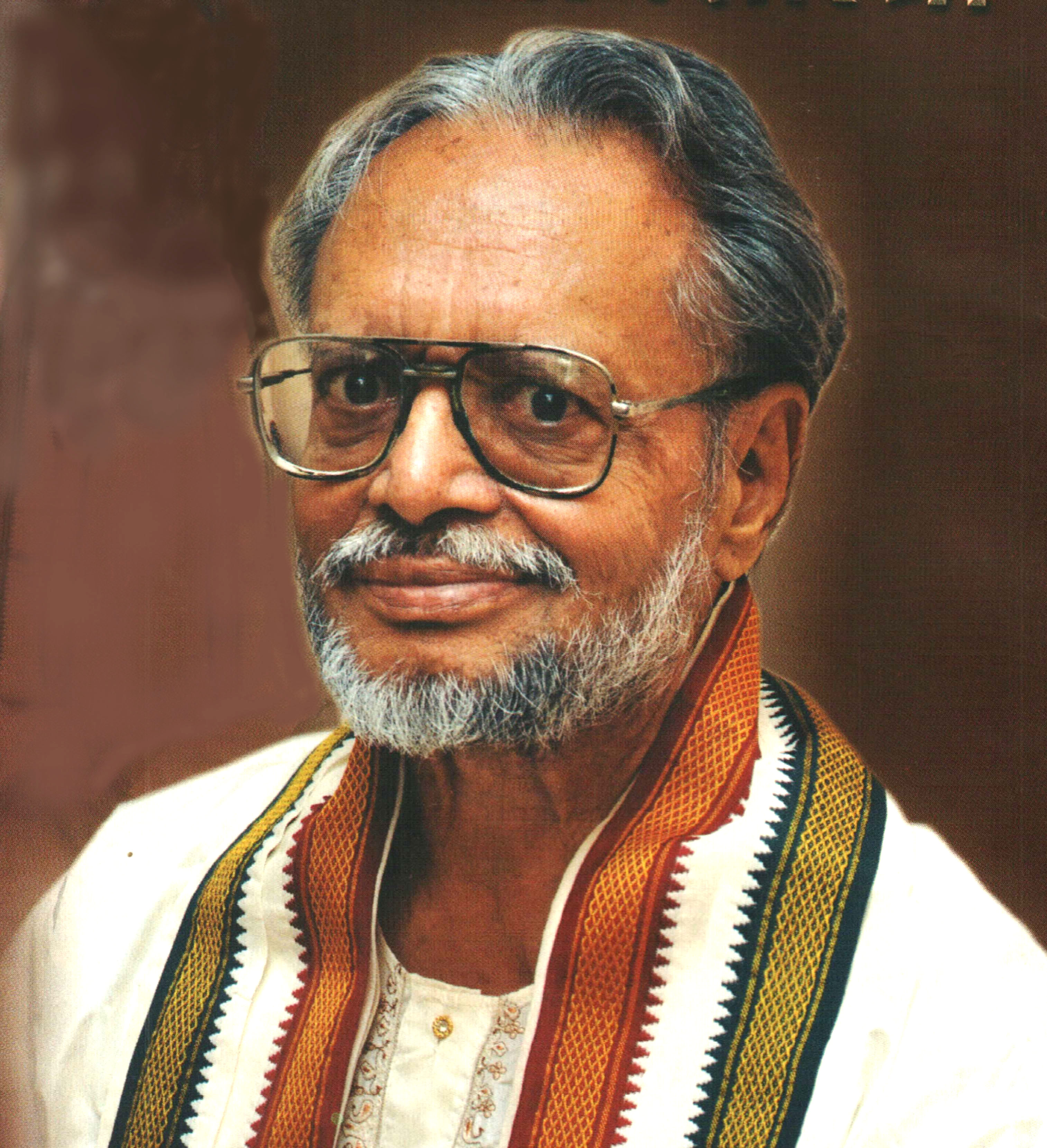
- Born: 15 July 1936; Jaipur, Jaipur State, India
- Died: 25 February 2025 (aged 88); Jaipur, Rajasthan, India
- Education: Maharaja Sanskrit College, Jaipur; Maharaja's College, Jaipur
- Known for: Sanskrit Literature; Hindi Linguistics
- Awards: Rashtrapati Award (1998); Sahitya Akademi Award (2004)
- Scientific career
- Fields: Sanskrit Linguistics, Hindi Indian Culture
- Workplaces: Department of Languages Maharaja College; Rajasthan Hindi Granth Academy; Directorate of Sanskrit Education; Department of College Education; Sikar Govt. College; Kotputli Govt. College Was Chairperson, Modern Sanskrit Chair, JRR Sanskrit University, Jaipur

Devarshi Kala Nath Shastry (15 July 1936 – 25 February 2025) was an Indian Sanskrit scholar honoured by the President of India in 1998. He was an Indologist and a prolific writer in Sanskrit, Hindi and English, and a well-known linguist, who contributed to the campaign of evolving technical terminology in Indian languages and ensuring a respectable status for Hindi, the official language of his state and the Indian union. Shastry died on 25 February 2025, at the age of 88.

== Academic contribution ==
Shastry continued the rich tradition of introducing modern genres and modes of expression in an ancient language like Sanskrit for which his father, the late Kavishiromani Bhatt Mathuranath Shastri, was known in the history of modern Sanskrit literature. He authored more than two dozen books and edited equal number of books in Sanskrit, Hindi and English and was known for his interliterary translations of monumental works of Philosophy and literature in these languages and also Prakrit, Vraj Bhasha, Rajasthani and other Indian languages.

== Literary achievements ==
Shastry contributed more than a thousand articles in Hindi and Sanskrit to reputed journals of India and broadcast more than 200 talks, poems, and plays in Sanskrit, Hindi and English. He was a literary historian, critic and commentator. In the history of modern Sanskrit literature he was known as a fiction writer who introduced a modern idiom in creative Sanskrit writing through his novels, short stories, personal essays, and his books on the 20th century Sanskrit literature. He was the chairman of the Rajasthan Sanskrit Academy (2021) and the Director of Sanskrit Education and Bhasha Vibhag (1976–1994).

== Career ==
His career started with the pursuit of traditional Sanskrit learning, Indian Aesthetics, Comparative Linguistics, the Vedas & Shastras under the tutelage of Sanskrit scholars like his own father Bhatt Mathuranath Shastri, Giridhar Sharma Chaturvedi, Pt. Pattabhiram Shastri, Pt. Hari Shastri, and Jagdish Sharma. He mastered the linguistics and aesthetics of Sanskrit, and also studied the literatures of Hindi and English.

After obtaining his post-graduation degree with a 1st Division in English, he taught English Language and literature at the Postgraduate colleges of the University of Rajasthan for eight years, then took over the administration of official language as deputy director and later as Director of Bhasha Vibhag (Directorate of Official Language) of the Government of Rajasthan from which position he retired in 1994.

He was also Director of Sanskrit Education, Government of Rajasthan (1991–1993). He served as chairman, Rajasthan Sanskrit Academy (1995–1998) and founder- Chairman of Kavishiromani Bhatt Mathuranath Shastri Sanskrit Chair at the Jagadguru Ramanandacharya Rajasthan Sanskrit University, Jaipur. He was the Chairman of the Modern Sanskrit Chair at the Sanskrit University. He was also an advisor and permanent member of the Rajasthan Government's Hindi Law Committee, and a member of the Kendriya Sanskrit Board, National Book Trust and Sahitya Academy. He was associated in different capacities with dozens of governmental and non-governmental associations, institutions and organisations related with Sanskrit and Hindi. He was also the founder Chairman of the "Manjunath Smriti Sansthan", a trust in the memory of his father, located in Jaipur.

Devarshi Kala Nath Shastry worked as a member of the 2nd Sanskrit Commission of the Government of India (2014–2016).

== Major honours and awards ==
Shastry was honoured by a large number of institutions, universities, organisations and governments with titles such as 'Mahamahopadhyaya' (in 2008 by Shri LBS Rashtriya Sanskrit Vidyapeeth, Deemed University, New Delhi), 'Sahitya Mahodadhi' (1993), and 'Sahitya Shiromani' (1999) and awards such as the Lifetime Achievement Award for Sanskrit, Government of Rajasthan, Jaipur 2012; Lifetime Achievement Award for Sanskrit Journalism by Uttar Pradesh Sanskrit Sansthan, 2008; Award for Sanskrit by Central Sahitya Academy (2004), Dwarka Seva Nidhi Pragyaa Puraskar, 2018; D.Litt (Vidya Vachaspati by Rajasthan Sanskrit University, 2019; Lifetime Achievement Award (Ajivan Sanskrit Sadhna Samman), 2022 by Govt. of Rajasthan, Rajasthan Sanskrit University Honours by Ministry of Human Resources, Govt. of India (1995 and 1998). He was recognised for his contribution to Sanskrit by none other than the President of India, Dr. K. R. Narayanan, in 1998. He was bestowed with the "Rashtrapati Puraskar" for his contribution to Sanskrit.

== Major published works ==
- Works of Panditaraj Jagannath's Poetry :1987: 134pp 22 cm ISBN 8185263388
- Aakhyanvallari (Story Collection in Sanskrit: Awarded by the Sahitya Akademi, New Delhi in 2004)
- Sanskrit ke Gaurav Shikhar (Series-10), Rashtriya Sanskrit Sansthan, New Delhi, 2006
- Adhunik Kaal ka Sanskrit Gadya Sahitya (Series-17), Rashtriya Sanskrit Sansthan, New Delhi
- Jeewanasya Prishthadwayam (Novel)
- One Hundred Years of Philosophy (Translation of John Passmore's History of Modern Western Philosophy), Published by the Rajasthan Hindi Granth Academy, Jaipur, 1966, 1987
- Sanskrit Sahitya ka Itihas (History of Sanskrit Literature), 2009
- Sanskriti ke Vaataayan (Collection of Cultural Essays)
- Bhartiya Darshan ka Itihas (Translation of Dasgupta's book in 5 volumes with Ramesh Kumar) Published by the Rajasthan Hindi Granth Academy, Jaipur, 1978, 1988, 1998
- Makers of Indian Literature: Bhatt Mathuranath Shastri 'Manjunath', Central Sahitya Academy, New Delhi, 2013
- Kavitavallari (collection of poems), Jaipur, 2006
- Kathanakvalli (story collection), Jaipur, 1987
- Vidvajjanacharitamritam (biographies), New Delhi, 1982
- Vaidik Vangmaya mein Bharatiya Sanskriti, Bikaner, 2003
- Manak Hindi ka Swaroop, New Delhi, 2002 and Jaipur, 2010
- Bharatiya Sanskriti – Adhaar aur Parivesh, Jaipur, 1989
- Sahitya Chintan, Jaipur 2005
- Lalitkatha Kalpavalli, Jaipur, 2012
- Adhunik Sanskrit Sahitya: Ek Vyapak Drishtipaat, Allahabad, 2001
- Bhartiya Sanskriti-Swaroop aur Siddhaant, Jaipur, 2003
- Sanskrit Natyavallari (collection of drama), Jaipur, 1999
- Sudheejanvrittam (collection of biographies), Jaipur, 1997
- Sanskrit ke Yugpurush: Manjunath, Jaipur, 2004
- Jaipur ki Sanskrit Parampara, Jaipur, 2000
- Horizons of Sanskrit, Pub. Rajasthan Sanskrit Akademy, Jaipur, 2016
- Hamare Purodha Mahavir Prasad Joshi, Udaipur, 2018
- Rajasthan Ke Kaljayi Sahityakar, Jaipur, 2019.

He translated a large number of books, research journals, commemorative volumes, in Sanskrit and Hindi, and also books to and from English, Sanskrit, Prakrit and Rajasthani languages.

He was the chief editor of renowned Sanskrit monthly Bharati until his death.
