= Kavikalanidhi Devarshi Shrikrishna Bhatt =

Hindu learned man (1675-1761)

Kavikalanidhi Devarshi Shrikrishna Bhatt (1675–1761), a contemporary of the Maharaja Sawai Jai Singh II of Jaipur, was an 18th-century Sanskrit poet, historian, scholar, and grammarian. He was an immensely accomplished and venerated poet of Sanskrit and Brajbhasha at the courts of the Kings of Bundi and Jaipur. He belonged to a reputed Sanskrit family of Vellanadu Brahmins from modern day Andhra Pradesh in South India who migrated to North India in the 15th century on invitation from various erstwhile princely States. His father's name was Laxman Bhatt.

Sawai Jai Singh II (1688–1743) was a connoisseur of art and literature, besides being a great warrior. During his rule, he invited many prominent and reputed scholars, artists, tantriks, painters, architects and town planners from different parts of the country. Devarshi Shrikrishna Bhatt was one such Sanskrit scholar and poet. He was a witness to the Ashwamedha yajña (1716) and Vajapeya yajña (1734) performed by Sawai Jai Singh II and to the founding and construction of Jaipur city. His famous epic Ishvar Vilas Mahakavya provides an excellent description of the reigns of Kings Sawai Jai Singh II (1688–1743) and his son Maharaja Ishvari Singh (1743–1750).

== Ancestral migration to North India ==
A Sanskrit work by the name ‘Kulaprabandha’ written by Harihar Bhatt has documented the sequence of the first migrations of the scholars belonging to the ‘Bhatt - Tailang’ lineage to North India. Many of the Brahmin scholars in the 15th century accompanied religious gurus like Shri Shankaracharya and Shri Vallabhacharya during their religious India wide tours or pilgrimages to North India. When these people came in contact with the erstwhile princely courts, the kings came to know of their high scholarship. They were honourably offered state positions of ‘court poets’ or gurus. Many of them stayed back and migrated to the northern states of India. Some scholars were also picked up and offered respectable positions when they went to study at places like Kashi. In due course of time, they adopted Hindi or other North Indian languages as their mother-tongue.

== Genesis of family title "Devarshi" ==
The ancestors of Kavikalanidhi Shrikrishna Bhatt were from Devalpalli or Devarkonda in Andhra Pradesh. A scholar from the family by the name of Baviji Dixit had come to North India with the family of Shri Vallabhacharya in the 15th century. He studied at Kashi and Prayag which were known for their educational excellence and religious importance. His children too studied there. In the 15th–16th century, these educational cities were under the governance of the then princely state of Rewa in Madhya Pradesh, with Prayag sharing the latter's boundary. Impressed by the high level of scholarship of Baviji Dixit's great grandson Mandal Dixit, King Gopal Singh brought him to Rewa as his Guru and awarded him the estate (village) by the name "Divrikhiya". The name of the village or original place of residence is traditionally prefixed with the first name in Andhra. "Devarshi" became the family title ("Avatank") either because of they being original residents of Devarkonda (or Devalpalli) or later due to the name "Divrikhiya" of the "jagir" awarded to them by the King. It was in this family that Kavikalanidhi Devarshi Shrikrishna Bhatt was born. Later, for a few years his family lived under the patronage of the King of Rewa, Maharaja Ajit Singh (1755–1809), also known as "Bandhav Naresh".

== Residency in Jaipur ==
After the royal families of Bundi and Rewa entered into matrimonial alliances, there was a more cordial and enhanced communication between the two erstwhile states. Owing to the interest of the King of Bundi in scholarly pursuits and his patronising nature, many scholars and pundits were brought from Rewa to Bundi and awarded important positions. Thus, Kavikalanidhi Devarshi Shrikrishna Bhatt became the ‘state pundit’ (raaj-pundit) in the court of Raja Budh Singh (1696 to 1735) of Bundi.

Kavikalanidhi's scholarship and his in-depth knowledge of the Vedas, Upanishads, Puranas, grammar, philosophy and music were highly revered in Bundi. Besides his proficiency in those fields, he was also an extraordinary poet who wrote in Sanskrit, Prakrit and Brajbhasha and was an orator par excellence. Some of his books like Alaṅkāra Kalānidhi, Śṛṅgāra Rasamādhurī, and Vidagdha Rasamādhurī were composed by him while in Bundi. All these qualities of this great man impressed Sawai Jai Singh of Amber (Jaipur), who was the brother-in-law of Raja Budh Singh of Bundi. Maharaja Sawai Jai Singh sought from Budh Singh to have this great man Kavikalanidhi Shrikrishna Bhatt to take him to the court of Amber with all the honours. He also requested and offered Shrikrishna Bhatt the high position of "State Pundit" of the princely state of Amber. However, Shrikrishna Bhatt being loyal to the state of Bundi, did not want to take the decision of leaving Bundi by himself. It was only after the King of Bundi acceded to the request of Sawai Jai Singh that Kavikalanidhi agreed to move to Amber. This fact is mentioned in several historical documents as –

"Būndīpati Budhasiṃh sauṅ lyāe mukha sauṅ yāchi", meaning that "he (Jai Singh) beseeched the King of Bundi Budh Singh with his own mouth to bring him" (Shrikrishna Bhatt to Amber).

The family tree of Skrikrishna Bhatt Kavikalanidhi is detailed in the publication Uttar Bharatiya Andhra-Tailang-Bhatt Vansh Vriksha, which also includes the family trees of other Vellanadu Brahmin Bhatt-Tailang migrants from Andhra to North India. According to this, many of the descendants of Kavikalanidhi have been great scholars, poets, and writers, among them being Dwarka Nath Bhatt, Jagdish Bhatt, Vasudev Bhatt, Mandan Bhatt, Devarshi Ramanath Shastri, Bhatt Mathuranath Shastri, and Devarshi Kala Nath Shastry.

== Titles ==
Devarshi Shrikrishna Bhatt was conferred with the titles of "Kavikalānidhi" and "Rāmarāsāchārya" by none other than Maharaja Jai Singh II himself. Impressed by his commanding knowledge and scholarship in Vedic scriptures, and his prowess in poetic composition in languages like Sanskrit, Brajbhasha, and Prakrit, the King bestowed on him the title of ‘Kavikalānidhi’.

There is an incident associated with one of Shrikrishna Bhatt's works, ‘Rāmarāsā’ and the other title ‘Rāmarāsāchārya’. During a court proceeding, Maharaja Sawai Jai Singh suddenly asked the courtiers whether a book about Lord Rama's Rāslīlā also existed similar to Lord Krishna's. There was a stunning silence in the court. Shrikrishna Bhatt also happened to be present there. He rose and said that there was a book in Kashi depicting Rama's Rāsa. The King asked him to procure that book within two months’ time. Shrikrishna Bhatt came home and pondered over his assertion of such a book indeed being available, although there was none. He then started composing the book himself and wrote the Rāmarāsā in Brajbhasha similar to the Ramayana, within two months. When he presented the book to the King within the stipulated time, the King was extremely pleased and conferred on Shrikrishna Bhatt the title of ‘‘Rāmarāsāchārya’’, besides giving him sumptuous monetary gifts.

== Notable works ==
The books written by Kavikalanidhi Devarshi Shrikrishna Bhatt encompass many disciplines, languages and literary genres, including poetry and history. The "Ishvar Vilas" epic is an historic treatise written in poetry form that narrates all the significant events of Jaipur. Its manuscript is preserved in the Pothikhana of City Palace (Chandra Mahal), while it has been published with detailed editorial comments and foreword by the doyen of Sanskrit poetry Bhatt Mathuranath Shastri (1889–1964), who in his own epic Jaipur Vaibhavam equated Kavikalanidhi's poetry in Sanskrit and Brajbhasha with that of Tulsidas, Surdas, Bihari, and Bharavi, thus-

"Tulasī-sūra-vihāri-kṛṣṇabhaṭṭa-bhāravi-mukhāḥ Bhāṣākavitākāri-kavayaḥ kasya na sambhatāḥ".

Shrikrishna Bhatt Kavikalanidhi's main books are –

- Īśvaravilāsa Mahākāvyam
- Alankāra Kalānidhi (in Brajbhasha)
- Sundarīstavarāja
- Padyamuktāvalī
- Vṛttamuktāvalī (Work on metrics and rhythmics in Indo-Aryan languages)
- Jajau Yuddha (Historic account of the battle of Jajau, India)
- Rāma Candrodaya
- 'Śṛṅgārarasamādhurī (Braj bhasha)
- Vṛttachandrikā
- Vedānta Pañcaviṃśati
- Sāmbhara Yuddha (Historical poem about the battle of Sambhar, India, on 3 October 1708)
- Rāmarāsā
- Jayasiṃha Guṇasaritā
- Vidagdhamādhurī
- Ṭīkā Upaniśad
- Nakhaśikhavarṇana
- Bahadura Vijaya
- Rāmagītam
- Durgābhaktitaraṅginī
