= Rishi =

Sanskrit term for a sage in Indian religions

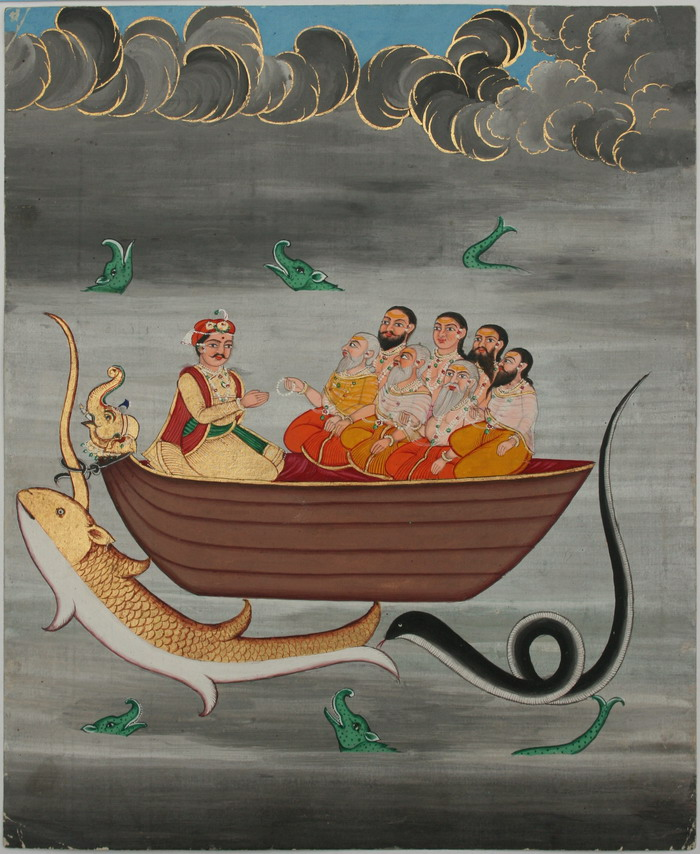
A late 18th century painting of Saptarishi and Manu from Jaipur, Rajasthan.

In Indian religions, a rishi (Sanskrit: ऋषि IAST: ṛṣi) is an accomplished and enlightened person. They find mention in various Vedic texts. Rishis are believed to have composed hymns of the Vedas. The Post-Vedic tradition of Hinduism regards the rishis as "great yogis" or "sages" who after intense meditation (tapas) realized the supreme truth and eternal knowledge, which they composed into hymns. The term appears in Pali literature as Isi; in Buddhism they can be either Buddhas, Paccekabuddhas, Arahats or a monk of high rank.

== Etymology ==
According to Indian tradition, the word may be derived from two different meanings of the root 'rsh' (ṛṣ). Sanskrit grammarians derive this word from the second meaning: "to go, to move". V. S. Apte gives this particular meaning and derivation, and Monier-Williams also gives the same, with some qualification.

Another form of this root means "to flow, to move near by flowing". (All the meanings and derivations cited above are based upon Sanskrit English Dictionary of Monier-Williams). Monier-Williams also quotes Tārānātha who compiled the great (Sanskrit-to-Sanskrit) dictionary named "ṛṣati jñānena saṃsāra-pāram" (i.e., "one who reaches beyond this mundane world by means of spiritual knowledge").

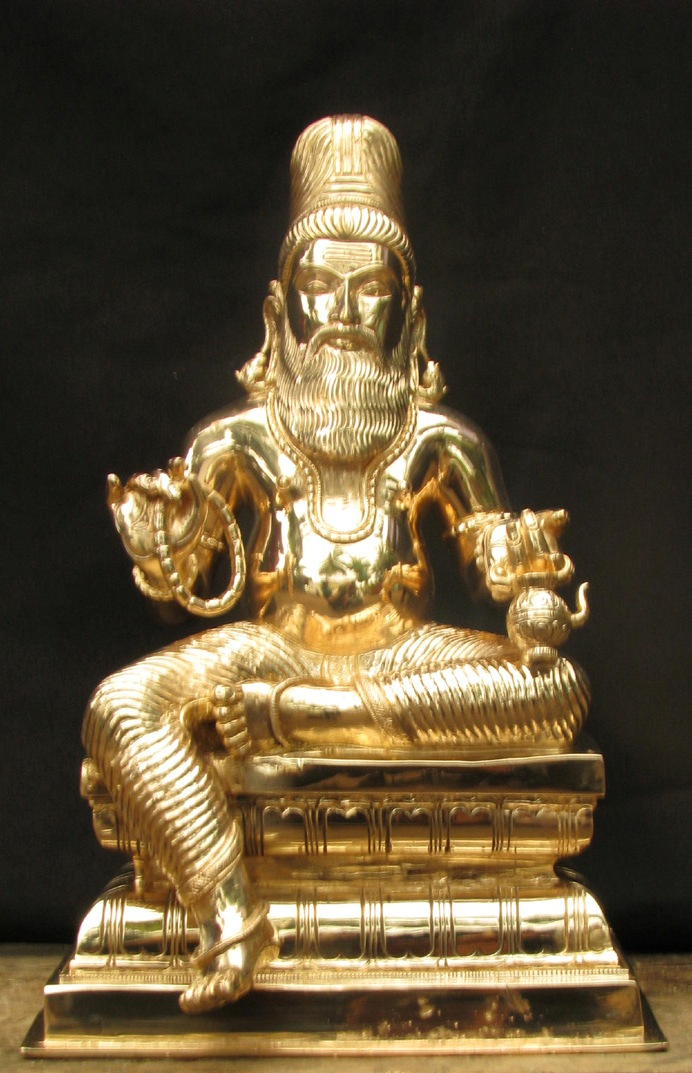
Agastya, a revered sage in Hindusim

Before Monier-Williams' work was published, Yāska suggested it came from "drish" and quotes Aupamanyava to support his opinion.

However, the root has a close Avestan cognate ərəšiš "an ecstatic" (see also Yurodivy, Vates). Yet the Indo-European dictionary of Julius Pokorny connects the word to a PIE root *h₃er-s meaning "rise, protrude", in the sense of "excellent" and thus cognate with Ṛta and right and Asha. In Sanskrit, forms of the root rish become arsh- in many words, (e.g., arsh).

Modern etymological explanations such as by Manfred Mayrhofer in his Etymological Dictionary leave the case open, and do not prefer a connection to ṛṣ "pour, flow" (PIE *h₁ers), rather one with German rasen "to be ecstatic, be in a different state of mind" (and perhaps Lithuanian aršus).

== In Hindu texts ==
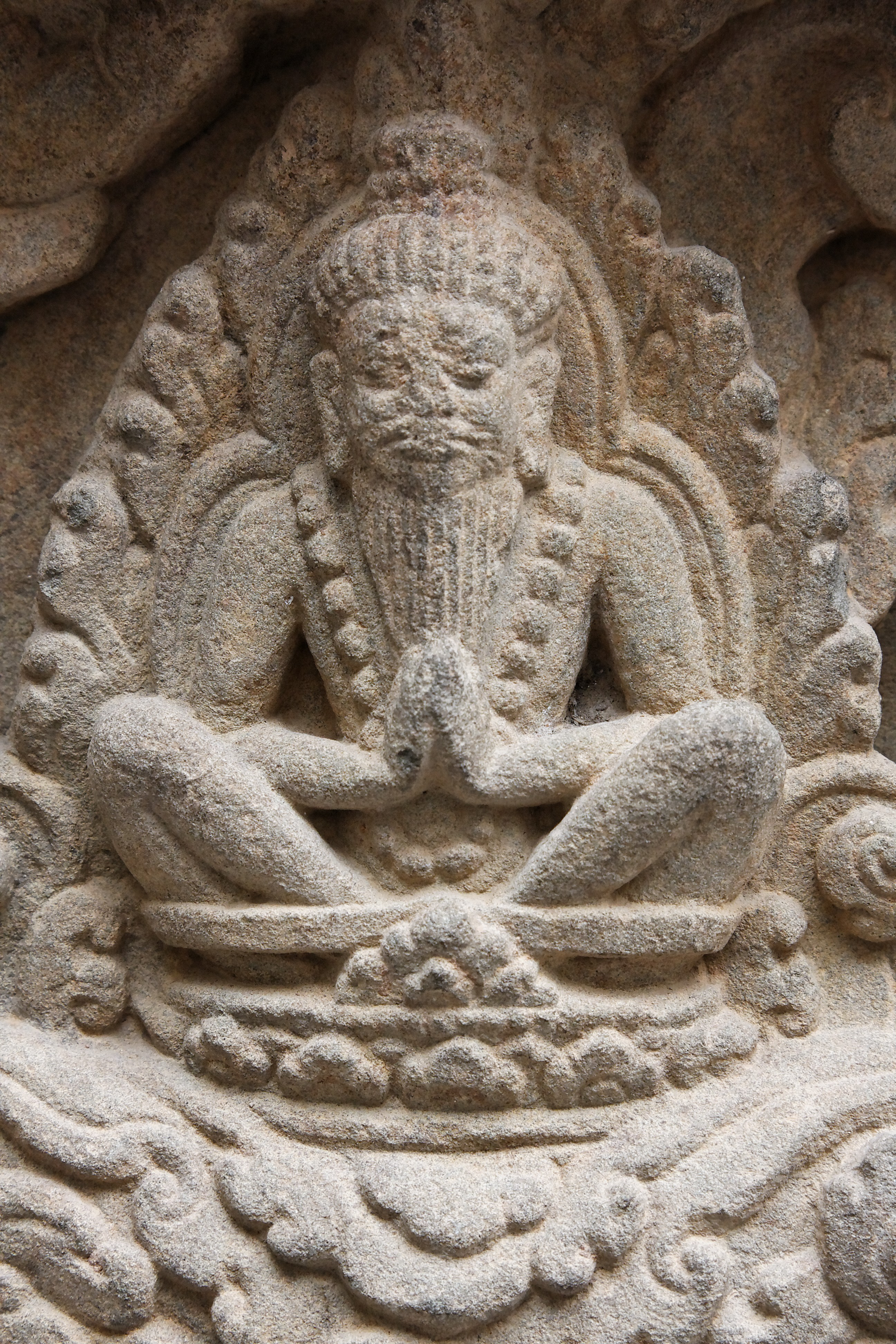
A temple relief showing a Rishi.

In the Vedas, the word denotes an inspired poet of Vedic hymns. In particular, Ṛṣi refers to the authors of the hymns of the Rigveda. Some of the earliest lists of Rishi are found in Jaiminiya Brahmana verse 2.218 and Brihadaranyaka Upanishad verse 2.2.4.

Post-Vedic tradition regards the Rishis as "sages" or saints, constituting a peculiar class of divine human beings in the early mythical system, as distinct from Asuras, Devas and mortal men. Swami Vivekananda described "Rishi"s as Mantra-drashtas or "the seers of thought". He told— "The truth came to the Rishis of India — the Mantra-drashtâs, the seers of thought — and will come to all Rishis in the future, not to talkers, not to book-swallowers, not to scholars, not to philologists, but to seers of thought."

The Rig Veda mentions female rishikas such as Romasha, Lopamudra, Apala, Kadru, Visvavara, Ghosha, Juhu, Vagambhrini, Paulomi, Yami, Indrani, Savitri and Devayani. The Sama Veda adds Nodha, Akrishtabhasha, Sikatanivavari and Gaupayana.

In Mahabharata 12, on the other hand, there is the post-Vedic list of Marīci, Atri, Angiras, Pulaha, Kratu, Pulastya and Vashista. The Mahābhārata list explicitly refers to the saptarshis of the first manvantara and not to those of the present manvantara. Each manvantara had a unique set of saptarshi. In Harivamsha 417ff, the names of the Rishis of each manvantara are enumerated.

In addition to the Saptarṣi, there are other classifications of sages. In descending order of precedence, they are Brahmarshi, Maharshi, Rajarshi. Devarṣi, Paramrṣi, Shrutarṣi and Kāndarṣi are added in Manusmriti iv-94 and xi-236 and in two dramas of Kālidasa.

The Chaturvarga-Chintāmani of Hemādri puts 'riṣi' at the seventh place in the eightfold division of Brāhmanas. Amarakosha (the famous Sanskrit synonym lexicon compiled by Amarasimha) mentions seven types of riṣis : Shrutarshi, Kāndarshi, Paramarshi, Maharshi, Rājarshi, Brahmarshi and Devarshi. Amarakosha strictly distinguishes Rishi from other types of sages, such as sanyāsi, bhikṣu, parivrājaka, tapasvi, muni, brahmachāri, yati, etc.

== In Buddhist texts ==
The term Rishi found mentions throughout the Buddhist texts. In Pali, they are known as "Isi"s. A Rishi can also be called a Buddha, Paccekabuddha, Arhat or monk of high rank. In Buddhist Pali literature, Buddha is called many times as "Mahesi"(Pali; Sanskrit: Maharṣi; meaning the greatest sage). The Isigili Sutta in Pali Canon, mentions the name of Five hundred Rishis (Paccekabuddhas). The Buddhist text, Mahamayuri Tantra, written during 1–3rd centuries CE, mentions Rishis throughout Jambudvipa (modern day India, Pakistan, Afghanistan, Bangladesh, Nepal) and invokes them for the protection of the Buddhadharma.

Many Jatakas also mentions various Rishis. The Naḷinikā Jātaka (Jā 526) introduces a past life of the Buddha, a Rishi(Isi), living alone in the Himālayas. His son, who was also a Rishi, was named Isisiṅga (Pali; Sanskrit:Ṛṣyaśṛṅga). The Agastya Jataka (Sanskrit; Pali: Akkhata Jataka) story, mentions Bodhisattva, named Agastya(Sanskrit; Pali: Akkhata) as Rishi.

== Ruesi in Cambodia, Thailand, Myanmar and Laos ==
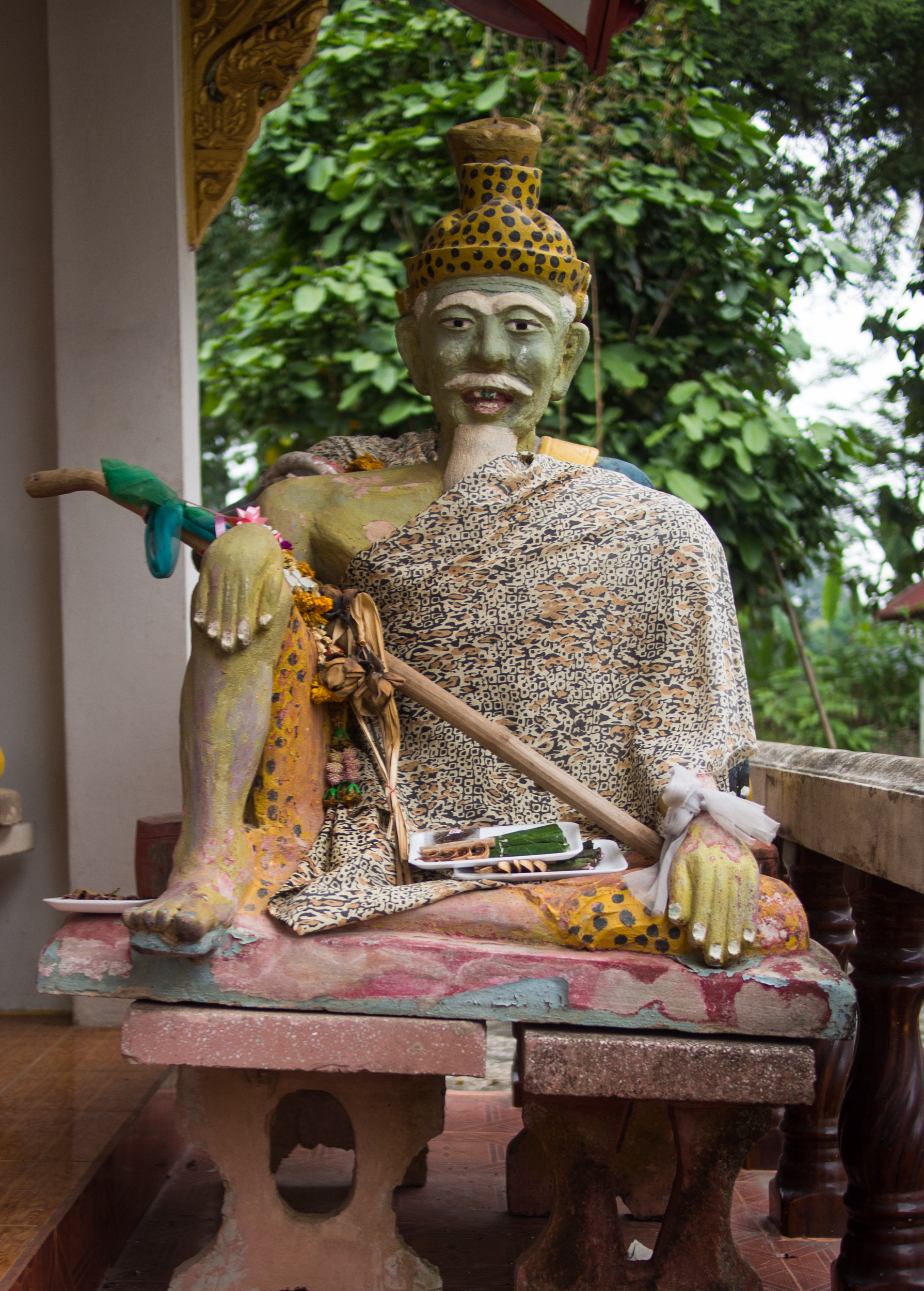
A statue of a Ruesi at Wat Suan Tan in Nan, Thailand

Ruesi (Sanskrit: ṛṣi, Khmer: តាឥសី, Thai: ฤๅษี, Lao: ລືສີ) is a hermit sage, the equivalent of Rishi in India. Rishi Akkhata (Pali; Sanskrit: Agastya), known as Phra Reusi Akkhot in Thailand, is an important Ruesi in Southeast Asia, as in the Buddhist Jataka scriptures, this Ruesi is mentioned as the bodhisatta and practiced his ascetism in Sri Lanka and Southeast Asia. In Myanmar, there are some known as ရသေ့ (ya-the) such as U Khandi. Veneration of Ruesis is a notable practice in Southeast Asian Buddhism. The name "Rishi" (pronounced "ruesi") is also the basis of one of the letters of the Thai alphabet, so reu-si (Thai: ษ ฤๅษี).

== Rishi in Indonesia ==
Most medieval era Hindu temples of Java, Indonesia show Rishi Agastya statues or reliefs, usually guarding the southern side of Shaivite temples. Some examples include Candi Sambisari and the Prambanan temple near Yogyakarta. In Indonesian, rishi is called resi.

== Other uses ==
Rishi is also a male given name, and less commonly a Brahmin last name.

In Carnatic music, "Rishi" is the seventh chakra (group) of Melakarta ragas. The names of chakras are based on the numbers associated with each name. In this case, there are seven rishis and hence the 7th chakra is "Rishi".

The descendant families of these Rishis, refer to their ancestral lineage through their family "gotra". This is a common practice among the Brahmin sects of the current Hindu society.

== See also ==
- Devarishi
- Saptarishi
- Rishi Panchami
- Rishikas
- Sadhu
- Rishabha (Hinduism)
- Rishabhanatha
- Pravaras
- Sramana
- Apaurusheyatva
- Yogi / Yogini
- Kavi
- Vidyadhara
- Weizza
- Xian
