= Bhatt Mathuranath Shastri =

Sanskrit poet (1889–1964)

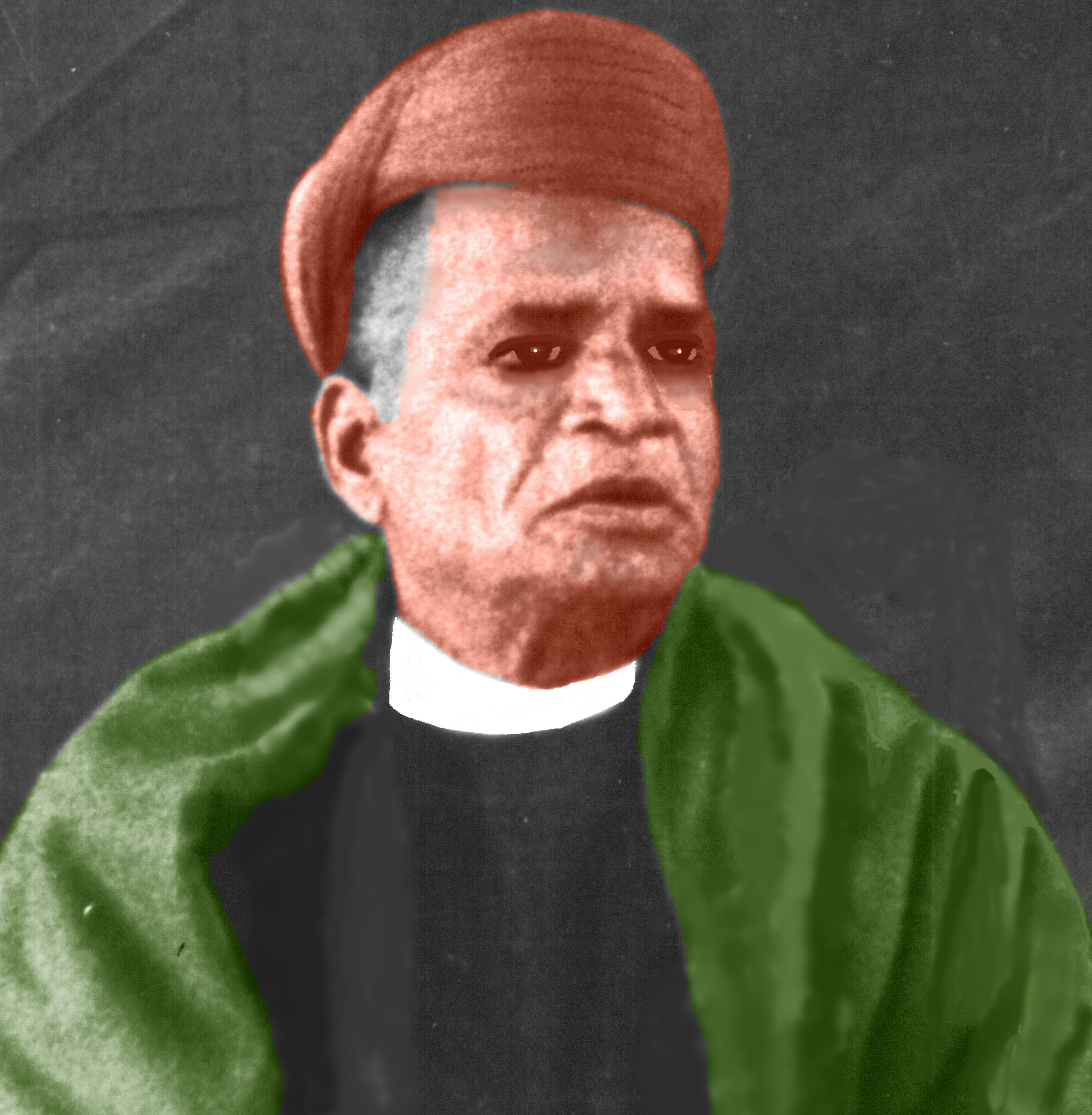
- Bhatt Mathuranath Shastri (photo from a previously held All India Sanskrit Conference in Varanasi)
- Born: 23 March 1889; Jaipur, Rajputana, India
- Died: 4 June 1964 (aged 75)
- Occupations: Sanskrit scholar, poet, philosopher, grammarian, polyglot, expert of Tantra

Bhatt Mathuranath Shastri (Sanskrit: भट्ट मथुरानाथ शास्त्री) (23 March 1889 – 4 June 1964) was an eminent Indian Sanskrit scholar, poet, philosopher, grammarian, polyglot and expert of Tantra from Jaipur, Rajasthan. He was one of the prominent Sanskrit writers of the twentieth century who wrote on both traditional and modern themes. He pioneered the use of several new genres in Sanskrit literature, writing radio plays, essays, travelogues, and short stories. He wrote many songs in Sanskrit including Ghazals, Thumris, Dadras and Dhrupads. He pioneered the use of Prakrit (Braja and Hindi) metres in Sanskrit poetry.

== Life ==
=== Birth ===
Bhatt Mathuranath Shastri was born in Jaipur in the famous Devarshi family which had a tradition of great Sanskrit scholars and poets going back to more than four hundred years. His father's name was Devarshi Dwarkanath Bhatt, mother's name was Shrimati Janaki Devi and elder brother's name was Devarshi Ramanath Shastri, who himself was a Sanskrit scholar, proponent and commentator of Pushtimarg sect of 'pure non-dualism' (Shuddhadvaita). His ancestors were Tailanga Brahmins of the Gautama Gotra following the Krishna Yajurveda. The Devarshi family started with Baviji Dikshit, who migrated from Devarkonda or Devalpalli village (origin of their family name Devarshi) in current-day Andhra Pradesh to Varanasi during Mughal Empire rule. The descendants of Baviji Dikshit later migrated from Varanasi to Prayag, then to Rewa (where they were given the Jagir of village named Divrikhiya) and then to Bundi. From Bundi, Maharaja Sawai Jai Singh brought Kavikalanidhi Devarshi Shrikrishna Bhatt, a celebrated poet of Sanskrit and Braj-Bhasha, to his Jaipur-court and awarded him the title of "Kavikalānidhi" (treasure of poetic expertise). Descendants of Shrikrishna Bhatt in the Devarshi family include Dwarkanath Bhatt, Jagdish Bhatt, Vasudev Bhatt, and Mandan Bhatt, who were all royal poets in the court of the Maharajas of Jaipur. In this family, Mathuranath Shastri was born on 23 March 1889 in Jaipur.

=== Education ===
Mathuranath Shastri after acquiring basic knowledge of Urdu and Persian in the beginning, studied grammar and Sanskrit at the Maharaja's Sanskrit College in Jaipur. He topped in the grammar examination in 1903 and also in Upadhyaya examination for Sanskrit literature in the year 1906. In 1909, he passed the Acharya (Masters) examination in Sanskrit literature with highest marks. His teachers included Vidyavachaspati Pandit Madhusudan Ojha, Pandit Kashinath Shastri, Gopinath Nanglya, Laxminath Shastri, Haridutt Jha, and Shrikrishna Shastri. His contemporary Sanskrit scholar stalwarts were likes of Vedchoodamani Pandit Moti Lal Shastri, Mahamahopaadhyaya Pandit Giridhar Sharma Chaturvedi, Vyakaranmartand Pandit Lakshminath Shastri, Vaidya Lakshmiram Swami, Rajguru Pandit Chandradutt Ojha, Pt. Sooryanaarayan Sharma, Pandit Gopinath Kaviraj and Pandit Chandradhar Sharma Guleri.

=== Family life ===
Mathuranath Shastri married thrice. In 1909, he married Savitri Devi, daughter of the royal priest of Orchha, Raghunath Dauju. Savitri Devi gave birth to three children who all died in infancy. She also expired later. His second wife Mathura Devi, daughter of Narayanrao of Ajaigarh (Madhya Pradesh) died of plague within one year of their marriage. Although grossly reluctant to remarry, on the insistence of his relatives, he married Rama Devi daughter of Pandit Gopikrishna Goswami (of Mahapura, near Jaipur), a descendant of famous Tantra scholar शिवानन्द गोस्वामी, in 1922. From Rama Devi, he had four children, including Kala Nath. Among his grandchildren are Hemant Shesh.

=== Teaching ===
Appointed by the then Director of Education Shri Shyam Sunder Sharma, Bhatt Mathuranath Shastri taught Sanskrit from 1926 to 1931 at the Maharaja College in Jaipur, where other subjects besides English and humanities were also taught. From 1931 to 1934 he was the chief examiner/ Inspector of schools run by the Maharaja of Jaipur. From 1934 to 1942 he then taught at Jaipur's Maharaja Sanskrit College, besides serving as the Head of Department of Literature. During his teaching assignment, Pandit Bhatt wrote "Sanskrit-Subodhini" (in two volumes), a unique text book of its own kind to teach Sanskrit in an extremely simple and extraordinarily interesting way. Another text book "Sulabh Sanskritam" written by Pandit Bhatt was published in 1960. For many decades 'Sulabh Sanskritam' remained the main text book prescribed by the Government of Rajasthan for learning Sanskrit. Rightly considering it to be a nationalistic cause, Pandit Bhatt was a great supporter and propagator of Hindi since his student days. On his personal initiative, Jaipur was recognised as one of the centres of examination for various diploma/ degree courses of Prathmaa, Madhyamaa (Visharad) and Uttamaa (Sahityaratna) run by the Hindi Sahitya Sammelan. For this purpose he started special night classes in a city-temple, where he himself taught the students free of cost. Despite apprehension of attracting displeasure of the British officials, Pandit Bhatt and his team of dedicated teachers including Govind Rao Kaveeshwar, continued with conducting Hindi-teaching classes.

=== Death ===
Mathuranath Shastri died of a heart attack at the age of 75 on 4 June 1964 in Jaipur. His death was termed as an "irreparable loss to the world of Sanskrit literature" and was mourned by provincial and central governments in India, various Governors, and by Sanskrit periodicals and journals.

== Major works ==
Mathuranath Shastri wrote many books, articles, essays and songs in Sanskrit, Hindi. He had started writing when he was just 14 years old and continued it until his death in 1964. His literature runs into more than one hundred thousand pages.

=== Sanskrit ===
- (1906) Ādarśaramaṇī (आदर्शरमणी) published by 'Sanskrit Ratnakar'
- (1935) Gāthāratnasamuccayaḥ (गाथारत्नसमुच्चयः)
- (1987) Gīrvāṇagirāgauravam (गीर्वाणगिरागौरवम्) publisher- Kendriya Sanskrit Vidyapeeth, Jaipur
- (1957) Govindavaibhavam (गोविन्दवैभवम्)
- (1941) Caṣakām (चषकम्): A Sanskrit commentary on the Kadambari of Bāṇabhaṭṭa published by Nirnaya Sagar Press, Bombay.
- (1947) Jayapuravaibhavam (जयपुरवैभवम्)
- (1988) Prabandhapārijātaḥ (प्रबन्धपारिजातः) publisher- Kendriya Sanskrit Vidyapeeth, Jaipur
- Bhaktibhāvano Bhagavān (भक्तिभावनो भगवान्)
- Bhāratavaibhavam (भारतवैभवम्)
- Mañjulaanāṭikā (मञ्जुला नाटिका) A radio play for All India Radio published in series 'Prakhya'-6 by Hari Singh Gaur Sagar University
- Mogalasāmrājyasūtradhāro Mānasiṁhaḥ (मोगलसाम्राज्यसूत्रधारो मानसिंहः)
- (1939) (revised in 1946)Saralā (सरला): A Sanskrit commentary on the Rasagaṅgādharam of Panditraj Jagannath published by Nirnay Sagar Press, Bombay.
- Saṁskṛtasudhā (संस्कृतसुधा): Rendering of the Prakrit Gaha Sattasai of Hāla in Sanskrit.
- (1930) Sāhityavaibhavam (साहित्यवैभवम्)

An anthology titled Mañjunāthagranthāvaliḥ (मञ्जुनाथग्रन्थावलिः) consisting of all Sanskrit works of Shastri (along with his Sanskrit commentary) has been published by the Rashtriya Sanskrit Sansthan, New Delhi.

Some of Bhatt's very important works are still unpublished. They include:

- Bharat Vaibhawam (भारतवैभवम) (in two volumes)
- Dhatuprayogaparijatah (धातुप्रयोगपारिजातः)
- Aaryaanamaadibhasha (आर्याणाम् आदिभाषा)
- Kavyakunja (काव्यकुंज)
- Rassiddhantah (रससिद्धान्तः) (partly published in 'Shodhaprabha'by Lal Bahadur Shastri Sanskrit Vidyapeeth, New Delhi
- Vinodvaatika (विनोदवाटिका)
- Sanskrit-Katha-Nikunj (संस्कृत-कथा-निकुंज)
- Bilhanstasya Kavyanch (बिल्हणस्तस्य काव्यं च)
- Kavyasiddhantah (काव्यसिद्धान्तः)
- Stutikusumanjali (स्तुतिकुसुमांजली)
- Rasgangadhar Commentary Detailed (रसगंगाधर विस्तृत व्याख्या) (detailed Commentary)

=== Editing ===
Mathuranath Shastri's massive contribution to Editing various important and classical Sanskrit books is also noteworthy. He has edited "Kadambari", "Rasgangadhar" "Sanskritgathasaptshati", "Geervaangiraagauravam", "Prabandhpaarijat", "Shilalekhlalantika", "Geetgovindam", "Sulabh Sanskritam", "Sharnagati-rahasya", Vrij-kavita-veethi", "Chaturthistav", "Chandradutta-parichaya", "Ishwarvilas-mahakavyam", "Padyamuktavali", "Vrittmuktavali" etc. He also edited prestigious Sanskrit journals and periodicals like "Sanskrit Ratnakar" (from 1904 to 1949) and "Bharati" (from 1952 to 1964).

=== Hindi ===
- (1953) Śaraṇāgati Rahasya (शरणागति रहस्य) – Elaboration of six characteristics of a Bhakta based on the characters of Vibhishana and Sugriva in Valmiki's Ramayana. Published by Gita Press, Gorakhpur.
- (1947) Braj-Kavita- Veethi – A compilation of eminent Braj Bhasha poets and their representational poetry that also includes Pandit Bhatt's poems.

=== Songs ===
Shastri wrote many songs in Sanskrit, introducing the popular folk music genre of Ghazal, and Hindustani classical music genres of Thumris, Dadras and Dhrupads into Sanskrit. He wrote Dhrupad songs in Sanskrit at the insistence of Thakur Jaidev Singh. He had a keen interest in Indian Classical Music and Rabindra Sangeet also.

== Major books published on the life and works of Bhatt Mathuranath Shastri ==
- Mañjunātha Vāgvaibhavam, 1990
- Mañjunāthagadyagauravam, 2004
- Śrī Mathurānātha Śāstriṇaḥ Kr̥titvasamīkṣaṇam, 1995
- Sanskr̥ta kē Yugapuruṣa Mañjunātha, 2004
- Mañjunāthavāgvaijayantī, Jaipur
- Bhaṭṭasmr̥ti Viśēṣāṅka, 1964
- Bhaṭṭajanmaśatābdīviśēṣāṅkaḥ, 1990
- Bhaṭṭa Mathurānāthasya Kāvyaśāstrīyā Nibandhāḥ, 2011
- Bhāratīya Sāhitya Nirmātā:Bhaṭṭa Mathurānātha Śāstrī 'Mañjunāthaḥ' (by Devarshi Kala Nath Shastry), 2013
- Mañjunātha Granthāvalī (in 5 volumes), 2009–2011
- Ādhunika Sanskr̥ta Sāhitya ēvaṁ Bhaṭṭa Mathurānātha Śāstrī, 2008

== Research on the works of Bhatt Mathuranath Shastri ==
Many scholarly research works, including those for PhD and M.Phil degrees, have been done on his works throughout India and abroad. Some of them are:

- Bhaṭṭa Śrī Mathurānātha Śāstrī: Vyaktitva ēvaṁ Kr̥titva (PhD thesis, 1975)
- Sanskr̥ta Muktakaparamparā kō Bhaṭṭajī kā Avadāna (PhD thesis, 1981)
- Bhaṭṭa Mathurānāthaśāstrikr̥ta Samasyā Sandōha (M.Phil dissertation, 1980–81)
- Sanskr̥ta Nibandha Sāhitya mēṁ Bhaṭṭajī kā Avadāna (M.Phil dissertation, 1998)
- Gōvindavaibhavam – Samīkṣātmaka Vivaraṇa (PhD thesis, 1978)

== Awards and recognition ==
=== Awards ===
- Title of "Kaviśiromaṇi" (crest jewel of poets), given in 1936 by Akhil Bhartiya Sanskrit Sahitya Sammelan through the Maharaja of Jaipur Sawai Bhawani Singh.
- Title of "Kaviśiromaṇi" (crest jewel of poets), given by the All India Sanskrit Literature Conference.
- Title of "Kavisārvabhauma" (emperor of poets), given by the Vellanaatiya Tailanga Sabha.
- Title of "Sāhityavāridhi" (ocean of literature). given by Bharat Dharma Mahamandal, Varanasi.

=== Recognition ===
Radha Vallabh Tripathi writes that Mathuranath Shastri was one of his kind in his time who started new genres, foresaw the future of Sanskrit composition and a composer of novel works and songs. Tripathi says that barring two or three poets like Mathuranath Shastri, nobody has demonstrated command over a wide variety of poetry and prose genres. He further adds that Mathuranath Shastri brought a new dawn in the field of Sanskrit literature. His outstanding contribution to Sanskrit literature has been recognised by Uttar Pradesh Sanskrit Sansthan, Lucknow in their prestigious publication "Sanskrit Vangmaya Ka Vrihad Itihas", 2004 (Edited by Pandit (Baldev Upadhyaya) by naming one of the three modern Sanskrit literature-eras as "Bhatt-Yug" (1930–1960). Kalidas Samiti in Ujjain regularly organised "Kalidas Samaroh" since 1940s. Impressed by Pandit Bhatt's poetic excellence and his deep appreciation of the aesthetics of poetry, the Kalidas Samiti honoured him at an All India Kavi Sammelan in Ujjain by calling him "Abhinav Kalidas" (modern day Kalidas). His birth anniversary is celebrated regularly by many reputed south Indian literary and academic institutions. After his name, a chair has been established in Jagadguru Ramanandacharya Rajasthan Sanskrit University Jaipur. 'Manjunath Shodh Sansthan' (C-8, Prithwi Raj Road, C-Scheme, Jaipur-302001) is active in research and publication work relating to the life and literary contribution of Bhatt Mathuranath Shastri and maintains his huge library.

== Works cited ==
- Tripathi, Radhavallabh, ed. (2012). संस्कृतविद्वत्परिचायिका – Inventory of Sanskrit Scholars (PDF). New Delhi, India: Rashtriya Sanskrit Sansthan. ISBN 978-93-8611-185-2.
- Tripathi, Radhavallabh; Shukla, Ramakant; Tripathi, Ramakant; et al., eds. (2012). आधुनिकसंस्कृतसाहित्यसन्दर्भसूची – लोकप्रियसाहित्यग्रन्थमाला ४४ [A Bibliography of Modern Sanskrit Writings] (PDF) (in Sanskrit). New Delhi, India: Rashtriya Sanskrit Sansthan. ISBN 978-93-8611-189-0. Archived from the original (PDF) on 2 May 2013.
- Tripathi, Radhavallabh; Shastri, Devarshi Kalanath; Pandey, Ramakant, eds. (2010). मञ्जुनाथग्रन्थावलिः (मञ्जुनाथोपाह्वभट्टश्रीमथुरानाथशास्त्रिणां काव्यरचनानां सङ्ग्रहः) [The works of Mañjunātha (Anthology of poetic works of Bhaṭṭaśrī Mathurānātha Śāstri, known by the pen-name of Mañjunātha)] (PDF) (in Sanskrit). New Delhi, India: Rashtriya Sanskrit Sansthan. ISBN 978-81-86111-32-1.
