= Bhavakadevi =

Bhavakadevi (IAST: Bhāvaka-devī; fl. 12th century or earlier), also known as Bhavadevi, was a Sanskrit poet from present-day India. Her verses are included in early medieval Sanskrit anthologies, including Vidyakara's Subhashita-ratna-kosha, Sadukti-karnamrita, and Kavindra-vachana-samuchchaya .

== Example verses ==
In the following verse, Bhavakadevi praises a woman's breasts using a political and military image (translation appears in Octavio Paz's In Light of India):

Her breasts are two brother kings, equal in nobility,
looking out from the same heights, side by side,
sovereigns of the vast provinces they have won
in frontier battles, with a defiant hardness.

— Bhavakadevi

Alternative translation by Daniel H. H. Ingalls:

Her breasts are brother kings, equal in nobility,
reared together till they have reached the same altitude of fame;
and from their border warfare these monarchs of vast provinces
have gained a cursed hardness.

— Bhavakadevi

Another verse expresses the feelings of a woman who becomes disillusioned with her lover after marrying him (translation by Daniel H. H. Ingalls):

At first our bodies knew a perfect oneness,
but then grew two:
the lover, you,
and I, unhappy I, the loved

Now you are husband, I the wife.
What else should come of this my life,
a tree too hard to break,
if not such bitter fruit?

— Bhavakadevi

Alternative translation by R. Parthasarathy:

How our bodies were one before!
Then they grew apart: you the lover,
And I, wretched one, the loved.

Now, you are the husband, I the wife.
A broken pledge is all that I'm left with -
A bitter fruit hard to swallow.

— Bhavakadevi
