= Marula (poet) =

Marula (IAST: Mārulā; fl. 13th century or earlier) was a Sanskrit-language poet from India. Her verses are included in early medieval Sanskrit anthologies, including Sharngadhara's Paddhati and Jalhana's Suktimuktavali.

== Date ==
Marula's verses are included in Sanskrit anthologies such as Jalhana's Suktimuktavali (13th century) and Sharngadhara's Paddhati (14th century). So, she must have lived in the 13th century or earlier, although her exact period is not certain.

She must have been a famous poet of her time, for a verse attributed to Dhanadadevas in Sharngadhara's Paddhati names her among four notable women poets:

Shilabhattarika, Vijja, Marula, and Morika are poetesses of renown with great poetic genius and erudition. Those who have command over all branches of learning, having participated in dialogues with other scholars and having defeated them in debates, are regarded as sound scholars and experts. Consequently, they alone are venerable in the scholarly world.

— Dhanadadevas, in Sharngadhara's Paddhati

== Example verses ==
Only five of Marula's verses are now extant. The following verse is about a woman separated from her lover:

Gopayanti viraha-janitam dukhamagre gurunam
Kim tvam mugdhe nayana-visritam vaspapuram runatsi
Naktam naktam nayana-salilair-esa adreekritaste
Sayyo-pantah kathayati dasam-atape sosyamanah

—Marula, quoted in Jalhana's Suktimuktavali

Hiding away your grief at separation from your beloved one,
why are you, my lovely lassie, checking the flood of tears, overflowing
your eyes? The edge of your bed, dampened night after
night by tears and dried in the sun (next morning), is bearing
evidence of your sad plight.

—Translation by J. B. Chaudhuri.
