= Achalasimha =

Ancient Indian poet

Achala-simha (IAST: Acala-siṃha) was a Sanskrit-language poet from India, who lived in the 12th century or earlier. His verses appear in several anthologies of Sanskrit poems.

== Biography ==
Achalasimha, sometimes called Achala (IAST: Acala), has been quoted in Subhashita-ratna-kosha of the 12th century anthologist scholar Vidyakara. Therefore, he must have lived in the 12th century or earlier. He may be same as the Buddhist author Achalasimha who wrote a tantric text, but this cannot be said with certainty.

Achalasimha appears to have been a well-known poet of his time. A verse in Sharngadhara-paddhati mentions him alongside other well-known poets, including Amara, Abhinanda and Kalidasa; and dismisses other poets as imitators. He is among the ten most frequently quoted poets in Vidyakara's Subhashita-ratna-kosha.

== Example verses ==
One of Achalasimha's verses, about a pearl and addressed to a young woman, is included in Vidyakara's Subhashita-ratna-kosha and Bhoja's Shringara-Prakasha. It goes like this (translated by A. K. Warder):

A person through merits may become water in the ocean from a cloud,
and through good deeds likewise he produces this state in the mouth of an oyster,
Then through better ones he finds that maturity through which
this one, spreading lustre, sports on your heart which has full breasts.

Another verse, about an angry woman, and attributed to Achalasimha by at least four anthologists (including Vidyakara, Shridhara-dasa, Jalhana and Sharangadhara), is as follows (translated by A. K. Warder):

When you were the Moon, with a lovely body having its digits complete,
then I was the image in the moonstones become moist;
Now you are the Sun, whose essence is a driving away with sharp brilliance,
and I am composed of sunstones scattering fires of anger.
