= Rajarshi =

Royal sage

Rajarshi (Sanskrit: राजर्षि, romanized: Rājarṣi, lit. 'king-sage') is a title in Hinduism and Hindu mythology, referring to a rishi (sage) who hails from a royal background.

== Description ==
A rajarshi may be described as a king (raja) who adopts a path of devotion, thereby becoming a royal sage (rishi). A rajarshi does not have to leave the kingship to become rishi, as in the example of Vishvamitra (who later becomes a Brahmarishi), but could attain the status of a sage through self-realisation during his reign. A rajarshi still performs the duties of their kshatriya class, and remain similar to most rishis, maharishis, and brahmarishis descendants in their level of spiritual knowledge. Another example of Rajarshi is King Janaka, who is said to have attained self-Knowledge from the ascetic sage Astavakra.

They belong to the four types of rishis mentioned in Hinduism and Vedas.

1. Rajarshi
2. Maharishi
3. Brahmarshi
4. Devarishi

== Literature ==
In the Ramayana, Brahma proclaims Vishvamitra to be a rajarshi in response to the sage performing austerities for a thousand years.

== See also ==
- Hindu mythology
- Hinduism
- Rajarshi Janaka
- Ramayana
