= Sri Venkateswar Steam Press =

Indian publisher

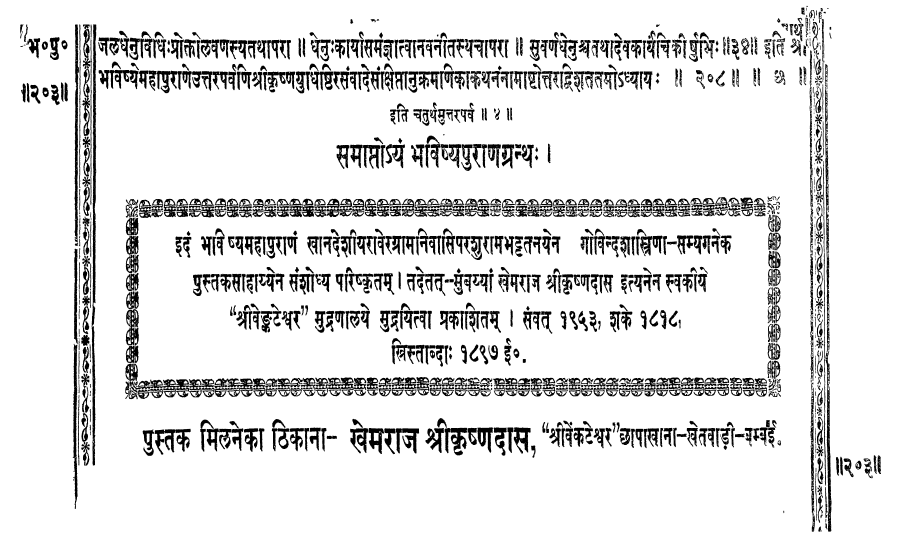
Bhavishya Purana, Khemraj Shrikrishnadas, traditional manuscript format, last folio, published in 1897

Sri Venkateswar Steam Press (Khemraj Shrikrishnadass) is one of the oldest publishers in India.

It was established by two Marwari brothers from Churu, Gangavishnu Bajaj and Khemraj Bajaj, both sons of Shrikrishnadas, who arrived in Mumbai in 1868. Initially Khemraj used to sell book by other publishers as itinerant seller. He then established a small press in 1871 at Moti Bazar Bombay. By 1880 they moved to Khetwadi and formally established Sri Venkateswar Steam Press. In 1893, the brothers separated, however Gangavishnu did not have any descendants and the properties were inherited by descendants of Khemraj.

The press has published numerous classical Hindi and Sanskrit texts, including the smallest Gita. They also published a weekly Venkateshwar Samachar for several decades. They also later started some jinning presses.

They published the earliest editions of Kalyan magazine for Geeta Press published during 1926-1927 before the press of GitaPress was itself established at Gorakhpur.

The road (Khetwadi Back Road) where the office is located is called Khemraj Shrikrishnadas Marg.

Pandit Shiya Ram Shastri from a small village named as santha naveepur district ETAH near mathura uttar pradesh after passing aacharya degree in vyakrena from kashi worked several years in this press as member of proof reading team known as sahitya mandal.

== Publications ==
Khemraj Shrikrishnadass was one of the most successful publishers during the early 20th century. Some of its publications include texts that represent the perspectives and technology prevailing in the late 19th century. Its books have often been reprinted from time to time, unfortunately generally without giving the date of the first publication.

Khemraj acquired handwritten manuscripts, asked scholars to edit the texts for possible flaws and published them.

It published a number of books written, compiled or translated by Jwala Prasad Mishra (1861-1916 CE), the head pandit at Muradabad Kameshwar Sanskrit pathshala during the early 1900s that include Panchatantra (1910), Vajasaneyi Sri Sukla Yajuevedasamhita (1912), Bihari Satsai, Dayananda-Timira-Bhaskara (1913), Jati Bhaskar (published in 1926 after death of Jwala Prasad Mishra), Maha Yakshini Sadhanam, Bindu Yoga, Rudra Ashtadhyayi, Valmiki Ramayana, Nirnaya Sindhu, Adbhuta Ramayana, Tulsi Ramayana for Ramlila, Lagana Jataka, Shiva Purana (printed vertically like palm leaf manuscript), Vishram Sagar, Ashtadash Purana Darpan, Kama Ratna, Kalpa Panchak Prayog, Purushottam Masa Mahatmya (Padma Purana), Chatirvinshati Gayatri, Shiva Gita, Shrimad Bhagawat, Shiv Sahasranama, Ganesha Gita, Devi Gita, Harivamsa Purana, Varsha Yoga Samuha. It is the publisher of several Kabir panth texts: Bijak with Commentary, Kabir Shabdavali, Complete Kabir Sagar, Kabir Krishna Gita, Kabir Upasana Paddhati, Satya Kabir ki Sakhi, Kabir Manshur, Kabir Kasauti, Kabir Upadesh, Satyanam Kabir Panthi Balopdesha. Its caste related publications include Jati Bhaskar, Kanyakubja Vanshavali (Kanya Kubja Prabodhini), Kshatriya Vanshavali.

It has published manual on a wide variety of Hindu rituals such as Davat Pujan, Mahalakshmi Puja, Gayatri Purashcharan Vidhi, Yajnopavit vidhi etc. It published Jwala Prasad Mishra's critique of Swami Dayananda's Arya-Samaja movement Dayananda-Timira-Bhaskara (1913).

== See also ==
- Hindi Granth Karyalay
