= Harnamdutt Shastri =

Indian scholar (1842–1915)

Harnamdutt Shastri (1843–1915) was a scholar of Sanskrit grammar, born in Jagadhri (in present-day Haryana), India. His father's name was Muraridutt. He received his education in Varanasi and became a Bhasyacharya (Sanskrit: instructor in the rules of language) of Sanskrit language Vyakaran Shastra (grammar). Later on he became a famous teacher of the Panini Vyakaran (rules of grammar established by Panini) based in Churu, Rajasthan. The Sanskrit school he established in Churu was known as the Pandit Harnamdutt Sanskrit Paatshala.

Prominent names amongst his students include Giridhar Sharma Chaturvedi, Vidyavachspati Balchandraji, Pandit Ramanandji Maharaj, Pandit Jaidevji Mishra and Pandit Vilasrayaji.

The Sanskrit mahakavya (epic poem), Haranamamritam is a poetic biography written by Vidyavachaspati Vidyadhar Shastri.

== Haranamamritam ==
This Mahakavya depicts the life story of the poet's grandfather Harnamdutt Shastri. It is not a glorification of his family but strives to enlighten readers about the humble and calm qualities of scholars. The poet also wishes to encourage the writing of new Sanskrit poetry. It is divided into sixteen cantos. In the first canto the poet invokes and bows before the Supreme Being, the current work is then stated to be an effort to propagate culture. In the second canto the protagonist's father Muraridutt receives advice and instructions regarding continuation of the family traditions. In the third canto the protagonist is born in Jagadhri (in present-day Haryana), soon afterwards his mother dies and he is raised by an aunt. The young boy is disinterested in studies and enjoys wrestling, his father attempts to direct the boy towards setting up his own household. In the fourth canto the young boy wins a wrestling match but is severely berated by his father. In a fit of anger he leaves his home and heads to Delhi. He loses a wrestling match in Delhi and inspired by an elderly persons’ advice, heads to Varanasi.

The fifth canto begins with a description of the spiritual aspect of Varanasi. As the chapter continues, the young man creates a favorable impression on the teachers; he interacts with fellow students who go on to become famed scholars. After completing his studies Harnamdutt continues in Varanasi as a teacher. Word of his fame as a teacher reaches his father and Muraridutt travels to Varanasi bringing along Harnamdutt's wife. Upon seeing his son established as a respected teacher, the father is greatly pleased and returns home after a brief stay. In the sixth canto the protagonist establishes his household in Varanasi. Soon a son is born; however, the happiness is cut short by the sudden death of the infant. On recovering from the tragedy, he devotes himself to prayer and studies. In the seventh canto Seth Bhagwandas Bagala of Churu visits the protagonist and implores him to establish a Sanskrit Paatshala (school) in Churu. Although hesitant at first, Harnamdutt is won over by the entreaties of the visitor and acquiesces. The chapter contains an excellent description of the desert environment's beauty.

The eighth canto covers the grand welcome to the protagonist by the residents of Churu; the Sanskrit Paatshala’s attracting students from afar and the spreading fame of Churu (Rajasthan) as a new Varanasi. The canto also describes the ideal perfection of a resident student's life. The ninth canto describes the misery caused by the famine of 1889, a prayer to Lord Shiva is organized and an unprecedented rainfall results. In the tenth canto the protagonist is accompanied by his sons and pupils on a pilgrimage. The poet describes both the hardships and blissful interludes which occur during travel through the desert. The travelers are waylaid by a band of brigands and the protagonist addresses them in a fearless manner. He advises the dacoits to become righteous warriors (kshatriyas). The eleventh canto is the heart and soul of the mahakavya. In it the protagonist instructs his sons to observe the requirements of nurturing a household (grihasta). The protagonist then proceeds to Haridwar and starts living as a hermit (vanprastha) in the siddhashrama (hermitage).

The twelfth canto describes the life of resident students at Gurukul Kangri, it also includes a listing of the protagonist's prominent students and collaborators. Next is a description of Kurukshetra where the protagonist proceeds to attend a conference of Brahmins. In the thirteenth canto the protagonist addresses the conference as the chairman, in his address he outlines the duties of a brahmin and enjoins the brahmins to carry out these obligations. The canto ends with a wish for world prosperity. In the fourteenth canto the protagonist opines that animal sacrifice has no place in a yajna (ritual offering) . In the fifteenth canto the protagonist attends a Sanskrit conference on the occasion of the Kumbha parva, the canto ends with an invocation for the propagation of Sanskrit. In the sixteenth canto we learn that the protagonist is in a sickly state and is being devotedly attended to by his pupils. The canto lists the disciples who followed in the footsteps of their guru by encouraging the growth of Indian culture. The mahakavya ends with a wish for Indian culture and traditions to be preserved eternally.
