= Vidyadhar Shastri =

Indian poet (1901–1983)

- Born: 1901; Churu, Rajasthan, India
- Died: 1983 (aged 81–82)
- Occupations: Sanskrit poet, scholar

Vidyadhar Shastri (1901–1983) was a Sanskrit poet and a scholar of Sanskrit and Hindi. He was born in the city of Churu in Rajasthan (India), received the degree of Shastri from Punjab University (Lahore), a Master of Arts in Sanskrit from the University of Agra and resided at the city of Bikaner during the bulk of his scholarly and academic endeavours. In 1962, he was conferred the honour of Vidyavachaspati by the President of India.

== Academic appointments ==
In 1928 Vidyadhar Shastri was appointed lecturer in Sanskrit at Dungar College in Bikaner and became Head, Department of Sanskrit in 1936. After retiring from Dungar College in 1956, Vidyadhar Shastri served as Head, Department of Sanskrit at Hiralal Barahsaini College, Aligarh. In 1958, he established the Hindi Vishwa Bharati (Bikaner) for the promotion of Sanskrit, Hindi and Rajasthani literature. He served as lifetime head of this institute.

== Teaching ==
In addition to being the Guru for the royal household of Bikaner, Shastri mentored and inspired many students. Prominent names of these students include Swami Narottamdas, Brahmanand Sharma, Kashiram Sharma, Krishna Mehta and Rawat Saraswat.

== Authorship ==
The Sanskrit Mahakavya (epic poem), Haranamamritam may appear at first glance to be a biography of his grandfather Harnamdutt Shastri, however, the primary purpose is to inspire its readers to devote themselves to improve the world. In the other Mahakavya, Vishwamanaviyam the poet addresses the impact of modernisation and the 1969 Moon landing. Vikramabhinnadanam illustrates the cultural traditions during the rule of Chandragupta Vikramaditya and memorialises Shankracharya, Rani Padmvati, Rana Pratap, Guru Govind Singh, Shivaji and others continuing these traditions. The Vaichitraya Lahari is an entreaty to the populace to a reflect on their unrestrained behaviour. Written in a humorous vein, the Matta Lahari's protagonist is a drunkard (matta in Sanskrit), who invites everyone to free themselves from the bonds of society and join him in the tavern. Anand Mandakini is complementary to the Matta Lahari; here the drunkard's companion exhorts him to garner some accomplishments as the time spent drinking will be irretrievable. Himadri Mahatyam was written in the year of the centennial celebration of Madan Mohan Malaviya and the Indo-China war of 1962; in the poem Madan Mohan Malaviya asks all Indians to defend the Himalaya. Shakuntala Vigyanam is a commentary on the Kalidasa play Abhigyana Shakuntalam, in which the poet illustrates that the spirit of love permeates the work.

The Shiva pushpanjali is the poet's first published work (1915); it does not used a fixed metre and also uses the style of ghazals and qawwalis. Surya Stavana was published at the same time as Shiva pushpanjali. In Lila Lahari the poet acquaints the reader with all the branches of Indian philosophy with Advaita being the fundamental form.

=== Purnanandanam ===
The Sanskrit play Purnanandanam is based on a popular folk tale; the protagonist Purnamala is the son born to the King of Sialkot but due to adverse astrological signs has to be sent away for sixteen years. During this interval the king takes another (younger) wife named Naveena. When Purnamala returns Naveena is attracted to him; however, Purnamala rejects her advances. Miffed, Naveena causes the King to sentence Purnamala to death on charges of attempted rape. Purnamala is taken to the forest to be beheaded, instead the executioners throw him down a well. Guru Gorakhnath and his followers rescue Purnamala from the well. After receiving education from the Guru, Purnamala is instructed to return to Sialkot. On Purnamala's return to the palace, the now aged King breaks down in tears and hugs Purnamala. At the beseeching of Purnamala's mother, Guru Gorakhnath manifests at the palace. He instructs Purnamala to stay in Sialkot until Naveena's son capable of taking the reins of power.

This play celebrates the superiority of leading a spiritual life over the pursuit of material wealth.

== Awards and honours ==
- Felicitated (with other Sanskrit scholars) by the President of India, Dr Rajendra Prasad at the Vishwa Sanskrit Parishad, Varanasi.
- Received the honour of Vidyavaschaspati from Sarvapalli Radhakrishnan in 1962 at the golden anniversary celebration of the Akhil Bharatiya Sanskrit Sammelan.
- Bestowed the honour of Manishi by the Rajasthan Sahitya Academy, Udaipur.
- Honored as a Sanskrit scholar by the President of India Shri V.V. Giri in 1972 at the silver anniversary celebration of India's independence.
- Honored as Kavi Smarat by the Akhil Bharatiya Sanskrit Prachar Sabha
- In 1980 received public felicitation at a ceremony under the auspices of the Bharatiya Vidya Mandir in Bikaner
- Honored at the 1982 Harit Rishi memorial felicitation by the Maharana Mewar foundation in recognition of outstanding service to development of culture

== Bibliography ==
=== Sanskrit Mahakavya ===
- Haranamamritam
- Vishwamanaviyam

=== Sanskrit poems ===
- Vikramabhinnadanam
- Vaichitraya Lahari
- Matta Lahari
- Anand Mandakini
- Himadri Mahatyam
- Shakuntala Vigyanam
- Alidurg Darshanam

=== Stavanakavya (Songs of praise) ===
- Shiva pushpanjali
- Surya Stavana
- Lila Lahari

=== Plays in Sanskrit ===
- Purnanandanam
- Kalidainyam
- Durbala Balam

=== Champu Kavya ( a Champu contains both poetry and prose) ===
- Vikramabhyudayam

=== Collected works ===
- Vidyadhar granthavali, introduction by Vishnudutt Sharma, Publisher : Rajasthan Sahitya Akadami, Udaipur 1977

=== Edited work ===
- Krishnagitavali (poems about Krishna by Tulsidas), Editors: Narottamdas Swami and Vidyadhar Shastri, Published 1931

== Source material ==
- Sarasvat, Parmanand (1984) Sahityasrashta Shri Vidyadhar Shastri, Ganu Prakashan, Bikaner
