= Hanuman Prasad Poddar =

Indian saint, Devotee and writer

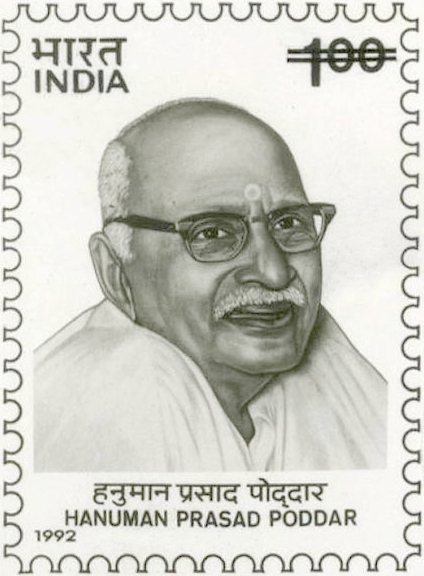
- 1992 stamp of Shri Hanuman Prasad ji Poddar
- Born: 18 September 1892; Ratangarh, Rajputana Agency, British India
- Died: 26 March 1971 (aged 78); Gorakhpur, Uttar Pradesh, India
- Occupations: Author, Journalist
- Writing career
- Language: Hindi
- Years active: 1923–1971
- Subject: Devotion

Hanuman Prasad Poddar (18 September 1892 – 22 March 1971) was an Indian Bhakt, Devotee, independence activist, littérateur, magazine editor and philanthropist. He was the founding editor of the spiritual magazine, Kalyan which was published by Gita Press. His work in fostering pride among the people regarding India's history and philosophical tradition earned him praise from M.K. Gandhi. He was affectionally called "Bhai Ji" or "Lovingly Brother". The Government of India issued a postage stamp in his memory in 1992.

== Early life ==
Poddar was born into a Marwadi Agrawal Bania trading family in Ratangarh, Rajasthan, India.

== Gita Press and Kalyan ==
The publishing house of Gita Press was founded by Poddar. It rose in popularity due to its affordability and accurate translations of Hindu texts, alongside commentaries by the translator or author. His publishing house also started the monthly Kalyan magazine that contained treatise on the Ramayana and Puranas. The main aim of Gita Press was to promote the principles of 'Sanatan Dharma'. Gita Press archives contain over 3,500 manuscripts including over 100 interpretations of the Bhagwad Gita.

== Relations with Gandhi ==
Poddar and M.K. Gandhi fostered a close relationship in the early years of the struggle for Independence. In a 1935 letter, Gandhi even expressed great satisfaction at his views. Poddar became heavily involved in Congress party activities, participating in protests, getting arrested and attending Congress sessions.

However, their relationship began to sour in 1932, when Gandhi began a fast unto death advocating temple entry rights for untouchables. Gandhi's fast prompted the public to support him by opening temples to untouchables and organizing inter-caste dining events. Poddar made his displeasure known to Gandhi through a series of letters, arguing that untouchability and the four-fold varna system were integral parts of Hinduism. He urged Gandhi to put an end to the anti-caste struggle amongst his supporters. Gandhi responded by refuting Poddar's views and expressed the belief that the followers of sanatan dharma were to blame for social ailments like untouchability. Although both continued to maintain warm relations, following this disagreement, Poddar began to move away from Gandhi and his movement, instead regularly criticizing him in his magazine Kalyan.

== Alleged Involvement in Gandhi's Assassination ==
Poddar began to distance himself from the Congress movement after falling out with Gandhi. Instead, he began to move closer to organisations like the Hindu Mahasabha and RSS. He was among the key organisers of the Mahasabha's annual convention in Gorakhpur in 1946.

On 30 January 1948, Gandhi was assassinated in Delhi's Birla House by Nathuram Godse who was associated with the Hindu Mahasabha and RSS. Poddar's associations with these organizations coupled with his strong criticisms on Gandhi through his magazine Kalyan, made him a suspect in Gandhi's assassination. Following Gandhi's assassination, 25,000 people throughout the country, including Poddar, were arrested.
