= Lilasuka =

Author of an important poem about Krishna

Līlāśuka, whose original name was Bilavamangalam, is the author of the romantic poem Kṛśṇa-karaṇāmṛta (The Ear-nectar about Krishna) which deals with the early life of Krishna among the cow-herds, with his companions. Līlāśuka probably at King Kulaśekhara’s court (c.900 A.D.) wrote this popular lyric on Krishna as the sexually precocious infant loved by all women but interpreted as symbolising God attracting all souls, thus an early example of Vaishnava devotional kāvya. This work exists in two recensions, the southern and the western and is the canonical text of the Gaudiya Vaishnavas.

Kṛśṇa-karaṇāmṛta is a devotional anthology of mediaeval lyric and passionate stanzas in śārdūlavikrīdita metre in honour of Krishna. It is a favourite and authoritative eulogistic work, familiar among gesture-dancers. The earliest firm date of this work is about 1367 in Gangādevi’s Madhurā-vijaya, but the date of the author is uncertain. The Sanskrit poetry of Lilasuka and Jayadeva (author of Gita Govinda), created a new aesthetics of bhakti, based on a revaluation of the literary category of rasa by elaborating the vocabulary of kama and prema creatively mingling erotic love and devotion. There is deep mysticism in the poem.

Lilasuka probably hailed from a southern part of India as is indicated by the metre used by him, but it is not established whether this poem was written by Bilavamangala, the noted grammarian of the 12th or 13th century, or by Bilavamangala who lived in the 9th century. Chaitanya Mahaprabhu obtained only the authentic first canto out of the three that existed. The very surname Lilasuka of the poet, is an evidence of the Bhagavata cult introduced by Madhvacharya in the West Coast, which identifies the poet with the second Bilavamangala. It is said that Lilasuka was born in Kerala near Parur in the late 13th or14th century, and lived for eighty years; that his mellifluous Sanskrit mingled with the ecstatic love for Krishna invests his songs with a quality so rare that when sung they are nectar to the ears, and that he left a life of sensuous infatuation with a courtesan named Chintāmani for intense devotion to God.
