= Devarishi =

Devarishi (Sanskrit: देवर्षि, lit. 'the celestial sage'), is one of the three categories of Rishis, the other two being – Brahmarishi (ब्रह्मर्षि) and Rajarishi (राजर्षि). Rajarishis were those Kshatriya kings who gained the status of Rishi; the difference between a Rishi and a Brahmarishi was that of the degree of penance and accomplishment, and their life-span.

== Etymology ==
Vāyu Purāņa (LXI.79-92) tells us that the root - ऋष, from which the word ऋषि (Rishi) is derived, is used in the sense of motion (Knowledge), hearing truth and austerity, and gives the marks of a Devarishi. It states that seers living in the celestial regions should be known as the blessed Devarishis, and also those who are distinguished by their knowledge of the past, present and future and strict adherence to truth; they are the revealers of Mantra and by virtue of their Siddhis ('supernatural powers') have unrestricted access everywhere. The same text earlier states that:-

देवर्षी धर्मपुत्रौ तु नरनारायणावुभौ |
वालखिल्याः क्रतोः पुत्राः कर्दमः पुलहस्य तु ||
पर्वतो नारदश्चैव कश्यपस्यात्मजावुभौ |
ऋषन्ति देवान् यस्मात्ते तस्माद्देवर्षयः स्मृताः ||

the two sons of Dharma, Nara and Nārāyaņa; Kratu’s sons, collectively known as Vālakhilyas; Kardama, son of Pulaha; Parvata, Nārada and the two sons of Kaśyapa, Asita and Vatsara, are called Devarishis because they can exercise control even over the celestials.
