= Kaumudi-Mahotsava =

Sanskrit play, possibly 3rd or 4th century CE

Kaumudi-Mahotsava (IAST: Kaumudīmahotsava, "Festival of Moonlight") is a Sanskrit play of uncertain date, known from a single manuscript discovered in the present-day state of Kerala, India. The portion of the manuscript that likely contained the playwright's name is damaged, but the name appears to be feminine—some scholars interpret it as "Vijjakaya"—though this remains uncertain. Several scholars have made attempts to identify the play's characters with historical figures, but most modern scholars consider it a work of fiction.

The play narrates the story of prince Kalyanavarman of Magadha, whose adopted brother Chandasena forms an alliance with the rival Licchavis, and treacherously attacks Magadha. Kalyanavarman's father Sundaravarman dies in the attack, and his mother Madiravati commits suicide by self-immolation. The orphaned young prince is taken to safety by his nurse Vinayandhara and other loyalists, and spends several years in exile in the Vindhya forest. When he grows up, his loyal minister Mantragupta instigates the Shabhara and the Pulinda tribes to rebel against Chandasena, and while Chandasena is busy curbing the revolt, stages a coup in the capital Pataliputra. Chandasena is killed, and Kalyanavarman becomes the new king. He marries the Shurasena princess Kirtimati, whom he had met during his exile.

== Authorship and date ==
Kaumudi-Mahotsava was discovered from a single manuscript from Kerala. The manuscript was partially damaged by worms and had a hole at the place that appears to state the beginning of the author's name in the prologue. The visible part of the author's name can be read as ("-kayā"); the ending syllable suggests that this is a feminine name. Scholar Manavalli Ramakrishna Kavi (1866-1957) saw the remains of what he believed to be "ja", and read the name as "jakayā", although Indologist A. K. Warder finds this reading doubtful.

Based on Kavi's reading and the space occupied by the hole, some scholars have theorized that the author was "Vijjakayā", identifying her with the poet Vijja, who in turn, is sometimes identified with Vijaya, the daughter-in-law of the 7th century Chalukya king Pulakeshin II. However, Warder notes that the word could have been another name, such as "Morikayā". Alternatively, the broken word may not be a name at all: it is possible that the sentence containing it states that "the play was composed with a sub-plot patākayā".

An analysis of the play's style and language indicates that it was definitely not authored by Vijja: the play resembles the works of earlier authors such as Bhasa (3rd or 4th century). It may have been composed somewhat later by an imitative writer, but it is highly unlikely to have been composed as late as the 9th (or even the 6th) century.

== Plot ==
=== Act I ===
Kalyanavarman, the exiled prince of Magadha, is living in the hermitage of Jabali, near Lake Pampa in the Vindhyas. His loyal minister Mantragupta is living in disguise in Pataliputra, the capital of Magadha. Once, while sitting under an Ashoka tree near the temple of goddess Chandika, the prince recalls his childhood, and wonders if his memories are a dream or an illusion. Meanwhile, Kirtimati, the beautiful daughter of the Shurasena king Kirtisena, visits the temple. She rests under the same Ashoka tree and is romantically attracted to Kalayanavarman.

Yogasiddhi, a nun and the guide of Kirtimati, informs her that her residence in the hermitage is ready. As the princess leaves, she glances at Kalyanavarman in a way that makes her passion for him evident. Meanwhile, Vaikhanasa, Kalyanavarman's jester (vidushaka) arrives, and informs him that Mantragupta's plan is going well. The prince describes princess Kirtimati to him, but the fool thinks of this encounter as the final disaster to strike the prince after the loss of the kingdom. Vaikhanasa sees what he thinks is a heap of rice, but turns out to be a broken pearl necklace dropped by the princess. At this time, the prince is called for his mid-day exercise.

=== Act II ===
Princess Kirtimati becomes infatuated with Kalyanavarman, and unable to sleep, paints his portrait. The prince also becomes lovesick and starts neglecting his meals.

Yogasiddhi becomes concerned at the state of the princess. Meanwhile, she recalls her own past: she became a nun after her family suffered a disaster, and came to the Shurasena capital Mathura, where the Queen liked her and made her the caregiver of the princess. As Yogasiddhi thinks about her past, a hawk grabs the portrait of Kalyanavarman and drops it near her. Yogasiddhi recognizes Kalyanavarman, and recalls that she used to be his nurse when he was a young boy: she became a nun after his family lost the throne of Magadha. Yogasiddhi faints, and is revived by Kirtimati's confidante Nipunika. Yogasiddhi vows to unite the lovers, and writes a verse on the painting, declaring that Kirtimati is as worthy of Kalyanavarman, as Bandhumati of Shaunaka, and Kurangi of the Avimaraka (characters from well-known stories).

Meanwhile, Vaikhanasa comes to the residence of the princess, and returns the pearl necklace to Nipunika. Yogasiddhi recognizes him and gives him the portrait of Kalyanavarman.

=== Act III ===
The prince asks Vaikhanasa about Kirtimati's necklace. Vaikhanasa pretends to have lost it, and instead shows him the painting. The prince paints a portrait of Kirtimati beside his portrait, while Vaikhanasa tells him about Yogasiddhi, the writer of the verse, being his childhood nurse.

=== Act IV ===
In Pataliputra, Mantragupta's agents prepare for a coup against the usurper Chandasena, who is busy dealing with a diversion organized at the frontier by Mantragupta. (Mantragupta had instigated the Shabhara and the Pulinda tribes to rebel against Chandasena).

Kalyanavarman's loyalists plan to appoint him as the new king. The son of the chaplain of Kalyanavarman's father narrates how Chandasena usurped the power: An adopted son of Kalyanavarman's father Sundaravarman, he entered into a marriage alliance with Licchavis, the enemies of the Magadha dynasty. He subsequently attacked Magadha: in the ensuing conflict, Sundaravarman and several of his ministers were killed. Queen Madiravati, the mother of Kalyanavarman, suicide by self-immolation. Chandasena conquered the capital, and became the new ruler of Magadha. The orphaned prince Kalyanavarman escaped the capital with his nurse Vinayandhara and other loyalists, including the sons of the ministers.

Mantragupta describes the evening in Pataliputra, and at night, he receives the news that Kalayanavarman will arrive in the city in the morning. He sends the Chaplain's son to Mathura to arrange Kirtimati's marriage to the prince, as a surprise gift for the prince at his coronation. A voice then proclaims the arrival of the prince, and the coup starts at daybreak.

=== Act V ===
The audience learn that Kalyanavarman has conquered the kingdom, Chandasena has been killed, and the celebrations are being organized. A gambler returning from Mathura states that Kirtisena is sending Kirtimati to Pataliputra. Meanwhile, Kalyanavarman longs for Kirtimati, not realizing that she is already in Pataliputra, where Yogasiddhi has hidden in the grove of the Suganga palace.

Kirtisena's chaplain enters the court, and announces that Kirtisena has offered to marry Kirtimati to Kalyanavarman. He presents the pearl necklace (mentioned in Act I) to Kalyanavarman, and narrates the story of its origin as follows: the necklace was made from the temples of an elephant killed by Arjuna during the Bharata battle. Arjuna appointed at Vrishni prince as the king of Shurasena, and gave the necklace to him. The necklace was inherited by the present-day royals of Mathura. Kalyanavarman wears the necklace and visits the grove, where Nipunika brings Kirtimati to him.

The drama is said to have been staged on the occasion of the coronation of Kalyanavarman, on a full-moon day, resulting in the name of the play ("Full-Moon Festival").

== Historicity ==
Historian Edward Aloysius Pires connected the play's characters with the Maukhari rulers, whose names ended in -varman. Pires identified Chandasena as the Gupta king Chandragupta I (who married a Licchavi princess). According to Pires, the play was commissioned by a Maukhari ruler named Kalyanavarman, on the occasion of his coronation in 326 CE. However, this identification is not corroborated by any concrete historical evidence. No Maukhari rulers (or any other rulers named Sundaravarman, Kalyanavarman and Chandasena) are known to have ruled Magadha during the 3rd or 4th centuries.

Historian K. P. Jayaswal theorized that Sundaravarman's family was another dynasty that ruled Magadha before the Guptas. He identified Chandasena as Chandragupta I, and Kalyanavarman as a prince of the Kota family, which was subjugated by Chadnragupta's son Samudragupta. However, this identification is incorrect, as the play explicitly states that Chandasena was killed and his dynasty ended when the forces loyal to Kalyanavarman conquered the capital. Chandragupta lived to an old age, and passed on the throne to his son. Moreover, the play does not describe Sundaravarman or Kalyanavarman as members of the Kota family. Jayaswal's theory has been rejected by most scholars.

Numismatist P. L. Gupta identified Sundaravarman and Kalyanavarman as the last two kings of the Satavahana dynasty. He interpreted "Karniputra", a word mentioned in the play, as "Satakarni-putra" (Satakarni was a title common to several Satavahana kings). However, "Karniputra" is actually a typo in the manuscript - the play mentions "Karni-patra" (the leaves of karnikara), which had been used to make the victory arches. Moreover, no Satavahana king had a name ending in -varman, and no historical source describes the Satavahana dynasty as Magadha-kula (which, according to the play, was the name of Kalyanavarman's dynasty).

Several other scholars have determined that Sundaravarman (or Sundaravarma) and Kalyanavarman (or Kalyanavarma) are not historical figures at all, and have categorized the drama as a work of fiction.

== See also ==
- List of Sanskrit plays in English translation
