= Nudurupati Venkanna =

Nudurupati Venkanna was a Telugu and Sanskrit poet from the Pudukkottai kingdom. He is known for the creation of the Telugu lexicon Andhra Bhasharnavamu and the Tondaman Vamsavali, a detailed chronicle of the Pudukkottai kingdom.

== Life ==
Venkanna was born in the distinguished Telugu-speaking Nudurupati family of Pudukkottai. His father Sitharamaiah was also a poet and bore the title Uddanda Kavi.

== Literary works ==
Venkanna's important works are Andhra Bhasharnavamu, Parvathi Kalyanamu, Raghunathivamu, Mallupuranamu, Brhannayika Dandakamu and Tondaman Vamsavali.

Andhra Bhasharnavamu is a comprehensive Telugu lexicon which is popular in the Tamil as well as Telugu country. It is composed of a total of 3 parts and is the biggest Telugu lexicon ever written. His Raghunathivamu is a Sanskrit work on Alankaras and dedicated to Venkanna's contemporary and patron Raghunatha Raya Tondaiman. Parvathi Kalyanamu is a Yakshagana on the marriage of Shiva and Parvathi while Mallupuranamu is a Telugu work on the Malla community, the only one of its kind. Brhannayika Dandakamu is a Telugu poem on Raghunatha Raya Tondaiman and is considered to be Venkanna's best composition.

=== Tondaman Vamsavali ===
The literary work for which Venkanna is most popular in the Tondaman Vamsavali, a 333 line poem on the history of the Tondaiman dynasty of Pudukkottai. Published in 1914, the vamsavali is considered to be the most comprehensive source of history on Pudukkottai.
