= West Bengal Societies Registration Act, 1961 =

Indian legislation

West Bengal Societies Registration Act, 1961.
- Long title: An Act to provide for the registration of literary, cultural, scientific, political, charitable, religious and certain other kinds of societies and for matters connected therewith.
- Citation: XXVI of 1961
- Status: In force

The West Bengal Societies Registration Act, 1961 is an Act of the West Bengal Legislative Assembly, of West Bengal state in India. The Act was passed by the West Bengal Legislature. It was an act to provide for the registration of societies or NGOs whose head office had to be situated in the state of West Bengal. Before this act, the societies in West Bengal were registered under the Societies Registration Act. The act is accompanied by the West Bengal Societies Registration Rules, 1963.
