= Gita Press =

Indian Hindu religious publishing house

- Logo
- Status: Active
- Founded: May 3, 1923; 103 years ago
- Founder: Jay Dayal Goyanka; Ghanshyam Das Jalan
- Country of origin: India
- Headquarters location: Gorakhpur, Uttar Pradesh
- Distribution: Worldwide
- Publication types: Hindu Religious Books and Kalyan Masik
- Nonfiction topics: Hinduism
- No. of employees: 350
- Official website: www.gitapress.org

Gita Press is an Indian books publishing company, headquartered in Gorakhpur, Uttar Pradesh, India, and considered to be the world's largest publisher of Hindu religious texts. It was founded in 1923 by Jaya Dayal Goyanka, Hanuman Prasad Poddar, and Ghanshyam Das Jalan with the intention to make sacred texts easily accessible to the general public.

Publication began in 1927 with a monthly Hindi magazine titled Kalyan. Since its establishment, the Gita Press has published over 417 million books in 14 different languages. Gita Press was conferred with the Gandhi Peace Prize of 2021, by the Government of India.

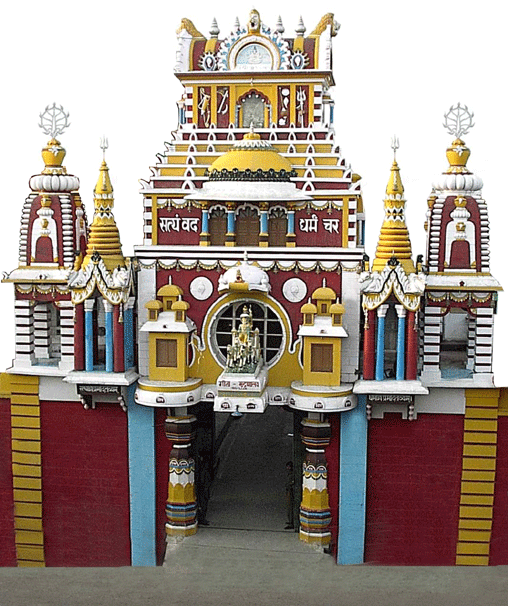
Gita Press office gate in Gorakhpur

== History ==
Gita Press was established on 29 April 1923 in Gorakhpur, Uttar Pradesh, India by Jaya Dayal Goyanka, Hanuman Prasad Poddar, and Ghanysham Das Jalan. The vision of the Gita Press was to provide affordable translations and commentaries of sacred texts for the general public. To launch the press, Goyanka worked with fellow businessmen in Gorakhpur. Formal publication began in 1927 with a monthly Hindi magazine, Kalyan.

Gita Press is a unit of Gobind Bhawan Karyalaya registered under the Societies Registration Act, 1860 (presently governed by the West Bengal Societies Act, 1961)

In 2019, it was estimated that the Gita Press produced 141 million copies of the Bhagavad Gita, 108 million copies of the Ramcharitmanas, 25 million copies of the Puranas and Upanishads, 5 million copies of the Hanuman Chalisa, and 198 million copies of smaller book, and 160 million copies of various booklets and pamphlets.

== Branches ==
Gita Press has branches and outlets throughout India and one location in Nepal.

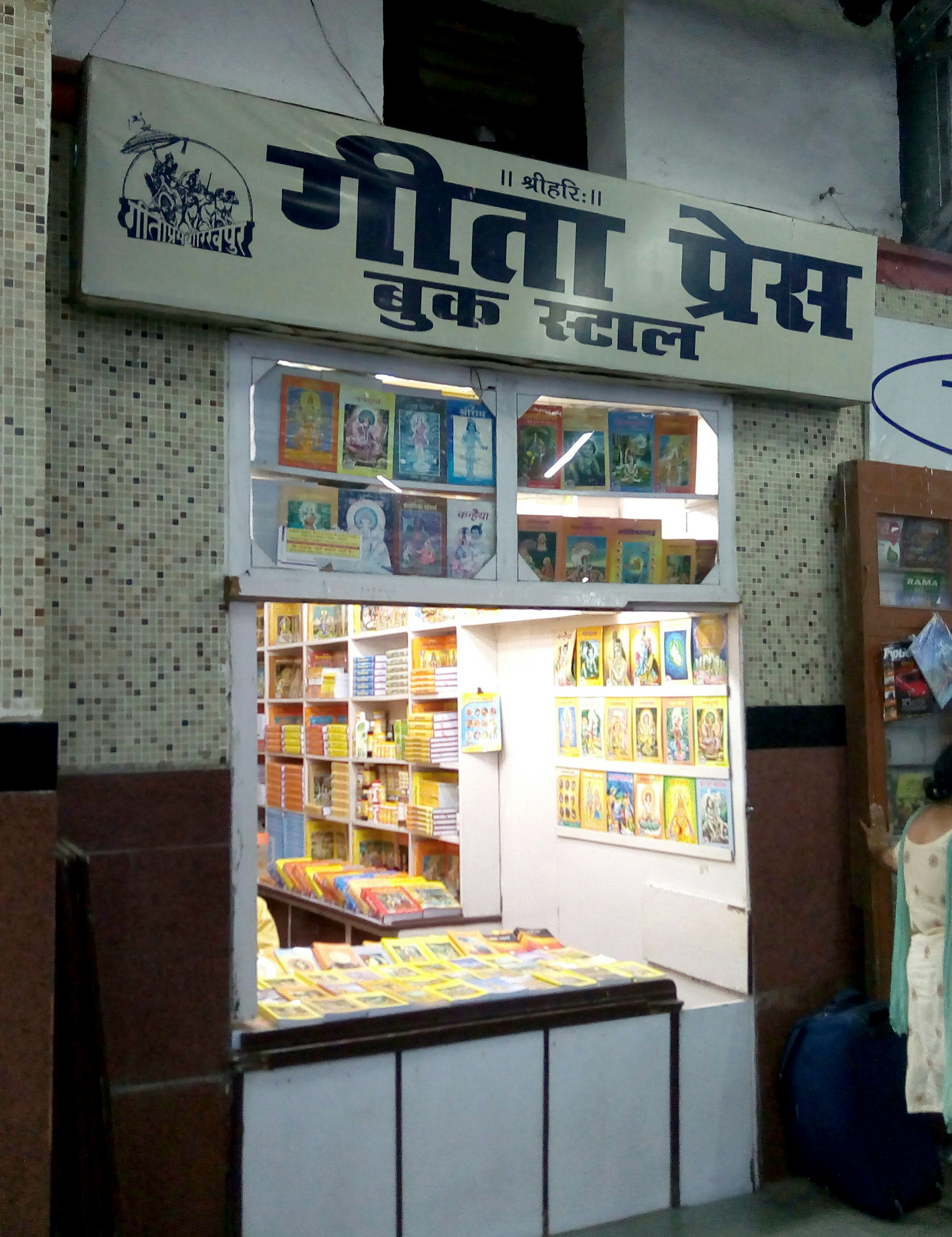
Gita Press Gorakhpur outlet at Kanpur Railway Statio

Branches	State	Address
Bengaluru	Karnataka	7/3, 2nd Cross, Lalbagh Road, Bangalore – 560027
Bhilwara	Rajasthan	G-7, Aakar Tower, C Block, Opp. Harsh Palace, Gandhi Nagar, Bhilwara – 311001
Chennai	Tamil Nadu	Electro House No. 23, Ramanathan Street, Kilpauk, Chennai – 600010
Coimbatore	Tamil Nadu	Gita Press Mansion 8/1 M, Racecourse, Coimbatore – 641018
Cuttack	Odisha	Bharatiya Towers, Badam Badi, Cuttack – 753009
Delhi	Delhi	2609, Nayi Sarak, Delhi – 110006
Gorakhpur	Uttar Pradesh	Gita Press, P.O. Gita Press, Gorakhpur – 273005
Haridwar	Uttarakhand	Sabjimandi, Motibazar, Haridwar – 249401
Hyderabad	Telangana	41, 4-4-1, Dilshad Plaza, Sultan Bazar, Hyderabad – 500095
Indore	Madhya Pradesh	G-5, Shree Vardhan, 4 R.N.T. Marg, Indore – 452001
Jalgaon	Maharashtra	7, Bhim Singh Market, Near Railway Station, Jalgaon – 425001
Kanpur	Uttar Pradesh	24/55, Birhana Road, Kanpur – 208001
Kathmandu	Nepal	P84X+J3G, Pashupatinath Marg, Kathmandu 44600, Nepal
Kolkata	West Bengal	151, Mahatma Gandhi Road, Kolkata – 700007
Mumbai	Maharashtra	282, Samaldas Gandhi Marg (Princess Street), Near Marine Lines Station, Mumbai – 400002
Nagpur	Maharashtra	Shriji Kripa Complex, 851, New Etawari Road, Nagpur – 440002
Patna	Bihar	Ashok Rajpath, Opposite Women's Hospital, Patna – 800004
Raipur	Chhattisgarh	Mittal Complex, Ganjpara, Telghani Chowk, Raipur – 492009
Ranchi	Jharkhand	Cart Sarai Road, Upper Bazar, First Floor Birla Gaddi, Ranchi – 834001
Rishikesh	Uttarakhand	Gita Bhavan, P.O. Swargashram, Rishikesh – 249304
Surat	Gujarat	Vaibhav Apartment, Opposite Nutan Niwas, Bhatar Road, Surat – 395001
Varanasi	Uttar Pradesh	59/9, Nichibag, Varanasi – 221001

== Gita Press Leela Chitra Mandir ==
The Gita Press Leela Chitra Mandir, or art gallery, is located at the Gorakhpur Gita Press location, was inaugurated by India's first president, Rajendra Prasad. Around 684 paintings portray the life and teachings of Rama and Krishna. Other paintings, including Mewari style paintings of the Krishna Lila are also on exhibit. Other artifacts, such as letters by Mahatma Gandhi and ancient copies of the Bhagavad Gita, are preserved here.

== Recognitions ==
In 2021, Gita Press was awarded the Gandhi Peace Prize by India Prime Minister Narendra Modi.

== See also ==
- Hanuman Prasad Poddar
- Sri Venkateswar Steam Press
