= Vidyakara =

Buddhist scholar

Vidyakara (c. 1050–1130) was a Buddhist scholar and poetry anthologist, noted for the Sanskrit poetry compilation Subhashita-ratna-kosha (IAST: Subhāṣitaratnakoṣa), which has been considered the "most celebrated" anthology of Sanskrit verse. Most of the verses, where authorship is noted, range over the two centuries prior to compilation; hence it may be thought of as a compilation of "modern verse" for the period.

Little is known about Vidyakara himself. D. D. Kosambi has argued compellingly that Vidyakara was a senior monk at the Jagaddala Vihara monastery in North Bengal, based on evidence including markings on the palm-leaf manuscript of an earlier edition of the work, claimed to be Vidyakara's original, of what may have been shelfmarks from the library in Jagaddala.

== Subhashitaratnakosha ==
Two different versions of Subhashita-ratna-kosha ("Treasury of Well-Turned Verse") exist. The manuscripts were lost in Bengal during the Islamic period. Late in the 19th century, a palm leaf manuscript was located in Ngor monastery in Tibet. This is now considered to be the first edition, compiled in the later years of the 1090s. Kosambi has argued that this manuscript may even be the original of Vidyakara, and that it constitutes the first edition of the compilation. Vidyakara's first edition was published by F. W. Thomas in 1912 under the title Kavindra Vachana Samucchaya. Some of the verses in the palm leaf contain some additional annotations, and Kosambi has argued for these being shelfmarks, possibly from the library at Jagaddala, where Vidyakara may have done the research to locate the verses.

A second manuscript, in paper, was located in the private collection of the Nepalese rajaguru (royal priest), Pundit Hemaraja. This is believed to be the second edition, compiled by no later than 1130. A second version, with 1,732 poems, was located later in a paper manuscript in Ngor monastery in Tibet. The first version is considered to be an earlier edition of the final compilation; it is felt that Vidyakara may have devoted many years to creating this compilation. The definitive text of this second edition was edited by D. D. Kosambi and V. V. Gokhale, as Volume 42 of the Harvard Oriental Series in 1957. Kosambi prepared a long introduction regarding the provenance of the collection, though he critiqued the poetry as being inferior, having come from a stagnant period without class struggle.

Daniel Ingalls translated the verses into English over six years, with suggestions from Kosambi and Gokhale. The translation was published as Volume 44 of the Harvard Oriental Series in 1965.

=== Poets ===
Many of the authors in the Subhashitaratnakosha are not identified. Of the 275 identified names, only eleven seem to be earlier than the 7th century. Based on other sources, Ingalls' translation includes the names of several authors, both confirmed and probable, not named by Vidyakara.

Thus, the selection has a distinctly modernist tenor. Though the most popular are well-known poets from recent centuries: Rajashekhara, Murari, and Bhavabhuti. Many of the favoured authors - Vallana, Yogeshvara, Vasukalpa, Manovinoda, Abhinanda were all Bengalis or at least easterners of the Pala kingdom, the core of which comprised Bengal and Bihar. These authors are all more or less contemporaneous or just preceding Vidyakara. Among the less frequently quoted authors are many Pala princes of state and church whose verses are not found in any other extant work. Among them are Dharmapala, Rajyapala, Buddhakaragupta, Khipaka, and Jnanashri. Though Vidyakara quotes verses of classical authors like Kalidasa, Rajashekhara, and Bhavabhuti, according to Ingalls, he shows a "special predilection for eastern or Bengali poets".

Some of these authors were contemporaries of Vidyakara, and it is possible he may have known them. In addition to the Jagaddala Vihara, he is certain to have had access to the libraries at the five major viharas across Eastern India, since there was considerable mobility among scholars between these state-managed campuses.

The most frequently quoted authors in the text are:

Poet	Approximate period (CE)	Number of stanzas
Rajashekhara	900	101
Murari	800-900	56
Bhavabhuti	725	47
Vallana	900-1100	42
Yogeshvara	800-900	32
Bhartṛhari	400	25
Vasukalpa	950	25
Manovinoda	900-1100	23
Bana	600-650	21
Achala(simha)	700-800?	20
Abhinanda	850-900	20
Dharmakirti	700	19
Viryamitra	900-1100	17
Lakshmidhara	1000-1050	16

=== Themes ===
Although Vidyakara may have been a Buddhist monk, the dominant theme in the collection is that of love poetry, many of them decidedly erotic in tone. The book is compiled into thematic sections. Opening with verses on the Bodhisattvas (most of them composed by professors and others at the Viharas, near contemporaries), the text also includes several sections on Hindu topics (Shiva, Vishnu). Vidyakara included more verses in praise of the Hindu gods than he did of the Buddha. Subsequent sections quickly slip into the romantic mode, with several chapters dealing with the seasons, messengers, different periods of the day.

A later compilation, Shridharadasa's Saduktikarnamrta (1205), also from the Bengal region, has considerable overlap with Vidyakara (623 verses out of 2377). Though it is larger, the aesthetic discernment of Vidyakara has been greatly admired.

The volume of translations by Ingalls is the most complete version in English; the poetic quality of the translations is high. Selected poems in the collection have also been translated by many others.

Following is a list of 50 section titles from Ingalls' translation:

1. The Buddha
2. The Bodhisattva Lokeshvara
3. The Bodhisattva Manju-ghosha
4. Shiva
5. Shiva's Household
6. Vishnu
7. The Sun
8. Spring
9. Summer
10. The Rains
11. Autumn
12. Early Winter
13. Late Winter
14. Kama
15. Adolescence
16. Young Women
17. The Blossoming of Love
18. Words of the Female Messenger
19. Love in Enjoyment
20. The Evidence of Consummation
21. The Woman Offended
22. The Lady Parted from her Lover
23. The Lover Separated from his Mistress
24. The Wanton
25. The Lady's Expression of Anger at her Messenger
26. The Lamp
27. Sunset
28. Darkness
29. The Moon
30. Dawn
31. Midday
32. Fame
33. Allegorical Epigrams
34. Breezes
35. Characterizations
36. Greatness
37. Good Men
38. Villains
39. Poverty and Misers
40. Substantiations
41. Flattery of Kings
42. Discouragement
43. Old Age
44. The Cremation Ground
45. The Hero
46. Inscriptional Panegyrics
47. Mountains
48. Peace
49. Miscellaneous
50. Praise of Poets
