= Rajashekhara (Sanskrit poet) =

10th century poet writing in Maharashtri Prakrit and Sanskrit

- Occupations: Poet, dramatist and critic
- Spouse: Avantisundari
- Father: Durduka

Rajashekhara (IAST: Rājaśekhara; fl. 10th century) was a Maharashtri Prakrit and Sanskrit poet, dramatist and critic. He was the court poet of the Pratiharas of Kannauj.

== Life ==
In his Bālarāmāyaṇa and Kāvyamimāṃsā, Rajashekhara referred himself by his family name Yāyāvara or Yāyāvarīya. In Bālarāmāyaṇa, he mentioned that his great grandfather Akalajalada belonged to Maharashtra. In the same work, he described his father Durduka as a Mahamantrin (minister) without providing any details. He mentioned in his works that his wife Avantisundari belonged to the Chahamana family. In his works, he described himself as the teacher of the Pratiharan emperor Mahendrapala I of Kannauj.

== Works ==
The works attributed to poet Rajshekhara include:

- Viddhaśālabhañjikā
- Bālabhārata
- Karpūramañjarī
- Bālarāmāyaṇa
- Kāvyamīmāṃsā

Rajashekhara wrote the Kāvyamīmāṃsā between 880 and 920 CE. The work is essentially a practical guide for poets that explains the elements and composition of a good poem. He is most noted for the Kārpūramañjarī, a play written in Maharashtri Prakrit. Rajashekhara wrote the play to please his wife, Avantisundarī, a woman of taste and accomplishment. Rajashekhara is perhaps the only ancient Indian poet to acknowledge his wife for her contributions to his literary career.

He wrote the Viddhashalabhanjika (IAST: Viddhaśālabhañjikā) under the patronage of the Kalachuri king Yuva-raja-deva I.
