= Sharngadhara-paddhati =

Anthology of Sanskrit-language short poems (subhashita) from India

Sharngadhara-paddhati (IAST: Śārṅgadharapaddhati, "Sharngadhara's Guidebook") is an anthology of Sanskrit-language short poems (subhashita) from India, compiled by Sharngadhara in 1363.

The text is notable for its account of Hatha Yoga, which it categorizes into two types: Gorakhnath's Hatha Yoga with six limbs and Markandeya's Hatha Yoga with eight limbs.

== Authorship and date ==
The Sharngadhara-paddhati (literally "Sharngadhara's Guidebook") was compiled by Sharngadhara in 1363. This Sharngadhara is believed to be the same individual mentioned in a prashasti (eulogistic inscription) as the son of Damodara and the grandson of Raghavadeva, who was the royal preceptor of Hammirabhupati of Shakambhari. Hammirabhupati can be identified with the Chahamana king Hammiradeva, a descendant of the Shakambhari Chahamanas. Hammiradeva, along with his preceptor Raghavadeva, lived in the late 13th century, so it is conceivable that Raghavadeva's grandson Sharngadhara was alive in 1363. Another text titled Sharngadhara-Samhita is attributed to Sharngadhara, but it is not clear if he was same as the author of Sharngadhara-paddhati: the author of Sharngadhara-Samhita does not provide any information about himself, except his name.

Sharngadhara, who was a poet himself, often states the names of the poets and works against the verses included in his anthology. However, he attributes some of the verses to "somebody". Some of the poets mentioned by Sharngadhara, such as Govinda-raja-deva, are otherwise unknown. Sharngadhara attributes several verses to more than one poets, and two verses to more than two poets. According to an analysis by H. D. Sharma (1937), the anthology mentions the names of 282 authors; another analysis by J. B. Chaudhuri (1941), counts 271 authors and 31 works.

== Contents ==
The Sharngadhara-paddhati is one of the best known collections of the subhashita-genre poems. It contains a description of Hatha Yoga. James Mallinson calls the text's analysis of yoga "somewhat confused", noting that it splits Hatha Yoga into two types, namely Gorakhnath's and Markandeya's, and then equates Hatha Yoga with Gorakhnath's six limbs of yoga, which are asana, pranayama, pratyahara, dharana, dhyana, and samadhi. The text then describes what these are with verses taken from the Dattātreyayogaśāstra, including five of its ten mudras. It then describes Markandeya's variety, adding yama and niyama to make up eight limbs of yoga.

== Editions ==
A verse in the Sharngadhara-paddhati states that the anthology includes 6300 verses. However, the now-extant part of the anthology contains only 4689 verses, divided into 163 sections (each called a paddhati).

The 18th century anthology Brihat-Sharngadhara-paddhati (IAST: Bṛhat-Śārṅgadhara-paddhati) is an extended version of Sharngadhara-paddhati. It contains 588 sections, out of which 473 sections have been borrowed from the Sharngadhara-paddhati. The anthology has 7586 verses (including 10 Prakrit verses); it excludes 66 verses from the now-extant portions of Sharngadhara-paddhati, and includes 2963 additional verses.

An edition of the text (The Paddhati Of Sarngadhara, Volume I), edited by Peter Peterson, was published in 1888. It is not a critical edition, although it is based on six different manuscripts. Peterson intended to publish a second volume with an introduction, various readings and notes, but this second volume was never published. German Indologist Theodor Aufrecht also edited 264 verses quoted in six other manuscripts, and authored a study titled Ueber die Paddhati von Çârñgadhara (1873).
