= List of Sanskrit plays in English translation =

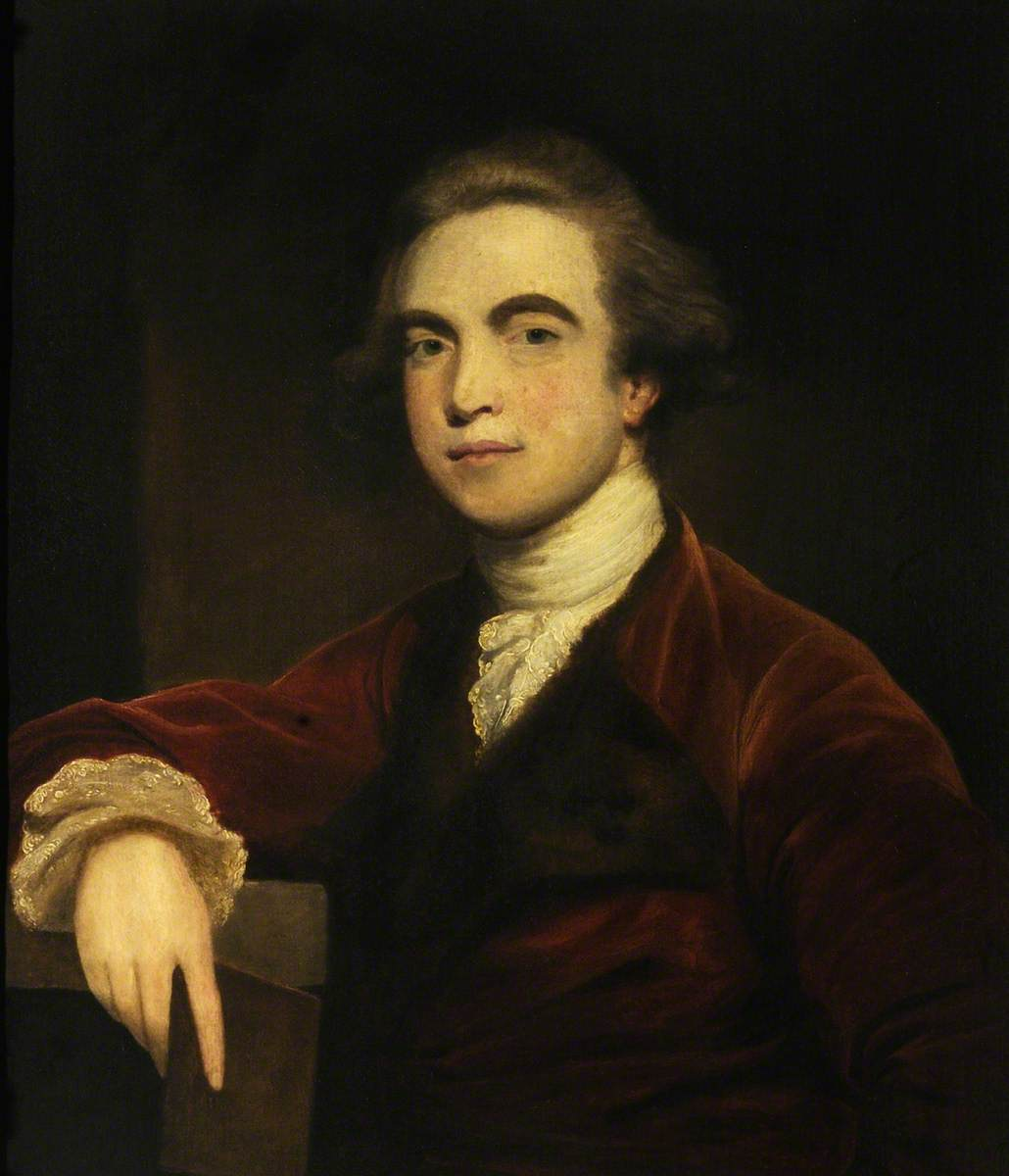
Sir William Jones

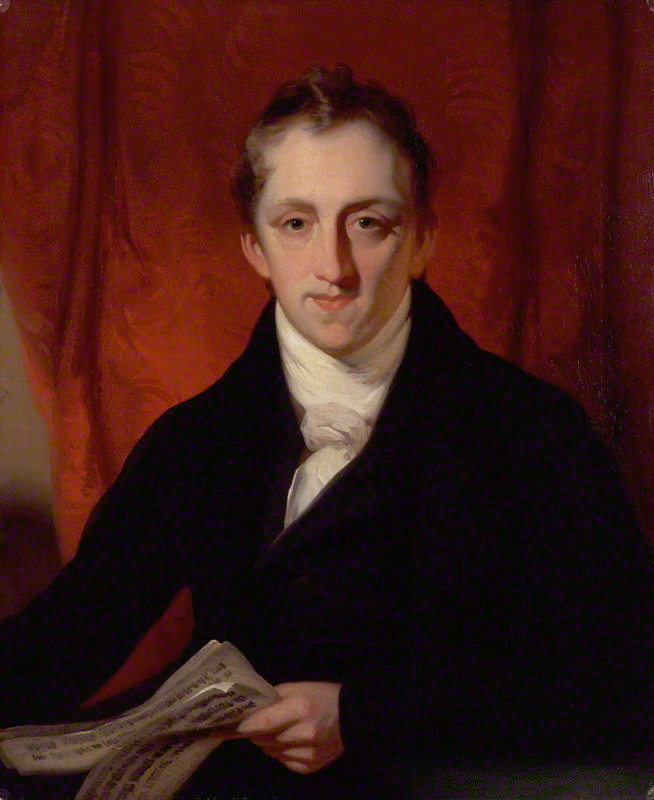
H. H. Wilson

Jones published the first English translation of any Sanskrit play (Śakuntalā) in 1789. In 1827, Wilson published the first major survey of Sanskrit drama in English.

Of around 155 extant Sanskrit plays, (Note: Schuyler listed 142 extant Sanskrit dramas; adding the 13 dramas discovered shortly thereafter and attributed to Bhāsa would bring the total to 155.) at least 46 distinct plays by at least 24 authors have been translated into English. William Jones published the first English translation of any Sanskrit play (Shakuntala) in 1789. About 3 decades later, H. H. Wilson published the first major English survey of Sanskrit drama, including 6 full translations (Mṛcchakatika, Vikramōrvaśīyam, Uttararamacarita, Malatimadhava, Mudrarakshasa, and Ratnavali). These 7 plays — plus Nagananda, Mālavikāgnimitram, and Svapnavasavadattam (the text of which was not discovered until almost a century after Wilson's volumes) — remain the most-translated plays.

The period of Sanskrit dramas in India begins roughly with the composition of the Natya Shastra (c. 200 BCE – 200 CE) — though this treatise evidences a mature theatrical practice already in existence. Literarily, the period dwindles around the composition of the Natya Shatra's influential abridgment: Dasharupakam (late 10th century CE) — though derivative works continued to be written. "Sanskrit drama" typically contains a mix of Sanskrit and Prakrit though, for example, Bhāsa's Dūtavākya contains no Prakrit, and Rajashekhara's Karpuramanjari is written entirely in Prakrit.

== List of translations ==
=== Key ===
- Published as — The titles of the English translations, with links to their full bibliographic entries.
- Year — The year of the translation's first publication. However, revised editions are frequently cited in the bibliography.

Fragmentary passages are not considered here, nor are modern dramas written in Sanskrit.

=== Table ===
Author	Sanskrit Title	Acts	Published as	Translator	Year
Kālidāsa	Abhijñāna Śākuntalam	7	Sacontalá; or, The Fatal Ring	William Jones	1789
Krsna Misra	Prabodhacandrodaya	6	The Moon of Intellect	J. Taylor	1812
Kālidāsa	Abhijñāna Śākuntalam	7	Abhijnana Sakuntalam	Nabin Chandra Vidyaratna	1822
Shudraka	Mṛcchakatika	10	The Toy Cart	H. H. Wilson	1827
Kālidāsa	Vikramōrvaśīyam	5	Vikrama and Urvasi	H. H. Wilson	1827
Bhavabhūti	Uttararamacarita	7	The Latter History of Rama	H. H. Wilson	1827
Bhavabhūti	Malatimadhava	10	Malati and Madhava	H. H. Wilson	1827
Vishakhadatta	Mudrarakshasa	7	The Signet of the Minister	H. H. Wilson	1827
Harsha	Ratnavali	4	The Necklace	H. H. Wilson	1827
Subhata	Mahanataka	9	The Dramatic History of King Rama	Maharaja Kalikrishna Bahadur	1840
Kālidāsa	Vikramōrvaśīyam	5	Vikramorvaśí	E. B. Cowell	1851
Kālidāsa	Abhijñāna Śākuntalam	7	Śakoontalá; or, The Lost Ring	Monier Monier-Williams	1855
Bhavabhūti	Mahaviracharita	7	Adventures of the Great Hero Rama	John Pickford	1871
Bhavabhūti	Uttararamacarita	7	Uttara Ráma Charita	Charles Henry Tawney	1871
Harsha	Nagananda	5	Joy of the Snake-world	Palmer Boyd	1872
Kālidāsa	Mālavikāgnimitram	5	Malavika and Agnimitra	Charles Henry Tawney	1875
Kālidāsa	Mālavikāgnimitram	5	Mālavikāgnimitra	Gopal Raghunatha Nandargikar	1879
Bhaṭṭa Nārāyaṇa	Veni Samhara	6	The Binding of the Braid	Sourindra Mohun Tagore	1880
Rajashekhara	Viddhasalabhanjika	4	Viddhasâlabhanjikâ	Kesava Ravaji Godabole	1886
Harsha	Nagananda	5	Nagananda	Anonymous	1887
Bhavabhūti	Uttararamacarita	7	Uttararama Charita	Krishna Kamal Bhattacharya	1891
Kālidāsa	Abhijñāna Śākuntalam	7	Shakuntala; or, The Recovered Ring	August Hjalmar Edgren	1894
Kālidāsa	Mālavikāgnimitram	5	Malavikagnimitra	S. Seshadri Ayyar	1896
Kālidāsa	Mālavikāgnimitram	5	Mâlavikâgnimitram	V. S. Apte	1897
Bāṇabhaṭṭa	Parvati Parinaya	5	Parvati Parinaya	G. R. Ratnam Aiyar	1898
Kālidāsa	Abhijñāna Śākuntalam	7	Abhijnānaśākuntalam	M. R. Kāle	1898
Kālidāsa	Vikramōrvaśīyam	5	The Vikramorvasiya	M. R. Kāle	1898
Kālidāsa	Vikramōrvaśīyam	5	Vikramorvasíyam	Kesava Balakrishna Paranjpe	1898
Vishakhadatta	Mudrarakshasa	7	The Signet Ring	K. H. Dhruva	1900
Vishakhadatta	Mudrarakshasa	7	Mudrarakshasa	M. R. Kāle	1900
Rajashekhara	Karpuramanjari	4	Karpūra-mañjarī	Charles Rockwell Lanman	1901
Harsha	Ratnavali	4	Ratnavali	Srīsachandra Chakravartī	1902
Harsha	Ratnavali	4	Ratnavali	Bidhubhusan Goswami?	1902
Kālidāsa	Abhijñāna Śākuntalam	7	Sakuntala	J. G. Jennings	1902
Kālidāsa	Abhijñāna Śākuntalam	7	The Abhijnânaŝakuntala	Paraṣurāma Nārāyana Patankar	1902
Kālidāsa	Abhijñāna Śākuntalam	7	Sakuntala	R. Vasudeva Row	1903
Harihara	Bhartrharinirveda	5	Bhartrharinirveda	Louis H. Gray	1904
Shudraka	Mṛcchakatika	10	The Little Clay Cart	Arthur W. Ryder	1905
Rajashekhara	Viddhasalabhanjika	4	Viddhaśālabhañjikā	Louis H. Gray	1906
Bhavabhūti	Malatimadhava	10	Mālatīmādhava	M. R. Kāle	1908
Harsha	Priyadarśikā	4	Priyadarsika	T. V. Srinivasachariar	1908
Kālidāsa	Abhijñāna Śākuntalam	7	Abhijnana Sakuntalam	S. Ray & K. Ray	1908
Bhaṭṭa Nārāyaṇa	Veni Samhara	6	Venị̂samhâra	M. R. Kāle	1910
Bhavabhūti	Uttararamacarita	7	Uttararamacharita	M. R. Kāle	1911
Harsha	Nagananda	5	Joy of the World of Serpents	B. Hale Worthham	1911
Kālidāsa	Vikramōrvaśīyam	5	Vikramorvasie	Aurobindo Ghosh	1911
Kālidāsa	Abhijñāna Śākuntalam	7	Shakuntala	Arthur W. Ryder	1912
Subhata	Dūtāṅgada	1	Dūtāṅgada	Louis H. Gray	1912
Kālidāsa	Vikramōrvaśīyam	5	Vikramorvaśî	Śrî Ānanda Āchārya	1914
Bhavabhūti	Uttararamacarita	7	Rama's Later History	Shripad Krishna Belvalkar	1915
Kālidāsa	Mālavikāgnimitram	5	Malavika	Arthur W. Ryder	1915
Kālidāsa	Abhijñāna Śākuntalam	7	Sakuntala and her Keepsake	Roby Datta	1915
Vishakhadatta	Mudrarakshasa	7	Mudrarakshasa	Shastri & Abhyanker	1916
Vedanta Desika	Sankalpa-suryodayam	10	The Dawn of the Divine Will	Narayanacharya & Iyengar	1917
Umāpati Upādhyāya	Parijataharana	1	Pārijāta-Harana	George Grierson	1917
Bhāsa	Svapnavasavadattam	6	The Dream Queen	Shirreff & Lall	1918
Vishakhadatta	Mudrarakshasa	7	Mudra-Rakshasam	S. Ray & K. Ray	1918
Harsha	Nagananda	5	Nagananda	M. R. Kāle	1919
Harsha	Nagananda	5	Nâgânanda	R. D. Karmarkar	1919
Harsha	Nagananda	5	Nāgānanda	Nerurkar & Joshi	1919
Harsha	Ratnavali	4	Ratnavali	S. Ray & K. Ray	1919
Vishakhadatta	Mudrarakshasa	7	Mudra-rakshasa	S. C. Chakravarti	1919
Bhāsa	Svapnavasavadattam	6	Svapnavasavadattam	Jain & Shastri	1920
Bhāsa	Pancaratram	3	Pancaratram	Waman Gopal Urdhwareshe	1920
Kālidāsa	Abhijñāna Śākuntalam	7	Sakuntala	Laurence Binyon	1920
Kālidāsa	Abhijñāna Śākuntalam	7	The Abhijñāna-Sākuntala	A. B. Gajendragadkar	1920
Kālidāsa	Vikramōrvaśīyam	5	Vikramorvaśîya	R. D. Karmarkar	1920
Bhāsa	Madhyamavyayoga	1	The Madhyama Vyayoga	Ernest Paxton Janvier	1921
Harsha	Ratnavali	4	Ratnavali	M. R. Kāle	1921
Bhaṭṭa Nārāyaṇa	Veni Samhara	6	Veṇīsaṃhāra	K. N. Dravid	1922
Bhaṭṭa Nārāyaṇa	Veni Samhara	6	Venisamhara	A. B. Gajendragadkar	1922
Bhāsa	Svapnavasavadattam	6	Vāsavadattā	V. S. Sukthankar	1923
Harsha	Priyadarśikā	4	Priyadarśikā	Nariman, Jackson & Ogden	1923
Bhāsa	Avimaraka	6	Avimaraka [part 1], [part 2], [part 3]	K. Rama Pisharoti	1924
Bhāsa	Duta-Ghatotkacam	1	Duta Ghatotkaca	K. Rama Pisharoti	1924
Bhavabhūti	Uttararamacarita	7	Uttaracharitam	S. Ray & K. Ray	1924
Shudraka	Mṛcchakatika	10	Mrichchhakatika	M. R. Kāle	1924
Umāpati Upādhyāya	Traivikramam	1	Traivikramam	K. Rama Pisharoti	1924
Bhāsa	Svapnavasavadattam	6	The Vision of Vāsadattā	Lakshman Sarup	1925
Bhāsa	Dutuvakyam	1	Envoy's Declaration	Dharmasila Jayaswal	1925
Harsha	Ratnavali	4	Ratnavali	C. R. Devadhar	1925
Vararuchi	Ubhayābhisārika	1	Ubhayabhisarika	Sukumar Sen	1926
Bhāsa	Pratima-natakam	7	Pratimā	C. R. Devadhar	1927
Bhāsa	Pratima-natakam	7	Pratima Nataka	Shivaram Mahadeo Pranjape	1927
Bhāsa	Pratima-natakam	7	Pratimā nātakam	Kangle & Trivedi	1927
Sakthibhadran	Āścaryacūḍāmaṇi	7	The Wonderful Crest-jewel	C. Sankarama Sastri	1927
Harsha	Priyadarśikā	4	Priyadarsika	M. R. Kāle	1928
Harsha	Priyadarśikā	4	Priyadarśikā	N.G. Suru	1928
Bhāsa	Svapnavasavadattam	6	Svapnavasavadatta	M. R. Kāle	1929
Bhavabhūti	Uttararamacarita	7	Uttaramcharitam	C. N. Joshi	1929
Kālidāsa	Vikramōrvaśīyam	5	Vikramorvasiya Nataka	Charu Deva Shastri	1929
Bhāsa	Abhisheka-natakam	6	Abhiṣekanāṭakaṃ	V. Venkatarama Shastri	1930
Bhāsa	Pratima-natakam	7	Pratimā	M. R. Kāle	1930
Kālidāsa	Mālavikāgnimitram	5	Mālavikāgnimitra	A. S. Krishna Rao	1930
Mahendravarman	Mattavilasa Prahasana	1	Matta-vilāsa	L. D. Barnett	1930
Bhāsa	Pratijnayaugandharayana	4	The Minister's Vows	Woolner & Sarup	1930
Bhāsa	Svapnavasavadattam	6	The Vision of Vasavadatta	Woolner & Sarup	1930
Bhāsa	Daridra-Carudattam	4	Carudatta in Poverty	Woolner & Sarup	1930
Bhāsa	Pancaratram	3	The Five Nights	Woolner & Sarup	1930
Bhāsa	Madhyamavyayoga	1	The Middle One	Woolner & Sarup	1930
Bhāsa	Pratima-natakam	7	The Statue Play	Woolner & Sarup	1930
Bhāsa	Dutuvakyam	1	The Embassy	Woolner & Sarup	1931
Bhāsa	Duta-Ghatotkacam	1	Potsherd as an Envoy	Woolner & Sarup	1931
Bhāsa	Karnabharam	1	Karna's Task	Woolner & Sarup	1931
Bhāsa	Urubhanga	1	The Broken Thighs	Woolner & Sarup	1931
Bhāsa	Avimaraka	6	Sheep-killer	Woolner & Sarup	1931
Bhāsa	Bala-caritam	5	The Adventures of the Boy Krishna	Woolner & Sarup	1931
Bhāsa	Abhisheka-natakam	6	The Consecration	Woolner & Sarup	1931
Kālidāsa	Abhijñāna Śākuntalam	7	Abhijñāna-śākuntalam	Ramendra Mohan Bose	1931
Harsha	Nagananda	5	Nāgānanda	Śaṅkararāma Śāstrī	1932
Diṇnāga	Kundamālā	6	Kundamālā	Bhanot & Vyas	1932
Kālidāsa	Mālavikāgnimitram	5	Malavikāgnimitram	M. R. Kāle	1933
Kālidāsa	Mālavikāgnimitram	5	Mālavikāgnimitra	R. D. Karmarakar	1933
Kālidāsa	Mālavikāgnimitram	5	Malvikagnimitra	Shastri & Shastri	1933
Harsha	Nagananda	5	Nâgânanda	P. V. Ramanujaswami	1934
Bhāsa	Abhisheka-natakam	6	Abhiśeka-Nāṭaka [part 1], [part 2]	K. Rama Pisharoti	1935
Bhavabhūti	Malatimadhava	10	Mālatīmādhava	R. D. Karmarkar	1935
Bhavabhūti	Malatimadhava	10	Mālatīmādhavam	Devadhar & Suru	1935
Harsha	Ratnavali	4	Ratnāvalī	Śaṅkararāma Śāstrī	1935
Diṇnāga	Kundamālā	6	The Jasmine Garland	A. C. Woolner	1935
Bhāsa	Svapnavasavadattam	6	Svapnavasuvadattam	S. K. Mitra	1936
Bhāsa	Svapnavasavadattam	6	Swapna-vasavadattam	Satyendra Nath Sen	1937
Bhāsa	Urubhanga	1	Ūrubhaṅgam	Kailash Nath Bhatnagar	1937
Shudraka	Mṛcchakatika	10	Mrcchakatika	R. D. Karmarakar	1937
Shudraka	Mṛcchakatika	10	The Toy-cart of Clay	Vasudeva Gopala Paranjpe	1937
Shudraka	Mṛcchakatika	10	The Little Clay Cart	Revilo P. Oliver	1938
Bhāsa	Pratijnayaugandharayana	4	Pratijñāyaugandharāyaṇam	C. R. Devadhar	1939
Bhāsa	Daridra-Carudattam	4	Charudattam	C. R. Devadhar	1939
Harsha	Ratnavali	4	Ratnavali	Bhattacharya & Das	1939
Shudraka	Mṛcchakatika	10	The Little Clay Cart	Satyendra Kumar Basu	1939
Bhāsa	Pratijnayaugandharayana	4	Yaugandharayana's Vows	S. N. Simha	1940
Bhāsa	Urubhanga	1	Breaking of Thighs	C. R. Devadhar	1940
Vishakhadatta	Mudrarakshasa	7	Mudrārāksasa	R. D. Karmarakar	1940
Bhāsa	Pratijnayaugandharayana	4	Yaugandharayana's Vows	A. S. P. Ayyar	1941
Bhāsa	Svapnavasavadattam	6	The Vision of Vasavadatta	A. S. P. Ayyar	1941
Bhāsa	Karnabharam	1	Karna's Burden	B. V. Hariyappa	1941
Bhāsa	Pratima-natakam	7	Pratima-Natakam	S. Ray & K. Ray	1942
Bhāsa	Pancaratram	3	The Five Nights	Anonymous	1943
Bhaṭṭa Nārāyaṇa	Veni Samhara	6	Venisamhara	R. S. Venkatarama Sastri	1943
Bhaṭṭa Nārāyaṇa	Veni Samhara	6	Veṇīsaṃhāram	Śaṅkararāma Śāstrī	1943
Bhāsa	Svapnavasavadattam	6	Svapnavāsavadattā	Gore & Mehendale	1944
Vishakhadatta	Mudrarakshasa	7	The Signet Ring	Ranjit Sitaram Pandit	1944
Kālidāsa	Abhijñāna Śākuntalam	7	Shakuntala; or, The Lost Token	Bela Bose	1945
Kālidāsa	Vikramōrvaśīyam	5	Vikrama and Urvasi	Bela Bose	1945
Kālidāsa	Mālavikāgnimitram	5	Malavika and Agnimitra	Bela Bose	1945
Bhāsa	Svapnavasavadattam	6	Svapnavāsavadattam	C. R. Devadhar	1946
Harsha	Nagananda	5	The Delight of Serpents	Bela Bose	1948
Harsha	Priyadarśikā	4	The Good-looking	Bela Bose	1948
Harsha	Ratnavali	4	A Necklace of Pearls	Bela Bose	1948
Harsha	Priyadarśikā	4	Priyadarsika	P. V. Ramanujaswami	1948
Kālidāsa	Vikramōrvaśīyam	5	The Vikramorvaśīyam	Athalye & Bhawe	1948
Vishakhadatta	Mudrarakshasa	7	Mudrārākṣasam	Devadhar & Bedekar	1948
Bhāsa	Svapnavasavadattam	6	Swapnavasavadattam	S. Ray & K. Ray	1949
Bhāsa	Pratima-natakam	7	The Statues Play	Anonymous	1950
Kālidāsa	Mālavikāgnimitram	5	Malavikagnimiytra	Gaidhani, Mangrulkar & Parikh	1950
Kālidāsa	Mālavikāgnimitram	5	Malavikagnimatra	Sane, Godbole & Uresekar	1950
Kālidāsa	Abhijñāna Śākuntalam	7	Abhijnana-Sakuntalam	Śatāvadhāna Śrīnivāsācārya	1950
Anonymous	Kaumudi-Mahotsava	5	Kaumudī Mahotsava	S. R. Shastri	1952
Bhaṭṭa Nārāyaṇa	Veni Samhara	6	Veṇīsaṃhāram	R. R. Deshpande	1953
Bhaṭṭa Nārāyaṇa	Veni Samhara	6	Veṇīsaṃhāram	G. V. Devasthali	1953
Harsha	Nagananda	5	Nāgānanda	M. A. Karandikar	1953
Harsha	Nagananda	5	Nāgānand	Toraskar & Deshpande	1953
Harsha	Ratnavali	4	Ratnavali	Joshi & Watwe	1953
Bhavabhūti	Uttararamacarita	7	Uttararāmacarita	R. D. Karmarkar	1954
Harsha	Ratnavali	4	Ratnavali	R. N. Gaidhani	1955
Shudraka	Padmaprabhritaka	1	Padmaprābhṛtakam	J. R. A. Loman	1956
Bhāsa	Karnabharam	1	Karṇabhāram	C. R. Devadhar	1957
Bhāsa	Madhyamavyayoga	1	Madhyamavyāyoga	C. R. Devadhar	1957
Bhāsa	Duta-Ghatotkacam	1	Dūtaghaṭotkacam	C. R. Devadhar	1957
Bhāsa	Dutuvakyam	1	Dūtavākyam	C. R. Devadhar	1957
Bhāsa	Pancaratram	3	Pañcharātram	C. R. Devadhar	1957
Kālidāsa	Abhijñāna Śākuntalam	7	Abhijñāna Śākuntalam	C. R. Devadhar	1958
Kālidāsa	Vikramōrvaśīyam	5	Vikramorvaśiyam	C. R. Devadhar	1958
Kālidāsa	Mālavikāgnimitram	5	Mālavikāgnimitram	C. R. Devadhar	1958
Kālidāsa	Abhijñāna Śākuntalam	7	Abhijn̄āna-Sakuntala	M. B. Emeneau	1962
Kālidāsa	Abhijñāna Śākuntalam	7	Shakuntala	P. Lal	1964
Shudraka	Mṛcchakatika	10	The Toy Cart	P. Lal	1964
Vishakhadatta	Mudrarakshasa	7	The Signet Ring of Rakshasa	P. Lal	1964
Bhāsa	Svapnavasavadattam	6	The Dream of Vasavadatta	P. Lal	1964
Bhavabhūti	Uttararamacarita	7	The Later Story of Rama	P. Lal	1964
Harsha	Ratnavali	4	Ratnavali	P. Lal	1964
Shudraka	Mṛcchakatika	10	The Little Clay Cart	J. A. B. van Buitenen	1968
Vishakhadatta	Mudrarakshasa	7	The Minister's Seal	J. A. B. van Buitenen	1968
Baudhāyana	Bhagavadajjukam	1	The Hermit and the Harlot	J. A. B. van Buitenen	1971
Śyāmilaka	Pādatāḍitaka	1	Pādatāḍitaka	Schokker & Worseley	1976
Kālidāsa	Abhijñāna Śākuntalam	7	Śakuntalā	Michael Coulson	1981
Vishakhadatta	Mudrarakshasa	7	Rākshasa's Ring	Michael Coulson	1981
Bhavabhūti	Malatimadhava	10	Mālati and Mādhava	Michael Coulson	1981
Kālidāsa	Abhijñāna Śākuntalam	7	Śakuntalā and the Ring of Recollection	Barbara Stoler Miller	1984
Kālidāsa	Vikramōrvaśīyam	5	Urvasī Won By Valor	David Gitomer	1984
Kālidāsa	Mālavikāgnimitram	5	Mālavikā and Agnimitra	Edwin Gerow	1984
Bhāsa	Madhyamavyayoga	1	The Middle One	A. N. D. Haksar	1993
Bhāsa	Pancaratram	3	Five Nights	A. N. D. Haksar	1993
Bhāsa	Dutuvakyam	1	The Envoy	A. N. D. Haksar	1993
Bhāsa	Duta-Ghatotkacam	1	The Message	A. N. D. Haksar	1993
Bhāsa	Karnabharam	1	Karna's Burden	A. N. D. Haksar	1993
Bhāsa	Urubhanga	1	The Shattered Thigh	A. N. D. Haksar	1993
Kālidāsa	Mālavikāgnimitram	5	Mâlavikâgnimitram	Chandra Rajan	2002
Kālidāsa	Vikramōrvaśīyam	5	Vikramorvasíyam	Chandra Rajan	2002
Kālidāsa	Abhijñāna Śākuntalam	7	The Recognition of Śakuntalā	Chandra Rajan	2002
Jayanta Bhatta	Āgamaḍambara	4	Much Ado About Religion	Csaba Dezső	2005
Vishakhadatta	Mudrarakshasa	7	Rākṣasa's Ring	Michael Coulson	2005
Harsha	Ratnavali	4	The Lady of the Jewel Necklace	Wendy Doniger	2006
Harsha	Priyadarśikā	4	The Lady who Shows her Love	Wendy Doniger	2006
Kālidāsa	Abhijñāna Śākuntalam	7	The Recognition of Shakúntala	Somadeva Vasudeva	2006
Murāri	Anargharāghava	?	Rāma Beyond Price	Judit Törzsök	2006
Bhavabhūti	Uttararamacarita	7	Rama's Last Act	Sheldon I. Pollock	2007
Kālidāsa	Abhijñāna Śākuntalam	7	The Recognition of Śakuntalā	W. J. Johnson	2008
Harsha	Nagananda	5	How the Nāgas were Pleased	Andrew Skilton	2009
Bhāsa	Urubhanga	1	The Shattered Thighs	Andrew Skilton	2009
Kālidāsa	Mālavikāgnimitram	5	Mālavikā and Agnimitra	Balogh & Somogyi	2009
Kālidāsa	Vikramōrvaśīyam	5	How Úrvashi was Won	Rao & Shulman	2009
Shudraka	Mṛcchakatika	10	The Little Clay Cart	Diwakar Acharya	2009
Krsna Misra	Prabodhacandrodaya	6	The Rise of Wisdom Moon	Matthew Kapstein	2009
Śyāmilaka	Pādatāḍitaka	1	The Kick	Dezső & Vasudeva	2009
Vararuchi	Ubhayābhisārika	1	The Mutual Elopement	Dezső & Vasudeva	2009
Shudraka	Padmaprabhritaka	1	The Lotus Gift	Dezső & Vasudeva	2009
Īśvaradatta	Dhūrtavitasaṃvāda	1	Rogue and Pimp Confer	Dezső & Vasudeva	2009
Shudraka	Mṛcchakatika	10	The Clay Toy-Cart	Padmini Rajappa	2018
Kālidāsa	Vikramōrvaśīyam	5	Quest for Urvashi	A. N. D. Haksar	2021

== Bibliography ==
=== Translations ===
==== Anonymous ====
- Anonymous (1952). Kaumudī Mahotsava. Translated by Shastri, Sakuntala Rao. Bombay.

==== Bāṇabhaṭṭa ====
- Bāṇabhaṭṭa (1898). The Parvati Parinaya of Banabhatta. Translated by Aiyar, G. R. Ratnam. Madras: L.V. Ramachandra Iyer. OCLC 663420957.

==== Baudhāyana ====
- Baudhāyana (1971). "The Hermit and the Harlot". Mahfil. 7 (3/4). Translated by Buitenen, J. A. B. van: 149–166. ISSN 0025-0503. JSTOR 40874441.

==== Bhāsa ====
- Bhāsa (1918). The Dream Queen: A Translation of the Svapnavasavadatta of Bhasa. Translated by Shirreff, A. G.; Lall, Panna. Allahabad: Indian Press.
- Bhāsa (1920a). Svapnavasavadattam. Translated by Jain, Banarsi Das; Shastri, Madan Gopal. Lahore: P. Charan Das. OCLC 557433768.
- Bhāsa (1920b). Pancaratram. Translated by Urdhwareshe, Waman Gopal. Indore: Holkar State Printing Press. OCLC 878273052.
- Bhāsa (1921). The Madhyama Vyayoga: a drama composed by the poet Bhasa. Translated by Janvier, Ernest Paxton. Mysore: Wesleyan Mission Press.
- Bhāsa (1923). Vāsavadattā: Being a Translation of an Anonymous Sanskrit Drama, Svapanavāsavadatta, Attributed to Bhāsa. Translated by Sukthankar, V. S. London: Oxford University Press.
- Bhāsa (1924a). "Avimaraka [Act I?]". Shama'a. IV. Translated by Pisharoti, K. Rama: 285–295.
- Bhāsa (1924b). "Duta Ghatotkaca". Shama'a. IV. Translated by Pisharoti, K. Rama: 129–151.
- Bhāsa (1925a). "Avimaraka [Acts II-V?]". Shama'a. V. Translated by Pisharoti, K. Rama: 47–59, 114–126, 270–284.
- Bhāsa (1925b). The Vision of Vāsadattā (Svapnavāsavadattam) &c. Translated by Sarup, Lakshman. Lahore: Das Bros. OCLC 936468387.
- Bhāsa (1925c). "Duta-Vakyam; or Envoy's Declaration". The Modern Review. 38 (6 (December)). Translated by Jayaswal, Dharmasila: 665–669. ISSN 0026-8380.
- Bhāsa (1926). "Avimaraka [Act VI]". Shama'a. VI (4 (July)). Translated by Pisharoti, K. Rama: 213–225.
- Bhāsa (1927a). Pratima Nataka. Translated by Pranjape, Shivaram Mahadeo. Pune: Oriental Book Agency.
- Bhāsa (1927b). Pratimā nātakam of Bhāsa. Translated by Kangle, R. P.; Trivedi, F. C. Ahmedabad: Vasanta Press. OCLC 1222778541.
- Bhāsa (1929). Svapnavasavadatta. Translated by Kāle, M(oreshvar) R(amchandra) (3rd ed.). Bombay: Booksellers Publishing Co. OCLC 977771182.
- Bhāsa (1930a). Thirteen Trivandrum Plays Attributed To Bhasa. Vol. I. Translated by Woolner, A. C.; Sarup, Lakshman. London: Oxford University Press.
- Bhāsa (1930b) [1927]. Pratimā. Translated by Devadhar, C[hintamani] R[amachandra] (2nd revised and enlarged ed.). Pune: N. Bhide & Co. OCLC 557433755.
- Bhāsa (1930c). Pratimā. Translated by Kāle, M(oreshvar) R(amchandra). Bombay: Gopal Narayen & Co. OCLC 557433764.
- Bhāsa (1930d). Abhiṣekanāṭakaṃ; a Sanskrit drama in seven acts. Translated by Shastri, V. Venkatarama. Lahore: Punjab Sanskrit Book Depot. OCLC 48255755.
- Bhāsa (1931). Thirteen Trivandrum Plays Attributed To Bhasa. Vol. II. Translated by Woolner, A. C.; Sarup, Lakshman. London: Oxford University Press.
- Bhāsa (1935a). "Abhiśeka-Nāṭaka". Journal of the Annamalai University. IV. Translated by Pisharoti, K. Rama: 131–148, 275–286.
- Bhāsa (1935b). "Abhiśeka-Nāṭaka". Journal of the Annamalai University. V. Translated by Pisharoti, K. Rama: 119–134, 243–253.
- Bhāsa (1936). Svapnavasuvadattam. Translated by Mitra, S. K. Bangla. OCLC 229482733.
- Bhāsa (1937). Bhāsa's Ūrubhaṅgam. Translated by Bhatnagar, Kailash Nath. Lahore: M. L. Banarsi Das. OCLC 586808764.
- Bhāsa (1939). Pratijñāyaugandharāyaṇam: a Sanskrit drama in four acts. Poona Oriental Series. Vol. 61. Translated by Devadhar, C[hintamani] R[amachandra]. Pune: Oriental Book Agency. OCLC 36274668.
- Bhāsa (1940a). Ūrubhaṅgam (Breaking of Thighs): a Sanskrit one-act play. Poona Oriental Series. Vol. 72. Translated by Devadhar, C[hintamani] R[amachandra]. Pune: Oriental Book Agency. OCLC 214677185.
- Bhāsa (1940b). Yaugandharayana's Vows (a play in four acts). Translated by Simha, S. N. Bangalore City: Sanskrit Literature Society. OCLC 69395822.
- Bhāsa (1941a). Two Plays Of Bhasa. Translated by Ayyar, A. S. P. Madras: Madras Law Journal Office.
- Bhāsa (1941b). "Karna's Burden". In Narayanaswamy Naidu, B. V. (ed.). Rajah Sir Annamalai Chettiar Commemoration Volume. Translated by Hariyappa, H. L. Madras: Annamalai University. pp. 210–225.
- Bhāsa (1942). Bhasa's Pratima-Natakam. Translated by Ray, Saradaranjan; Ray, Kumudranjan. Calcutta: Nalanda Press.
- Bhāsa (1943a) [1939]. Charudattam. Poona Oriental Series. Vol. 65. Translated by Devadhar, C[hintamani] R[amachandra] (2nd revised ed.). Pune: Oriental Book Agency.
- Bhāsa (1943b). Pancharatram: The Five Nights [a play in three acts]. Translated by Anonymous. Bangalore City: Sanskrit Literature Society. OCLC 1080737270.
- Bhāsa (1944). The Svapnavāsavadattā of Bhāsa. Translated by Gore, N. A.; Mehendale, M. A. Baroda: Good Companions. OCLC 17130649.
- Bhāsa (1946) [1925?]. Svapnavāsavadattam: a Sanskrit drama in six acts. Poona Oriental Series. Vol. 27. Translated by Devadhar, C[hintamani] R[amachandra] (4th ed.). Pune: Oriental Book Agency. OCLC 28794638.
- Bhāsa (1950). Bhasa's Pratima-Nataka: The Statues Play. Bangalore City: Samskrita Sahitya Sadana. OCLC 40886055.
- Bhāsa (1955) [1937]. Bhasa's Swapna-vasavadattam. Translated by Sen, Satyendra Nath (4th ed.). Calcutta: Chattopadhyaya Brothers.
- Bhāsa (1957a). Pañcharātram. Translated by Devadhar, C. R. Pune: Oriental Book Agency.
- Bhāsa (1957b). Madhyamavyāyoga. Translated by Devadhar, C. R. Pune: Oriental Book Agency. OCLC 18722806.
- Bhāsa (1957c). Dūtavākyam. Translated by Devadhar, C. R. Pune: Oriental Book Agency. OCLC 917020286.
- Bhāsa (1957d). Karṇabhāram. Translated by Devadhar, C. R. Pune: Oriental Book Agency. OCLC 19356833.
- Bhāsa (1957e). Dūtaghaṭotkacam. Translated by Devadhar, C. R. Pune: Oriental Book Agency. OCLC 69188867.
- Bhāsa (1961) [1949]. Bhasa's Swapnavasavadattam. Translated by Ray, Saradaranjan; Ray, Kumudranjan (3rd revised ed.). Calcutta: K. Ray. OCLC 964321526.
- Bhāsa (1993). The Shattered Thigh and the Other Mahābhārata Plays of Bhasa. Translated by Haksar, A. N. D. New Delhi: Penguin Books India. ISBN 9780140178371.

==== Bhaṭṭa Nārāyaṇa ====
- Bhaṭṭa Nārāyaṇa (1880). Veṉí-sanhára Nátaka; or, The Binding of the Braid. Translated by Tagore, Sourindra Mohun. Calcutta: The Translator.
- Bhaṭṭa Nārāyaṇa (1910). The Venị̂samhâra of Bhaṭṭa Nârâyana. Translated by Kāle, M(oreshvar) R(amchandra). Bombay: Oriental Publishing Company.
- Bhaṭṭa Nārāyaṇa (1922). Veṇīsaṃhāra: A Sanskrit Drama in Six Acts. Translated by Dravid, K. N. Pune: Oriental Book-supplying Agency.
- Bhaṭṭa Nārāyaṇa (1933) [1922]. The Venisamhara of Bhatta Narayana. Translated by Gajendragadkar, A. B. (2nd revised ed.). Bombay: Aryabhushan Press.
- Bhaṭṭa Nārāyaṇa (1943a). The Venisamhara of Bhatta Narayana. Translated by Sastri, R. S. Venkatarama. Madras: Malati Trades. OCLC 428363841.
- Bhaṭṭa Nārāyaṇa (1943b). Veṇīsaṃhāram. Translated by Śāstrī, Śaṅkararāma (2nd ed.). Madras. OCLC 26620910.
- Bhaṭṭa Nārāyaṇa (1953a). Veṇīsaṃhāram. Translated by Deshpande, R. R. Bombay: Dadar Book Depot. OCLC 1016209057.
- Bhaṭṭa Nārāyaṇa (1953b). Bhaṭṭa Nārāyaṇa's Veṇīsaṃhāram. Translated by Devasthali, Govind Vinayak. Bombay: Book-sellers Publishing Co. OCLC 793351570.

==== Bhavabhūti ====
- Bhavabhūti (1871). Maha-vira-charita: The Adventures of the Great Hero Rama. Translated by Pickford, John. London: Trübner.
- Bhavabhūti (1874) [1871]. Uttara Ráma Charita: A Sanskrit Drama. Translated by Tawney, C. H. (Second ed.). Calcutta: Thacker, Spink.
- Bhavabhūti (1891). An English Translation of Uttararama Charita. Translated by Bhattacharya, Krishna Kamal. Calcutta: Kedar Nath Bose. OCLC 4538216.
- Bhavabhūti (1911). Uttararamacharita. Translated by Kāle, M(oreshvar) R(amchandra). Bombay: Gopal Narayan & Co.
- Bhavabhūti (1915). Rama's Later History; or, Uttara-Drama Charita; An Ancient Hindu Drama. Harvard Oriental Series. Vol. 21. Translated by Belvalkar, Shripad Krishna. Cambridge, MA: Harvard University Press.
- Bhavabhūti (1935). Mālatīmādhavam. Translated by Devadhar, C[hintamani] R[amachandra]; Suru, N.G. Pune: C.R. Devadhar and N.G. Suru. OCLC 21790895.
- Bhavabhūti (1954). Uttararāmacarita of Bhavabhūti. Translated by Karmarkar, R. D. Pune: K.G. Sharangpani. OCLC 976504997.
- Bhavabhūti (1962) [1929]. Kane, P. V. (ed.). Uttaramcharitam Of Bhavabhuti. Translated by Joshi, C. N. (4th revised ed.). Delhi: Motilal Banarsidass.
- Bhavabhūti (1966) [1924]. Bhavabhuti's Uttaracharitam. Translated by Ray, Saradaranjan; Ray, Kumudranjan (7th revised and enlarged ed.). Calcutta: S. Ray. OCLC 213442.
- Bhavabhūti (1967) [1908]. Bhavabhūti's Mālatīmādhava. Translated by Kāle, M(oreshvar) R(amchandra) (3rd ed.). Delhi: Motilal Banarsidass. OCLC 60189807.
- Bhavabhūti (2003) [1935]. Mālatīmādhava of Bhavabhūti. Translated by Karmarkar, R. D. (Reprint ed.). Delhi: Chaukhamba Sanskrit Pratishthan. ISBN 9788170841807. OCLC 55108066.
- Bhavabhūti (2007). Rama's Last Act. Translated by Pollock, Sheldon I. New York: New York University Press. ISBN 978-0-8147-6733-7.

==== Diṇnāga ====
- Diṇnāga (1935). The Jasmine Garland. Translated by Woolner, A. C. London: Oxford University Press.
- Diṇnāga (1937) [1932]. Shastri, Jagdish (ed.). Kundamālā Of Diṇnāga. Translated by Bhanot, Saran Dass; Vyas, Ved (2nd revised and enlarged ed.). Lahore: Oriental Booksellers.

==== Harihara ====
- Harihara (1904). "The Bhartrharinirveda of Harihara, Now First Translated from the Sanskrit and Prākrit". Journal of the American Oriental Society. 25. Translated by Gray, Louis H.: 197–230. doi:10.2307/592562. JSTOR 592562.

==== Harsha ====
- Harsha (1872). Nágánanda; or The Joy of the Snake-world. Translated by Boyd, Palmer. London: Trübner.
- Harsha (1887). Nagananda. Translated by Anonymous. Calcutta: Nundo Lall Chatterjee. OCLC 771415301.
- Harsha (1902a). The Ratnavali of Sriharsha Deva. Translated by Goswami?, Bidhubhusan. Calcutta: Kedarnath Bose. OCLC 43285209.
- Harsha (1902b). The Ratnavali: A Sanskrit Drama. Translated by Chakravartī, Srīsachandra. Dhaka: Hari Ram Dhar.
- Harsha (1908). Priyadarsika. Translated by Srinivasachariar, T. V. Madras: Oriental Press.
- Harsha; Somadeva (1911). The Buddhist Legend of Jîmûtavâhana [...] dramatized in the Nâgânanda (the Joy of the World of Serpents). Translated by Wortham, B. Hale. London: Routledge.
- Harsha (1919a). The Nagananda. Translated by Kāle, M(oreshvar) R(amchandra). Bombay: Standard Publishing Co.
- Harsha (1919b). Nāgānanda of Shri Harsha. Translated by Nerurkar, V. R.; Joshi, G. M. Bombay: Keshav Bhikaji Dhavale. OCLC 80577242.
- Harsha (1919c). Nâgânanda. Translated by Karmarkar, Raghunath D. Pune: Chitra Shala Press. OCLC 82851340.
- Harsha (1921). The Ratnavali. Translated by Kāle, M(oreshvar) R(amchandra). Bombay: Standard Publishing Co.
- Harsha (1922) [1919]. Sriharsha's Ratnavali. Translated by Ray, Saradaranjan; Ray, Kumudranjan. Calcutta: Manoranjan Ray. OCLC 250016740.
- Harsha (1923). Priyadarśikā: a Sanskrit Drama. Indo-Iranian Series. Vol. 10. Translated by Nariman, G. K.; Jackson, A. V. Williams; Ogden, Charles J. New York: Columbia University Press.
- Harsha (1928a). The Priyadarsika. Translated by Kāle, M(oreshvar) R(amchandra). Bombay: Gopal Narayan and Co.
- Harsha (1928b). Priyadarśikā. Translated by Suru, N.G. Pune: N.G. Suru. OCLC 663318397.
- Harsha (1935). Ratnāvalī: A Sanskrit Play by Śrī Harṣa Deva. Translated by Śāstrī, Śaṅkararāma. Madras: Sri Balamanorama Press. OCLC 249013628.
- Harsha (1939). Ratnavali of Emperor Shri Harsha. Translated by Bhattacharya, Ashokanath; Das, Maheshwar. Calcutta: Modern Book Agency.
- Harsha (1947) [1932]. Nāgānanda of Harṣa Deva. Translated by Sastri, C. Sankarama. Mylapore: Sri Balamanorama. OCLC 41293314.
- Harsha (1948a). Priyadarsika. Translated by Ramanujaswami, P(aravastu) V(enkata). Madras: Ramaswamy Sastrul. OCLC 1016423874.
- Harsha (1948b). The Dramas of Shrí Harsha. Translated by Bose, Bela. Allahabad: Ketabistan. OCLC 458650526.
- Harsha (1950) [1934]. Sri Harsha's Nâgânanda. Translated by Ramanujaswami, P. V. Madras: Sastrulu. OCLC 642973977.
- Harsha (1953a). Ratnavali: A Sanskrit Drama. Translated by Joshi, V. K.; Watwe, G. M. Belgaum: Vasant Vihar. OCLC 1016423756.
- Harsha (1953b). The Nāgānanda Of Srīharṣa. Translated by Karandikar, M. A.; Karandikar, S. Bombay: New and Second Hand Book Stall.
- Harsha (1953c). Nāgānand of Harshadev. Translated by Toraskar, Asha V.; Deshpande, N. A. Bombay: Bookseller's Publishing Co. OCLC 642986145.
- Harsha (1954) [1925]. Ratnavali of Sri Harsa. Translated by Devadhar, C(hintaman) R(amachandra); Suru, N. G. Pune: Poona Oriental Book House. OCLC 45694377.
- Harsha (1955). The Ratnavali of Sri Harsa-Deva. Translated by Gaidhani, R. N. Pune: A.A. Kulkarni. OCLC 613005226.
- Harsha (2006). The Lady of the Jewel Necklace; and, The Lady who Shows her Love. Translated by Doniger, Wendy. New York: New York University Press. ISBN 978-0-8147-1996-1.

==== Jayanta Bhatta ====
- Jayanta Bhatta (2005). Much Ado About Religion. Translated by Dezső, Csaba. New York: New York University Press. ISBN 978-0-8147-1979-4.

==== Kālidāsa ====
- Kālidāsa (1792) [1790]. Sacontalá; or, The Fatal Ring. Translated by Jones, William. London: Edwards.
- Kālidāsa (1822). Kalidasa's Abhijnana Sakuntalam. Translated by Vidyaratna, Nabin Chandra. Calcutta: S. C. Bhattacharjya.
- Kālidāsa (1851). Vikramorvaśí. Translated by Cowell, Edward Byles. Hertford: Stephen Austin.
- Kālidāsa (1855). Śakoontalá; or, The Lost Ring: An Indian Drama. Translated by Williams, Monier. Hertford: Stephen Austin.
- Kālidāsa (1879). Mālavikāgnimitra, a Sanskrit Drama. Translated by Nandargikar, Gopal Raghunatha. Pune: Shivaji Press. OCLC 48270466.
- Kālidāsa (1891) [1875]. The Malavikágnimitra. Translated by Tawney, C. H. (Second ed.). Calcutta: Thacker, Spink.
- Kālidāsa (1894). Shakuntala; or, The Recovered Ring; a Hindoo Drama. Translated by Edgren, A Hjalmar. New York: Henry Holt.
- Kālidāsa (1896). The Malavikagnimitra Of Kalidasa. Translated by Ayyar, S. Seshadri. Pune: Dyan Prakash Press.
- Kālidāsa (1897). The Mâlavikâgnimitram. Translated by Apte, V. S. Pune: Vrttaprasaraka Press. OCLC 560413242.
- Kālidāsa (1898). Vikramorvasíyam. Translated by Paranjpe, Kesava Balakrishna. Bombay: Native Opinion Press. OCLC 560418375.
- Kālidāsa (1902a). Sakuntala: A Play in Five Acts. Translated by Jennings, J. G. Allahabad: Indian Press.
- Kālidāsa (1902b). The Abhijnânaŝakuntala, the Purer Devanagari Text. Translated by Patankar, Paraṣurāma Nārāyana. Pune: Shiralkar.
- Kālidāsa (1903). Sakuntala. Translated by Row, R. Vasudeva. Madras. OCLC 43321460.
- Kālidāsa (1911). Vikramorvasie; or, The Hero and the Nymph. Translated by Ghosh, Aurobindo. Calcutta: R. Chatterjee. OCLC 560418487.
- Kālidāsa (1912). Translations of Shakuntala and Other Works. Translated by Ryder, Arthur W. London: J. M. Dent & Sons.
- Kālidāsa (1914). Vikramorvaśî: an Indian drama. Translated by Āchārya, Śrî Ānanda. London: Francis Griffiths. OCLC 560418513.
- Kālidāsa (1915a) [1898]. The Vikramorvasiya. Translated by Kāle, M(oreshvar) R(amchandra) (5th revised ed.). Bombay: The Oriental Publishing Company.
- Kālidāsa (1915b). Malavika: A Five-Act Comedy of Kalidasa. Translated by Ryder, Arthur W. Berkeley: California University Press.
- Kālidāsa (1915c). Sakuntala and her Keepsake. Translated by Datta, Roby. Calcutta: Das Gupta.
- Kālidāsa (1920a). Sakuntala. Translated by Binyon, Laurence; Das Gupta, Kedar Nath. London: Macmillan.
- Kālidāsa (1920b). Vikramorvaśîya. Translated by Karmarkar, R. D. Pune: Chitra Shala Press. OCLC 49487553.
- Kālidāsa (1920c). The Abhijñāna-Sākuntala. Translated by Gajendragadkar, A. B. Bombay: Standard Pub. Co. OCLC 24693500.
- Kālidāsa (1929). Vikramorvasiya Nataka. Translated by Shastri, Charu Deva. Lahore: Shamsher Singh.
- Kālidāsa (1930). The Mālavikāgnimitra of Kālidāsa. Translated by Krishna Rao, A. S. Madras: Vavilla Ramaswamy Sastrulu & Sons. OCLC 560413296.
- Kālidāsa (1933a). The Malvikagnimitra of Kalidasa. Translated by Shastri, Charu Deva; Shastri, B. B. Lahore: Shamsher Singh. OCLC 560413314.
- Kālidāsa (1933b). Mālavikāgnimitra of Kālidāsa. Translated by Karamarakara, Raghunātha Dāmodara (2nd ed.). Pune. OCLC 65897187.
- Kālidāsa (1945). The Dramas Of Kalidasa. Translated by Bose, Bela. Allahabad: Kitabistan.
- Kālidāsa (1946) [1908]. Abhijnana Sakuntalam. Translated by Ray, Saradaranjan; Ray, Kumudranjan (13th, revised and enlarged ed.). Calcutta: Nalanda Press.
- Kālidāsa (1948). The Vikramorvaśīyam. Translated by Athalye, S.B.; Bhawe, S.S. (2nd ed.). Bombay: Dhawale. OCLC 238833769.
- Kālidāsa (1950a). The Malavikagnimatra of Kalidasa. Translated by Sane, P. S.; Godbole, G. H.; Uresekar, H. S. Bombay: Book Seller's Publishing. OCLC 851208934.
- Kālidāsa (1950b). The Malavikagnimiytra. Translated by Gaidhani, R. N.; Mangrulkar, A. G.; Parikh, J. T. Surat: Popular Book Store. OCLC 416476160.
- Kālidāsa (1950c). Abhijnana-Sakuntalam. Translated by Śrīnivāsācārya, Śatāvadhāna. Madras: Vavilla Ramaswamy Sastrulu & Sons. OCLC 28203952.
- Kālidāsa (1950d) [1931]. Kalidasa: Abhijñāna-śākuntalam: A Synthetic Study. Translated by Bose, Ramendra Mohan (6th ed.). Calcutta: Modern Book Agency.
- Kālidāsa (1958). Works Of Kalidasa Vol. 1: Dramas. Translated by Devadhar, C. R. Delhi: Motilal Banardisass.
- Kālidāsa (1960) [1933]. The Malavikāgnimitram of Kālidāsa. Translated by Kāle, M(oreshvar) R(amchandra) (Revised and enlarged ed.). Bombay: A.R. Sheth. OCLC 18722865.
- Kālidāsa (1962). Abhijn̄āna-Sakuntala. Translated by Emeneau, M. B. Berkeley: University of California Press. OCLC 1068722.
- Kālidāsa (1969) [1898]. Abhijnānaśākuntalam. Translated by Kāle, M(oreshvar) R(amchandra) (10th ed.). Delhi: Motilal Banarsidass.
- Kālidāsa (1984). Miller, Barbara Stoler (ed.). Theater of Memory: the plays of Kālidāsa. New York: Columbia University Press. ISBN 978-0231058384.
- Kālidāsa (2002). The Complete Works of Kālidāsa. Vol. 2: Plays. Translated by Rajan, Chandra. New Delhi: Sahitya Akademi. ISBN 978-8126014842. OCLC 314250390.
- Kālidāsa (2006a). The Loom of Time: A selection of his plays and poems. Translated by Rajan, Chandra. London: Penguin Books. ISBN 978-0140455212.
- Kālidāsa (2006b). The Recognition of Shakúntala. Translated by Vasudeva, Somadeva. New York: New York University Press. ISBN 978-0-8147-8815-8.
- Kālidāsa (2008). The Recognition of Śakuntalā: a play in seven acts. Translated by Johnson, W. J. Oxford: Oxford University Press. ISBN 978-0199540600.
- Kālidāsa (2009a). How Úrvashi was Won. Translated by Rao, Velcheru Narayana; Shulman, David. New York: New York University Press. ISBN 978-0-8147-4111-5.
- Kālidāsa (2009b). Mālavikā and Agnimitra. Translated by Balogh, Dániel; Somogyi, Eszter. New York: New York University Press. ISBN 978-0-8147-8702-1.
- Kālidāsa (2021). Vikramorvashiyam: Quest for Urvashi. Translated by Haksar, A. N. D. Haryana: India Penguin Classics. ISBN 978-0670093632.

==== Krsna Misra ====
- Krsna Misra (1812). Prabod'h Chandro'daya; or The Moon of Intellect; an allegorical drama; and Atma Bod'h, or the Knowledge of Spirit. Translated by Taylor, J. London: Longman.
- Krsna Misra (2009). The Rise of Wisdom Moon. Translated by Kapstein, Matthew. New York: New York University Press. ISBN 978-0-8147-4838-1.

==== Mahendravarman ====
- Mahendravarman (1930). "Matta-vilāsa: A Farce". Bulletin of the School of Oriental Studies, University of London. 5 (4). Translated by Barnett, L. D.: 697–717. ISSN 1356-1898. JSTOR 607015.

==== Murāri ====
- Murāri (2006). Rāma Beyond Price. Translated by Törzsök, Judit. New York: New York University Press. ISBN 978-0814782958.

==== Rajashekhara ====
- Rajashekhara (1886). The Viddhasâlabhanjikâ. Translated by Godabole, Kesava Ravaji. Pune: Arya Bhusana Press. OCLC 903076118.
- Rajashekhara (1901). Konow, Sten (ed.). Rāja-çekhara's Karpūra-mañjarī. Harvard Oriental Series. Vol. IV. Translated by Lanman, Charles Rockwell. Cambridge, MA: Harvard University.
- Rajashekhara (1906). "The Viddhaśālabhañjikā of Rājaśekhara". Journal of the American Oriental Society. 27. Translated by Gray, Louis H.: 1–71. doi:10.2307/592847. JSTOR 592847.

==== Sakthibhadran ====
- Sakthibhadran (1927). The Wonderful Crest-jewel. Translated by Sastri, C. Sankarama. Madras: Sri Balamanorama Press. OCLC 5717201.

==== Subhata ====
- Subhata (1840). A Dramatic History Of King Rama. Translated by Bahadur, Maharaja Kalikrishna. Calcutta: Columbian Press.
- Subhata (1912). "The Dūtāṅgada of Subhaṭa, Now First Translated from the Sanskrit and Prākrit". Journal of the American Oriental Society. 32 (1). Translated by Gray, Louis H.: 58–77. doi:10.2307/3087587. ISSN 0003-0279. JSTOR 3087587.

==== Shudraka ====
- Shudraka (1905). The Little Clay Cart (Mṛcchakaṭika). Harvard Oriental Series. Vol. 9. Translated by Ryder, Arthur William. Cambridge, MA: Harvard University.
- Shudraka (1937a). The Toy-cart of Clay. Translated by Paranjpe, Vasudeva Gopala. Pune: V.G. Paranjpe. OCLC 41294563.
- Shudraka (1937b). Mrcchakatika Of Śūdraka. Translated by Karmarkar, R. D. Pune: Aryabhushan Press.
- Shudraka (1938). Mrcchakatikā: The Little Clay Cart: a drama in ten acts. Translated by Oliver, Revilo Pendelton. Urbana: University of Illinois Press. OCLC 6271087.
- Shudraka (1939). The Little Clay Cart: a play in ten acts by King Shudraka. University of Calcutta Publication. Vol. 79. Translated by Basu, Satyendra Kumar. Calcutta. OCLC 752790753.
- Shudraka (1956). The Padmaprābhṛtakam: an ancient bhāna assigned to Śūdraka. Translated by Loman, Johannes Reinoud Abraham. Amsterdam: Uitgeverij de Driehoek. OCLC 24889243.
- Shudraka (1962) [1924]. The Mrichchhakatika of Sudraka. Translated by Kāle, M(oreshvar) R(amchandra) (New ed.). Bombay: Booksellers Publishing Co.
- Shudraka (2009). The Little Clay Cart. Translated by Acharya, Diwakar. New York: New York University Press. ISBN 978-0-8147-0729-6.
- Shudraka (2018). The Clay Toy-Cart: Mrchchakatikam. Translated by Rajappa, Padmini. Haryana: India Penguin Classics. ISBN 978-0143428473. OCLC 1022945795.

==== Śyāmilaka ====
- Śyāmilaka (1976). Pādatāḍitaka of Śyāmilaka. Vol. 2: Translation. Translated by Schokker, G.H.; Worseley, P.J. Dordrecht: Springer Netherlands. ISBN 978-9027704252.

==== Umāpati Upādhyāya ====
- Umāpati Upādhyāya (1917). "The Pārijāta-Harana of Umāpati Upādhyāya". Journal of the Bihar and Orissa Research Society. III (1). Translated by Grierson, George: 20–98.
- Umāpati Upādhyāya (1924). "Traivikramam". Shama'a (April). Translated by Rama Pisharoti, K.: 213–222. OCLC 504425724.

==== Vararuchi ====
- Vararuchi (1926). "The Ubhayabhisarika of Vararuci". The Calcutta Review. 20 (July–Sept). Translated by Sen, Sukumar: 127–47.

==== Vedanta Desika ====
- Desika, Sri Vedanta (1917). Sankalpa-Sûryôdaya, or The Dawn of the Divine Will. Vol. 1 (Acts I-V). Translated by Narayanacharya, K.; Iyengar, D. Raghunathaswamy. Srirangam: Sri Vani Vilas Press.

==== Vishakhadatta ====
- Vishakhadatta (1916a) [1900]. The Mudrarakshasa. Translated by Kāle, M(oreshvar) R(amchandra) (3rd revised ed.). Bombay: The Oriental Publishing Company.
- Vishakhadatta (1916b). Mudrarakshasa. Translated by Shastri, Vasudeva Abhyankar; Abhyanker, Kashinath Vasudeva. Ahmedabad: Nandlal C. Bodiwala.
- Vishakhadatta (1919). The Mudra-rakshasa: a Sanskrit drama. Translated by Chakravarti, Srish Chandra (2nd ed.). Mymensingh: Bhattacharyya & Son. OCLC 66019742.
- Vishakhadatta (1930) [1900]. Mudrarakshasa; or The Signet Ring. Translated by Dhruva, K(eśavalāla) H(arshadarāya) (3rd ed.). Pune: Oriental Book Agency.
- Vishakhadatta (1940). Mudrārāksasa of Viśākhadatta. Translated by Karmarkar, R. D. Pune.
- Vishakhadatta (1944). Mudrā-rākshasa; or, The Signet Ring, a play in seven acts. Translated by Pandit, Ranjit Sitaram. Bombay: New Book Co. OCLC 2782686.
- Vishakhadatta (1948). Mudrārākṣasam of Viśākha-Datta. Translated by Devadhar, C[hintamani] R[amachandra]; Bedekar, V. M. Bombay: Keshav Bhikaji Dhawale. OCLC 31173636.
- Vishakhadatta (1956) [1918]. Visakhadatta's Mudra-Rakshasam. Translated by Ray, Saradaranjan; Ray, Kumudranjan (3rd revised and enlarged ed.). Calcutta: Nalanda Press. OCLC 642949557.
- Vishakhadatta (2005). Rākṣasa's Ring. Translated by Coulson, Michael. New York: New York University Press. ISBN 978-0-8147-1661-8.

==== Multiple authors ====
- Buitenen, J. A. B. van (1968). Two Plays of Ancient India. New York: Columbia University Press. ISBN 9780231030465. OCLC 654476.
- Coulson, Michael (1981). Three Sanskrit Plays: Śakuntalā by Kālidása; Rākshasa's Ring by Viśākhadatta; Mālati and Mādhava by Bhavabhūti. Harmondsworth: Penguin Books. ISBN 978-0140443745.
- Dezső, Csaba; Vasudeva, Somadeva (2009). The Quartet of Causeries. New York: New York University Press. ISBN 978-0-8147-1978-7.
- Lal, P. (1964). Great Sanskrit Plays. New York: New Directions. ISBN 978-0811200790.
- Skilton, Andrew (2009). How the Nāgas were Pleased by Harsha; & The Shattered Thighs by Bhāsa. New York: New York University Press. ISBN 978-0-8147-4066-8.
- Wilson, Horace Hayman (1835a) [1827]. Select Specimens of the Theatre of the Hindus. Vol. I (Second ed.). London: Parbury, Allen.
- Wilson, Horace Hayman (1835b) [1827]. Select Specimens of the Theatre of the Hindus. Vol. II (Second ed.). London: Parbury, Allen.

=== Other references ===
- Keith, Arthur Berriedale (1924). The Sanskrit Drama in its origin, development, theory & practice. Oxford: Clarendon Press.
- Raghavan, V. (1959). "A Bibliography of English Translations of Sanskrit Dramas". Indian Literature. 3 (1): 141–153. ISSN 0019-5804. JSTOR 23329669.
- Schuyler, Montgomery (1991) [1905]. A Bibliography of the Sanskrit Drama. New Delhi: Asian Educational Services. ISBN 978-81-206-0073-7.
