= List of Sanskrit dramatists =

This is a list of those who have authored Sanskrit-language plays or dramatic works, in roughly chronological order.

- Aśvaghoṣa
  - Śāriputraprakaraṇa
- Bhāsa
  - Svapnavāsavadattā
  - Pratijñāyaugandharāyaṇa
  - Cārudatta
  - Ūrubhaṅga
  - Karnabhāra
  - Pañcarātra
  - Dūtavākya
  - Dūtaghaṭotkaca
  - Madhyamavyāyoga
  - Abhiṣekanāṭaka
  - Bālacarita
  - Avimāraka
  - Pratimānāṭaka
- Śūdraka
  - Mṛcchakaṭikā
  - Vīṇāvāsavadattā
  - Padmaprābhṛtaka
- Candragomin
  - Lokānanda
- Kālidāsa
  - Abhijñānaśākuntala
  - Vikramorvaśīya
  - Mālavikāgnimitra
- Viśākhadatta
  - Mudrārākṣasa
  - Devīcandragupta
  - Abhisārikāvañcitaka
  - Rāghavānanda
- Harṣavardhana
  - Ratnāvalī
  - Priyadarśikā
  - Nāgānanda
- Mahendravikrama Pallava
  - Mattavilāsaprahasana
- Vararuci
  - Ubhayābhisārikā
- Śyāmilaka
  - Pādatāḍitaka
- Śaktibhadra
  - Āścaryacūḍāmaṇi
- Jayantabhaṭṭa
  - Āgamaḍambara
- Bhaṭṭanārāyaṇa
  - Veṇīsaṃhāra
- Bhavabhūti
  - Mālatīmādhava
  - Mahāvīracarita
  - Uttararāmacarita
- Yaśovarman
  - Rāmābhyudaya
- Murāri
  - Anargharāghava
- Rājaśekhara
  - Bālarāmāyaṇa
  - Bālabhārata
  - Viddhaśālabhañjikā
  - Pracanḍapāṇḍava
