= Ratnavali =

7th-century Sanskrit play by Harsha

Ratnavali (रत्नावली )
- Original language: Sanskrit
- Written by: Harsha
- Characters: Udayana; Ratnavali
- Subject: Comedy Of Court Life
- Genre: Comedy
- Setting: Kaushambi, India

Ratnavali (Devanagari: रत्नावली ) (transl.- Jewel Necklace or Precious Garland) is a Sanskrit drama about a beautiful princess named Ratnavali, and a great king named Udayana. It is attributed to the Indian emperor Harsha (606–648). It is a Natika in four acts. One of the first textual references to the celebration of Holi, the festival of Colours have been found in this text.

Ratnāvalī subtitled (rajaparikatha) is also the title of a 3rd-century CE Buddhist philosophical work by Nagarjuna, a discourse addressed to an Indian king (possibly a Satavahana monarch).

== Main characters ==
- Udayana (aka Vatsaraja)- The hero, King of Kaushambi
- Ratnavali (Sagarika)- The heroine, daughter of King Vikramabahu
- Vasavadatta - Queen, wife of Udayana
- Susangata - Bosom friend of Sagarika
- Vasantaka (Vidusaka)- The hero's companion and Court-wit
- Yaugandharayana- The Chief Minister of Kaushambi
- Vikramabahu- The King of Sinhala
- Vijayavarma- Commander-in-chief of the King
- Babravya- The Chamberlain of the King
- Vasubhuti- The Minister of Vikramabahu
- Aindrajalika- A magician
- Medhavini (Sarika)- A talking bird

== Synopsis ==
Udayana, King of Kaushambi, is both valiant and romantic. He is happily married to Vasavadatta, princess of a neighboring kingdom, and the story of their courtship and wedding is the subject of an earlier work, Svapnavasavadattam, written by Bhāsa.

Udayana is well-served by Yaugandharayana, an extremely loyal and astute, if rather presumptuous and devious minister. Yaugandharayana now wishes the king to marry Ratnavali, princess of the distant island kingdom of Simhala (presumably Sri Lanka). This is because a sage had prophesied that the man who marries Ratnavali would become a Sarvabhauma (Emperor). Incidentally, Ratnavali's father, king Vikramabahu of Simhala, is Vasavadatta's uncle. He is aware that Udayana and Vasavadatta are unusually close to each other (because they had married for love), and that a second wife would either be unhappy herself or make his niece Vasavadatta unhappy. He is therefore initially reluctant to accept the proposal of marriage which the minister makes to him. While the envoys from Kaushambi are still in Simhala with the proposal, the news reaches them that Queen Vasavadatta is dead, having perished in a fire which engulfed a hunting camp at Lavanaka. This news is in fact a falsehood initiated by the devious minister in order to facilitate the second marriage. King Vikramabahu is however taken in by the ploy, and agrees to give his daughter in marriage to Udayana. The necessary preparations are made, and Princess Ratnavali embarks on a ship to make the voyage to Kaushambi and her new life as queen of that kingdom.

Unfortunately, a storm crosses their path and the ship gets wrecked. Ratnavali alone is rescued by a passing merchant ship, and reaches the mainland safely. She however does not reveal her identity as princess of Simhala to the people who rescue her, because she is fearful of being held for political ransom, that her father or fiancée will be made to give up territories to secure her release. She therefore pretends to be suffering from amnesia. The merchants who rescue her are impressed by her rich garments, her refined speech and cultivated manners. They infer from all this that she is a lady of noble birth. Therefore, when they reach their native land (which is Kaushambi, by a coincidence), they place the nameless maiden in the custody of minister Yaugandharayana. By this time, news of the shipwreck and the loss of Princess Ratnavali has reached Kaushambi. The minister immediately recognizes that the girl rescued from the sea and suffering from amnesia is almost certainly the princess. He also sees the situation as an opportunity to reconcile Vasavadatta to the idea of receiving a co-wife. He gives the rescued girl a new name, "Sagarika," ("Ocean-lady"), takes her to the queen and asks her to keep the homeless waif as a maid. The queen agrees, and "Sagarika" becomes Vasavadatta's maid.

Once, in the cupid festival, Sagarika sees Udayana and instantly falls in love with him. Sagarika sits in a grove and keeps herself occupied in drawing Udayana's picture and fantasizing about him. Her shrewd friend Susangatha finds her, takes the picture into her hands and draws the picture of Sagarika by the side of the king. Sagarika confesses her love to Susangatha and a bird Sarika hears the conversation. Suddenly, there is a panic in the grove because of an escaped monkey and the maidens run away from there.

After a while, the Udayana and his jester enter the grove and hear the bird Sarika reproduce the ladies' conversation. They find the picture Sagarika and Susangatha have drawn, and Udayana finds it alluring. By this time, the two maidens return and overhear the conversation of the king and his jester, and see that Udayana is interested in Sagarika. Susangatha then makes a plan to bring Udayana and Sagarika together, but Vasavadatta (Udayana's first wife) also finds the picture when walking in the grove. Susangatha's plan is destroyed by the angry Vasavadatta and she leaves the grove without accepting Udayana's words of appeasement.

In the third act, the jester and Susangata hatch a plan to make Udayana and Sagarika meet. Sagarika disguises herself as Vasavadatta, and Susangata as her maid. They go to meet Udayana, who has been told of the plan and is expecting Sagarika to come in Vasavadatta's disguise. But the real Vasavadatta learns of this plan and also sets off to meet Udayana. Vasavadatta reaches him first, but Udayana mistakes her for Sagarika and declares that he loves her. Vasavadatta is very angry at Udayana for the second time, and reproaches him and walks away. Sagarika learns that their plan has again been foiled, and ties a noose to her neck wanting to commit suicide. Meanwhile, Udayana is frantically searching for the real Vasavadatta, and finds Sagarika about to die. He mistakes her for the real Vasavadatta, and saves her. Afterwards, the two recognize each other and finally they have a chance to declare their love. But at exactly the same moment, Vasavadatta, having calmed down, comes back to Udayana ready for appeasement. She is outraged for the third time on seeing Sagarika and Udayana together, and throws Sagarika into prison.

In the fourth act, no one knows where Sagarika is imprisoned by Vasavadatta. Suddenly, there is heard a news of the royal harem catching fire. It turns out that Sagarika is kept there, and Vasavadatta turns remorseful. She implores Udayana to run to her rescue. Udayana comes out safely from the fire with Sagarika. It is later revealed that the entire fire was a trick by a magician. At this tense moment, Babhravya and Vasubhuti recognize Sagarika to be the Simhala princess. Yaugandharayana enters and reveals himself to be the plotter. Vasavadatta now gladly brings about the marriage of Udayana and Ratnavali, her cousin, relying on the prophecy.

== Sources ==
A Natika should be based on an invented love-story according to Sahityadarpana. But this play, although a natika, does not present to us an entirely original story.

The Udayana legend is found in both Jaina and Bauddha literature besides the Kathasaritsagara, Brihatkathamanjari and Brihatkathalokasangraha. The Jaina legends are not earlier than the 12th century, while the Bauddha ones are of about 4th century.

Many distinguished poets of ancient India, who flourished before Harsha, have referred to the love of Udayana and Vasavadatta, and the devotion of Yougandharayana for his master Udayana. This shows how popular the story of Udayana was even in Ancient India. Kalidasa has referred to Udayana in his Meghaduta. Śudraka refers in his Mricchakatika to the devotion of minister Yaugandharayana to Udayana. Bhāsa has dramatized the story in his two plays Pratignayougandharayanam and Swapnavāsadattam.

In conclusion, it can be said that it is not unlikely that Harsha took the frame-work of the Udayana story from either the Bauddha literature or some early version of the Brihatkatha and dramatized it in his own way. Although the story is not entirely invented, it must be admitted that the treatment of it at Harsha's hands is quite original and that the play on the whole is a very charming one.

== Adaptations ==
The play has been adapted to film in Indian cinema as Ratnavali in 1922 by Jyotish Bannerjee and C. Legrand, in 1924 by Manilal Joshi, and in 1945 by Surendra Desai.

== See also ==
- List of Sanskrit plays in English translation
- Nagananda
- Priyadarsika
