= Priyadarśikā =

7th-century Sanskrit play by Harsha

Priyadarśikā (Devanagari: प्रियदर्शिका ) is a Sanskrit play attributed to king Harsha (606 - 648 CE). It was first translated into English by G. K. Nariman, A. V. Williams Jackson, and Charles J. Ogden and published by the Columbia University Press in 1923 as the tenth volume of the 13 volume Columbia University Indo-Iranian Series (1901–32).

== See also ==
- List of Sanskrit plays in English translation
- Ratnavali
- Nagananda
