= Gora Kabristan, Lahore =

Cemetery in Lahore, Pakistan

Gora Qabristan
- گورا قبارستان
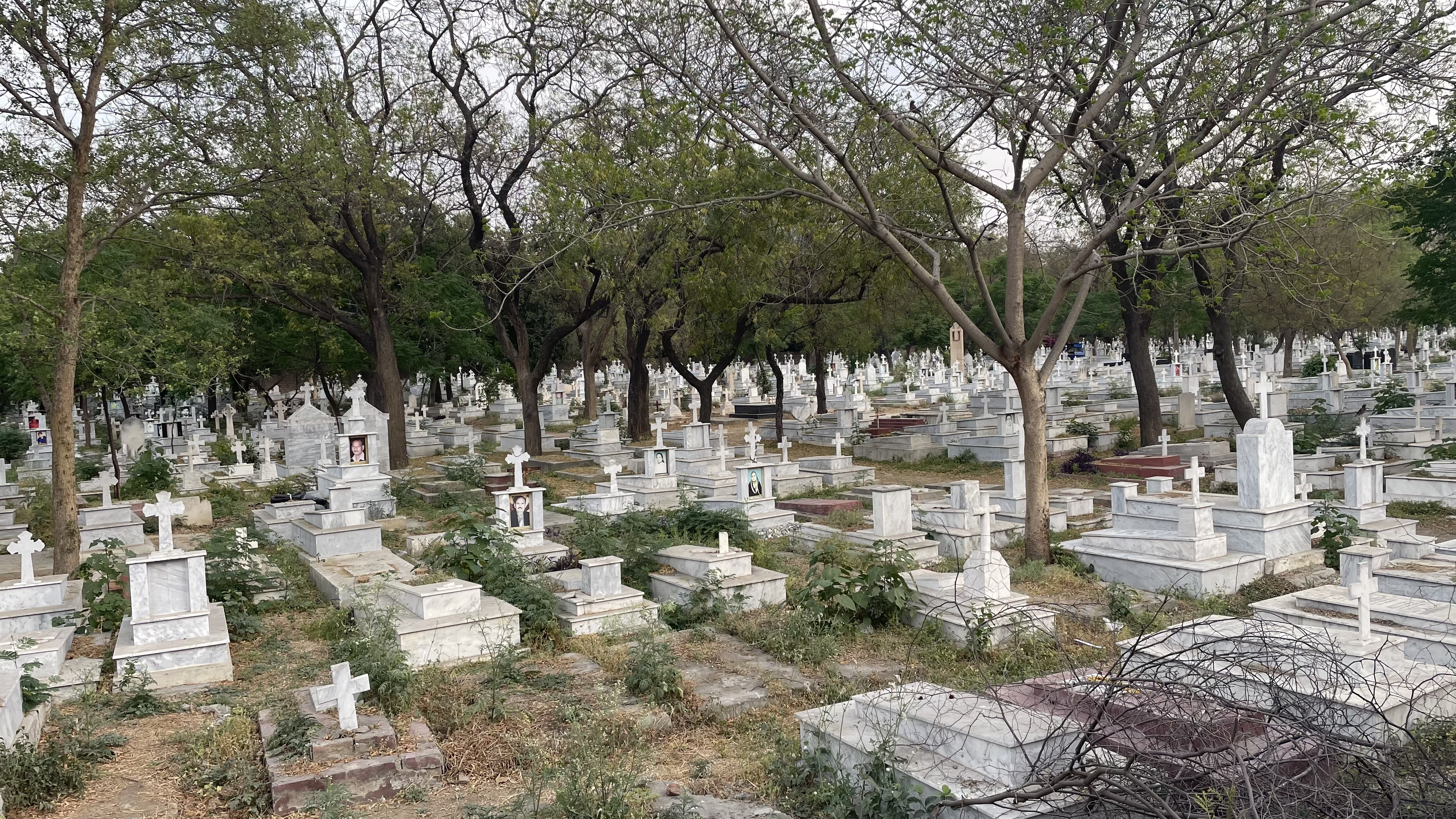
- A view overlooking the Gora Qabaristan in Lahore
- Interactive map of Gora Qabristan

Details
- Location: Jail Road, Lahore, Punjab
- Country: Pakistan
- Coordinates: 31°32′02″N 74°20′56″E
- Type: Christian
- Size: 20 acres

The Gora Kabristan, also spelled Gora Qabristan and translated as 'white people's graveyard' (Panjabi / Urdu: گورا قبرِستان), is one of the oldest Christian burial grounds in Lahore, Punjab, Pakistan.

== Location ==
The graveyard is situated adjacent to Forman Christian College, in close proximity to the Lahore Gymkhana Club's golf course on Jail Road and Zafar Ali Road.

== History ==
It was developed after establishment of British Raj in the Panjab Region as their primary Cemetery in Lahore. The name literally means the white graveyard. 'Gora'(Punjabi pronunciation: [/goˑɾä˧/] ) is a term by Aryans to refer to pale colour, light skinned or white people. Therefore, a more accurate translation would be "white people's graveyard." The term is not always necessarily used in a derogatory manner.

== Notable interments ==
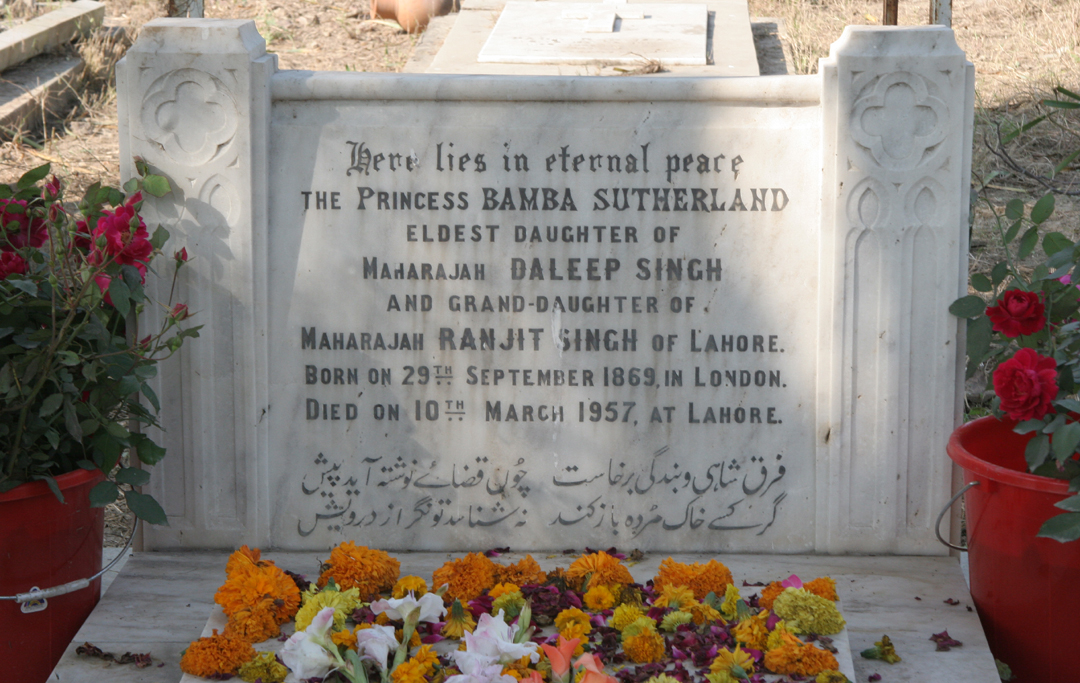
Headstone of Princess Bamba Sutherland (1869–1957), daughter of Maharajah Duleep Singh and granddaughter of Maharajah Ranjit Singh (2006)

Many notable personalities of British era and early Pakistani era are buried there, including:

- Cecil Chaudhry
- Alvin Robert Cornelius
- Geoffrey Langlands
- Princess Bamba Sutherland
- Alfred Cooper Woolner
- Satya Prakash Singha
