= Ubhayābhisārika =

Sanskrit satirical monologue by Vararuchi

Ubhayābhisārika is a Sanskrit single-player satirical play formatted as a monologue. It was written by Vararuchi, who is thought to have lived in the Gupta period The literal meaning of the title is "Both Go to Meet" or "The Two Have a Tryst". However, "abhisārika" usually refers to a courtesan or prostitute.

The only character in the play is Vita, which, loosely translated, means a lecher or a satyr. Vita knows all the courtesans of the city (Kusumapura, a part of Pataliputra or the modern Patna) by their name, ancestry and their partners in sexual congress. Besides the courtesans, a remarkable character is a eunuch who is portrayed as being as seductive as any courtesan.

The play is a good example of the social life of the upper class of medieval India. In particular, it reveals the epicurean lifestyles of the rich and powerful, the considerable sexual freedom enjoyed by courtesans, and the avaricious nature of their mothers who were once courtesans themselves.

== See also ==
- List of Sanskrit plays in English translation
