= Nagananda =

7th-century Sanskrit play by Harsha

Nagananda (Devanagari: नागानन्द) (transl. - Joy of the Serpents) is a Sanskrit play attributed to emperor Harsha (ruled 606 C.E. - 648 C.E.).

Nagananda is among the most acclaimed Sanskrit dramas. Through five acts, it tells the popular story of a prince of divine magicians (vidyādharas) called Jimútaváhana, and his self-sacrifice to save the Nagas. The unique characteristic of this drama is the invocation to Gautama Buddha in the Nandi verse, which is considered one of the best examples of the dramatic compositions.

Nagananda is the story of how prince Jimutavahana gives up his own body to stop a sacrifice of a Naga prince to the divine Garuda.

Harsha's play Nāgānanda tells the story of the Bodhisattva Jīmūtavāhavana, and the invocatory verse at the beginning is dedicated to the Buddha, described in the act of vanquishing Māra (so much so that the two verses, together with a third, are also preserved separately in Tibetan translation as the *Mārajit-stotra). Shiva's consort Gauri plays an important role in the play, and raises the hero to life using her divine power.

== Characters ==
- Jimutavahana – The Hero and Vidhyadhara Prince
- Jimutaketu – The father of hero
- Vidushaka (Atreya) – The friend of the hero
- Mitravasu – Son of Vishvavasu and brother of the heroine
- Shankachuda – A serpent, intended to be the victim of Garuda
- Garuda – King of birds and enemy of the serpents
- Kanchukin – Superintendent of the harem
- Malayavati – The heroine and daughter of king Vishvavasu
- Devi – The mother of the hero
- Vriddha – The mother of Shankhachuda
- Gauri – The Goddess
- Chaturika – Maid of Malayavati
- Manoharika – Maid of Malayavati
- Navamalika – Maid of Malayavati

== Synopsis ==
The first act of the play opens in the penance-grove near the temple of Gauri. Jimutavahana with his friend Atreya, the Vidushaka is in search of a suitable place of residence on the Malaya Mountains, southern part of the Western Ghats, as his old parents have expressed a desire to stay there. He would spend his youth in serving the parents, as he considers such a service far above the enjoyment of the pleasures of kingdom. He had done everything in his power to make his subjects happy, made the kingdom secure and has entrusted the kingdom to his ministers. He disregards the warning of Atreya that his kingdom faces danger from Matanga, a longtime enemy of the kingdom. Moving about, both of them are struck by the grandeur of the mountain and decide to stay there. Here, they happen to hear the ravishing tunes of melodious music. They enter the temple of Gauri but hide themselves to find out who was singing- Princess Malayawati of the Siddhas. Through her conversation with her maid they learn that she is a maiden and that Gauri revealed herself to her in a dream and conferred a boon that the Emperor of Vidhyadharas, Jimutavahana will marry her. The two friends reveal themselves only to make Malayavati embarrassed. Malayavati leaves the temple with a hermit without knowing Jimutavahana's true identity. The hero and heroine fall in love with each other, though they are yet strangers to each other.

After a few misunderstandings regarding whom Jimutavahana loves and Jimutavahana proving that he loves Malayawati after he shows the portrait he painted of her, Malayawati and Jimutavahana marry as per their parents' wishes. Many days later, prince Mitravasu, the brother of Malayawati, arrives with grave news that Matanga has seized control of Jimutavahana's kingdom. He also implores Jimutavahana to order their troops into battle in order to reclaim his rightful throne. Jimutavahana declines, saying that someone like him, who is willing to sacrifice himself for another, cannot allow bloodshed over a mere kingdom. Meanwhile, Jimutavahana discovers a white mountain, which is revealed to be a pile of bones. Garuda, the divine eagle, was hostile to the Nagas. To stop Garuda's onslaught, the Naga King Vasuki agreed to send one of his subjects as a sacrifice for Garuda every day. Jimutavahana notices that a Naga named Shankhachuda is chosen to be the sacrifice for the day. Shankhachuda's mother laments her son's fate. Before the appointed time, Shankhachuda and his mother decide to worship Lord Aavilokiteshwara. Meanwhile, Jimutavahana decides to save Shankhachuda. He wears a red robe(originally given to him by his in-laws for his marriage), marking him as the sacrifice and sits on the altar, awaiting Garuda's arrival. Garuda seizes Jimutavahana and takes him to the mountain to devour him.

Meanwhile, Shankhachuda returns to the spot, realises what has happened and takes Jimutavahana's family to the mountain. However, it is too late- by the time they reach the summit, Jimutavahana dies before their eyes. Meanwhile, Garuda realises that Jimutavahana is a human, not a Naga as he had presumed. Filled with regret, Garuda fetches a vessel of Amrita from Indra and sprinkles the nectar on Jimutavahana's corpse as well as the bones of all his victims. Jimutavahana and the Nagas resurrect and happily reunite with their loved ones. Since Jimutavahana's selflessness caused many Nagas to resurrect, the grateful Vasuki bestows the epithet of "Nagananda" on Jimutavahana. The latter returns to his kingdom and becomes the emperor of the Vidyadharas to respect the will of his subjects.

== Sources ==
The story of Jimutavahana is found in the Kathasaritsagara of Somadeva and Brihatkathamanjari of Kshemendra both written in the 11th century A.D. The story of Nagananda follows closely the shorter narrations in both these books. Both these books are the Sanskrit versions of the Brihatkatha of Gunadhya in Paishachi language, composed about the 1st century A.D. But neither the Kathasaritsagara nor the Brihatkathamanjari, both composed in the 11th century A.D. can be accepted as the source of Nagananda which was composed in the 7th century A.D. Sri Harsha has added his own ideas and has deviated from the main story in Brihathkatha in many places. It must be admitted that the treatment of it at Harsha's hands is quite original and that the play on the whole is a very charming and fascinating one.

== Performance history ==
The play prominently figures in the repertoire of Kūṭiyāṭṭam, Kerala's traditional Sanskrit theater and the scene in which Garuḍa lifts up Jīmūtavāhana was enacted on an open stage. The play was produced in January 2008 at Panaji; Goa ( India ) in Marathi by Prabhakar Sanskritic Sanstha following the conventions propagated in the Natyasastra. Nagananda play was designed by Saish Deshpande, translated & directed by Anagha Deshpande whereas the Natyadharmi Abhinaya was conceived by Dr. Sharmila Rao. The play is now also available in Marathi text.

The 2008 production of "Nagananda" was adjudged as the best experimental theatre production along with best research based production both by Maharashtra state Dept. of Art & Culture as well as Akhil Bharatiya Marathi Natya Parishad. this product by the young theatre artistes from Goa has been documented for archival purpose by All India Radio, Panaji & also by Doordarshan; Goa. The Video is open for referential purpose.

== Translations ==
=== English Translations ===
- Palmer Boyd; Nágánanda, Or The Joy of the Snake-world: A Buddhist Drama in Five Acts ISBN 9781347250563
- Andrew Skilton; How the nāgas were pleased by Harṣa & The shattered thighs by Bhāsa ISBN 9780814740668

== See also ==
- Ratnavali
- Priyadarsika
- Bana
- Kadambari
- List of Sanskrit plays in English translation
