= Karnabharam =

Sanskrit play attributed to Bhāsa

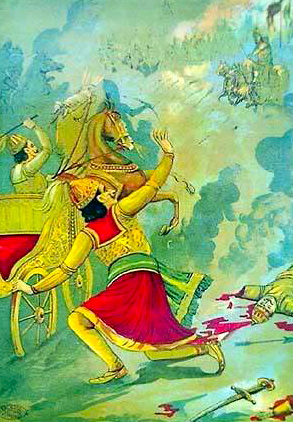
The death of Karna

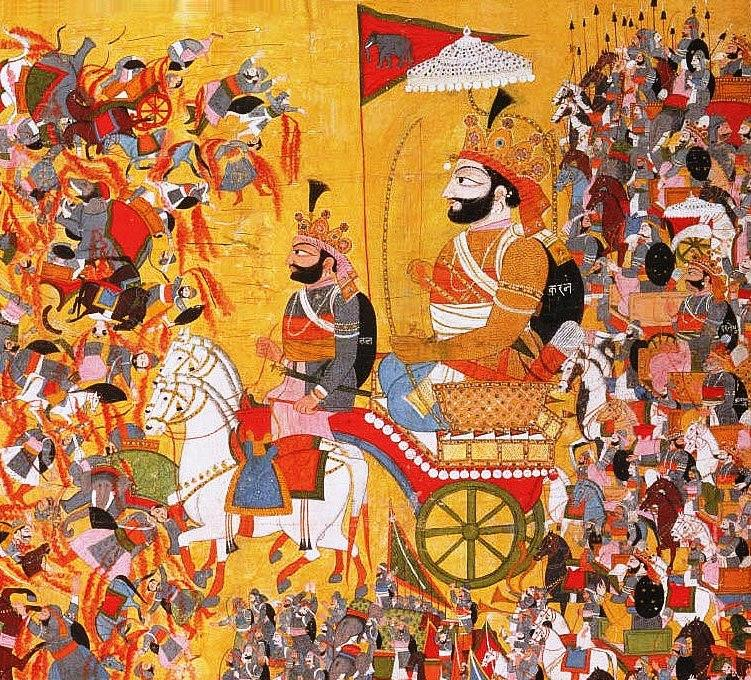
Karna at Kurukshetra

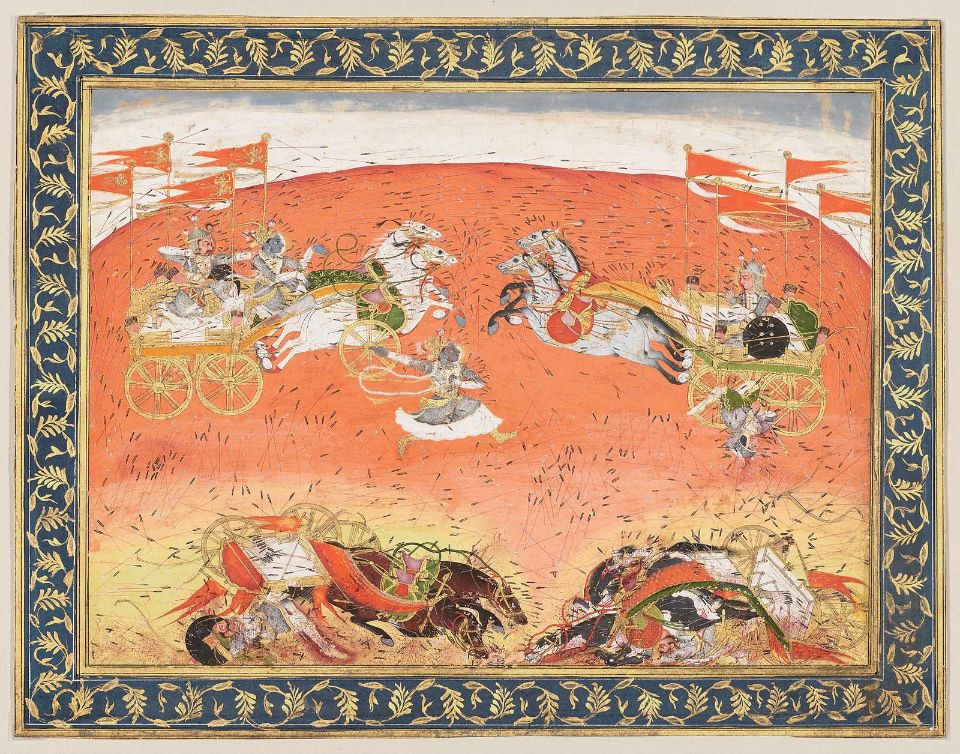
The war between Arjuna and Karna

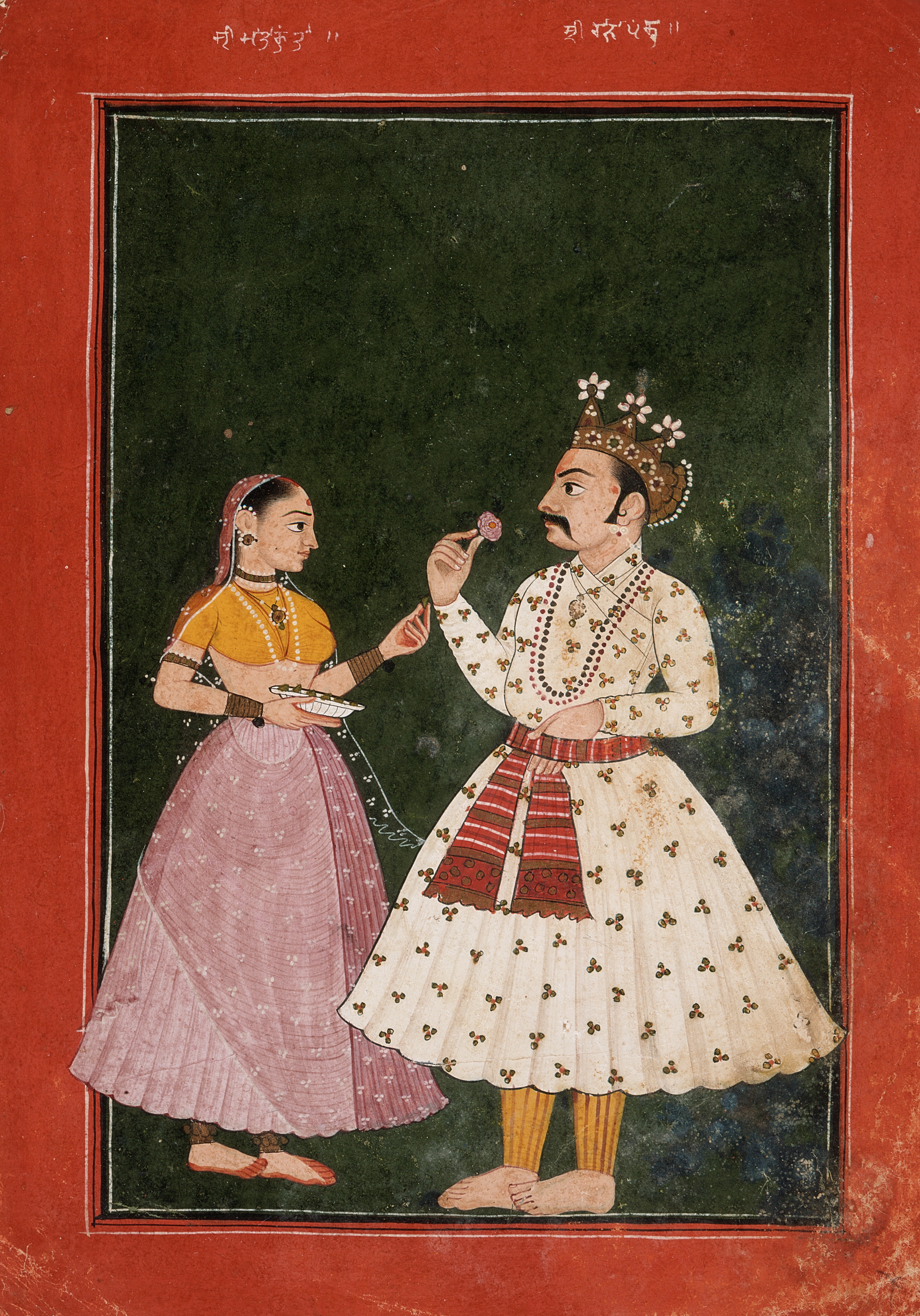
Kunti Devi, Karna's mother with her husband Pandu

Karṇabhāram or The Anguish of Karna (literally: The Burden of Karna) is a Sanskrit one-act play written by the Indian dramatist Bhasa, an Indian playwright complimented even by the Kalidasa in the beginning of his play Malavikagnimitram. The play describes the mental pain of Karna on the previous day of the Kurukshetra War. Karṇabhāram is essentially the retelling of an episode of the Indian epic Mahabharata but the story is presented in a different perspective in the play. It is perhaps the only potential tragedy in the classic Sanskrit literature, presented in a form that comes closest to the "Vyayoga" (Sanskrit: व्यायोग) form of one-act play. That is so perhaps because the Natya Shastra ordains the playwrights to create plays for recreation, and essentially create happy endings. In Karnabharam, the tragedy does not occur on-stage (Unlike Urubhanga, a tragedy that shows Duryodhana dying - again, written by Bhasa). Karnabharam shows the valiant, generous, righteous Karna riding out towards the battle-ground, where his death under heart-wrenching circumstances is certain. The basic plot of this play is inspired by Mahabharata.

Karnabharam is known today as one of the 13 manuscripts of plays which are generally attributed to Bhasa with some dissent. The Malayalam script of these plays was found on 105 palm leaves, believed to be about 300 years old when found. Mahamahopadhyaya T. Ganapati Sastri made this discovery as part of his field research at the site called Manalikkar located in Kanyakumari district, which is now within the city of Trivandrum (now Thiruvananthapuram). The discovery of these manuscripts was made over a period starting from 1909 when ten plays and some parts of the eleventh play were found. None were carrying the name of their author. Soon after, two more were found and lastly, another intact play, ascertained as Dootavakyam was found - thus bringing the number of plays to 13.

== Synopsis ==
Karnabharam is the shortest and the least action-oriented among the plays written by Bhasa.

Major elements of this play are the Mangala Shloka, Prologue, Entry of the soldier, Anguish of Karna, Curse of Parashurama, Finding of inner brilliance by Karna, Donation of Kavacha and Kundala, Receiving of Vimala power and Bharat Vakya.

The play begins with a scene in which, a soldier sent by Duryodhana informs Karna that the time to go to the battlefield had arrived. Karna finds himself filled with extreme agony and grief that manifest themselves from his whole demeanor, which was ironic given that it was a day of great battle for him (Shloka-6). But, Karna cannot shake off his recent discovery of the fact that he was the eldest son of Kunti (Shloka-7), who did not want him to kill his arch enemy - and now also his younger brother - Arjuna (Shloka-8). Karna also remembers the event involving his Guru's curse. As he narrates these things to Shalya, the king of Madra and Karna's charioteer, Indra approaches Karna with a request for a great favor. Indra is in the attire of a Brahmin, and he does not reveal his identity. Karna offers him many things, all of which were refused by Indra, until the time when Karna offers his armor and earrings. Indra accepts and goes away. "Indra cheated you!", cries Shalya. "No, it was Indra who was cheated by me", responds Karna. This is a thought-provoking response, as the reader wonders how exactly did Karna cheat Indra. It is true that Indra was obliged, favored and even dwarfed, but how Karna thinks that Indra was cheated, is a question that does not have a ready answer.

When Karna promises Indra to give him whatever he wants, Indra blesses him with 'undying glory'. Karna wonders why, as it was customary, the receiver did not give the usual blessing of 'live long' (Sanskrit: दीर्घायु भव). Karna is suspicious but goes ahead with the gracious act of giving unconditionally and with unshaken faith. A little while later, a messenger sent by Indra arrives and gives him what Indra sent in reciprocation - a weapon named Vimla, which never failed in killing the target. Karna again responds valiantly that "I never seek the return on what I have gifted." (Sanskrit: दत्तस्य न प्रतिगृह्णामि) But, the messenger insists that he keep it "because of the request from a Brahmin." (Sanskrit: ननु ब्राह्मणवचनात् गृह्यताम्) Karna accepts and asks Shalya once again to take his chariot to where stands Arjuna (Sanskrit: यत्रासावर्जुनस्तत्रैव चोध्यतां मम रथ:).

Thus, the play starts with a messenger of Duryodhana and ends with a scene involving the messenger from Indra.

== Karna ==
Karna was the Grey Character warrior of ancient India as given in the Mahabharatha. He was the king of Anga kingdom. According to Mahabharatha, Karna, along with Arjuna, were the only warriors who had the capacity to conquer the entire world.

== Depiction of Karna ==
The play depicts Karna's mental agony a day before the Kurukshetra War, as he thinks about his past and his faith. The play projects the mortal anguish of a man unsure of his identity. Karna, the protagonist is heroic and pathetic at the same time as he tries to find his place between the mocking and adulation of social forces on one side and the taunting challenges of fate on the other.

The treatment of the play takes it beyond reality, beyond the caricature of farce into a realm that transcends the space and time and gets related to the social realities of today. Karna lingers in one’s consciousness as the symbol of Universal man in search of his own self-the ultimate dilemma of existence.

== Plot ==
The time and space of action is from the eleventh day in the war-field of Mahabharata.

The great warrior Karna, the son of Surya is seen disturbed and depressed in the war-field instead of being mighty and powerful. The play analyses the reasons.

He is worried of his birth, his caste and his social status. Whether he is the son of Kunti and Surya, or Radha and Adhiratha? The mockery and adulation of the society moulds his person and fate. For a while he is moved by the meaninglessness of the war where men kill each other. He says that irrespective of his victory or defeat, war is a real waste. This vision adds to his turbulence.

Karna tells Shalya about the curse given by his Guru, Parashurama. This episode is enacted by correlating the narration of the present with the enacting of the past. The astra advised by Parashurama is found powerless at the needed hour.

The entry of Indra disguised as a Brahmin, follows, who cunningly takes away the divine Kavacha and Kundala from Karna. He understands that the whole plot is masterminded by the shrewd Krishna and accepts his fate. The messenger from Indra offers a powerful weapon Vimala which can destroy one among the Pandavas.

Accepting the challenge from Arjuna and Krishna the revitalized Karna proceed to this ultimate fate heroically. Thus ends Bhasa’s play Karnabharam.

== Sources of the play ==
Jay bharata by Vyasa

1. Shanti Parva. Chapter 3. The story of Karna learning the 'Astravidya' (art of warfare) and divyastras (divine weapons) from Parasuram. The curse of the guru.
2. Vana Parva. Chapter. 310. The visit of Indra and the giving away of the armour and the ear rings in exchange for a magic power.
3. Udyogaparva. Chapter 146. Kunti’s request that her children may be spared. Karna’s promise (exception Arjuna)
4. Karna Parva: Karna’s march to the battlefield with Salya as the charioteer.

== Title of the play ==
'Bhara' or burden is the central theme. The word 'bhara' in the title may refer to

- The weight of the armour and the ear rings
- The thought of killing his own brothers.
- The thought of the three curses.
- The thought of his weapons becoming useless at the crucial time.
- The loss of the ear rings and the armour at the crucial time which increased his bhara or responsibility as the commander of the army.

== Deviation from Vyasa's Mahabharata ==
The play has many deviations from the original Mahabharata and all deviations are purposeful. Three major changes are:

First, the play is characterized by a friendly dialogue between Karna and Shalya, his Charioteer. Shalya is consistently empathetic towards Karna, and even concerned about his interests - he warns Karna not to give away his armor and earrings to the brahmin-looking stranger. In the original story, Shalya was the king of Madra, and sympathetic towards the Pandavas. Karna had accepted to be a General of the Kaurava army provided Shalya drove his chariot. Shalya could not deny Duryodhana's request, but keeps a condition of his own - that Karna would say or do nothing in response to whatever he said to him. Karna accepts, and on the battlefield Shalya continually criticizes Karna, reminding him of his low birth and other failures in life. The Karna of the Mahabharata (in Karnaparva) fights bravely in spite of nagging criticism of Shalya. The Karna of Karnabharam finds an ally in Shalya.

Second, in the original, Surya - Karna's father visits him in his dream and warns him of a possible cheating by Indra (Vanaparva). Karna of Karnabharam is not aided or supported by anyone from his family, and it appears ironic that Indra, Arjun's biological father goes to Karna to protect his son, while Surya, the biological father of Karna, watches on from the sky. In the original, Indra feigning as a brahmin asks for the armor and earrings, and Karna obliges. In Karnabharam, Karna offers one thing after another, refused by Indra and in the end, offers on his own, his armor and earrings. Karna of Karnabharam is a compulsive giver. Also, in the original, when asked by Indra to get something in return for a great act of charity, Karna asks for the ability to kill the enemy. In Karnabharam, a guilty Indra sends the weapon, which Karna refuses to accept, saying that he does not seek the return on charity. Bhasa's Karna is gallant and very, very generous.

Third, the mental agony experienced by Karna is an exploration and presentation by Bhasa. Although Karna's story appears in various parts of Mahabharata, all of them appearing together and serving the backdrop for Karna's intense stress, feeling of being let down in life and un-auspicious omens pointing at impending fate, Bhasa's Karna tells Shalya,

"हतोSपि लभते स्वर्गं जित्वा तु लभते यश: उभे बहुमते लोके नास्ति निष्फलता रणे ॥ १२॥

[Meaning: If killed, one attains heaven and if victorious, gains glory. Both are highly esteemed in this world - there is nothing like failure in war.]

Fourth, in the original, when Karna goes to Parashurama, he identifies himself as a brahmin. In Karnabhara, he simply tells him "नाहं क्षत्रिय:" (meaning: I am not a Kshatriya). It makes sense, because, if Karna did not know that Kunti was his mother until the announcement of war, then he only knew that his foster parents were Sutas - the charioteers of Duryodhana. In that case, Karna's statement that he was not a Kshatriya was probably not a lie. Again, in Mahabharata, Parashurama's curse is limited to use of Brahmastra by Karna. But in Karnabhara, the curse of Parashurama is, "Your weapons will be powerless at the moment of need (Shloka 10)." - this Karna of Bhasa faces a much more ominous threat.

Further, the time of Indra’s appearance in the play happens on the 17th day of the battle. In the Vyasa version, it happens much earlier.

== Major scenes ==
An interesting discussion around the major scenes of this play is found in Pusalkar. Selected parts appear below:

=== Mangala shloka (Sanskrit: मंगलश्लोक) ===
It is noticeable that the shloka seeking blessings from a deity is presented by the Sutradhara, who is introduced as "नान्द्यन्ते तत: प्रविशति सूत्रधार:।" (meaning: Sutradhara enters after Nandi). The Nandi occurs first, but we do not know how it was being performed in Bhasa's plays. After Nandi, the Sutradhara presents the auspicious shloka, a seeking blessing or wishing well for the audience.

It is also worth noting that the Mangala Shloka of Karnabharam seeks blessings of the Narasimha avatar of Vishnu. In this avatar, Vishnu is a furious and ferocious half-lion and half-man, who kills the demon Hiranyakashipu with his bare hands using the nails. Invocation of Narasimha may stir the emotions of fear and cast the dark shadows of killing and death, which is also indicative of the nature of the plot of the play.

=== Karna's anguish ===
Karna's memories of his mother's request not to kill his own brothers and the curse of his Guru are fresh in this scene. The battle of his life awaits him, as he is now the General of the Kaurava army. Yet, he knows that none of his expertise and his weapons will serve his will. Death is imminent in this case, as his adversary is none other than Arjuna, one of the greatest warriors of that time. As if reflecting this inner shadows, his horses and elephants also appear dull, weak and frightened. From Karna's narration to Shalya, one cannot help but sense Karna's distress: What was he being punished for? Was it his fault that he was the first son of unmarried Kunti? Was it his fault that a Shudra Charioteer adopted him? Was he really lying when he told his Guru that he was not a Kshatriya? In fact, rather than countering to the unfairness of the world by unfairness, Karna turned himself out as a great warrior and a philanthropist, a gracious giver, who gave unconditionally, without any expectations of returned favors. Yet, why did his enemy's father cheat him and robbed him of the only protection that was left with him? When the world was unapproving of him, refusing to recognize his true identity, only Duryodhana had helped him. Was it not a Dharma to act kindly towards someone who had been kind?

And yet, valiant Karna, the hero of Karnabharam, manages to retain his composure while telling the story of Parashurama's curse. Soon, cheating by Indra follows and Karna lives up to his reputation of the supreme donor - Daneshvari ((Sanskrit: दानेश्वरी). With unshaken valor, he asks Shalya to find Arjuna for him.

=== Vimala power ===
Indra seems curiously happy to have accomplished his goal of robbing Karna of his life-protecting armor and earrings with which he was born. He is now eager to watch the battle between Arjuna and Karna from the heavens by sitting on the back of his elephant Airavata. But, he also feels guilty of his own deceit, and so sends his messenger with an unfailing, deadly, single-use weapon called Vimala. Karna refuses it but accepts it only because he has never before refused a word of a Brahmin.

== Challenge in performing Karnabharam ==
Awasthi and Schechner (1988) note that the length of "Karnabharam" should be given its due importance. Karnabharam is a one-act play, and its reading time is short. However, the play contains a multitude of staging signs, and their variety increases its performance time greatly (p. 51). So much so, that according to the authors, Bhasa's Madhyama Vyagoga, Urubhanga and Karnabharam take four times as long as it takes to read.

== Staging ==
Karnabharam, the Sanskrit language play was staged at the Siri Fort Auditorium in New Delhi on 29 March 2001. The play was performed as part of the National Theatre Festival of National School of Drama. It was designed and directed by Kavalam Narayana Panicker. The play had a duration of 55 minutes. Indian film actor Mohanlal portrayed Karna in the play.

== Stories from Mahabharata forming the base of Karnabharam ==
Karnabharam is created by weaving together several instances and situations that have been mentioned in different parts of Mahabharata, but as it was customary, Bhasa made his own modifications discussed above. In the background is the story that identifies Karna as the son of Kunti, born of Surya (Sanskrit: सूर्य) at the time when she was still unmarried. Kunti felt ashamed of it, put Karna in a basket and floated him across the river. He was rescued and reared by a charioteer family.

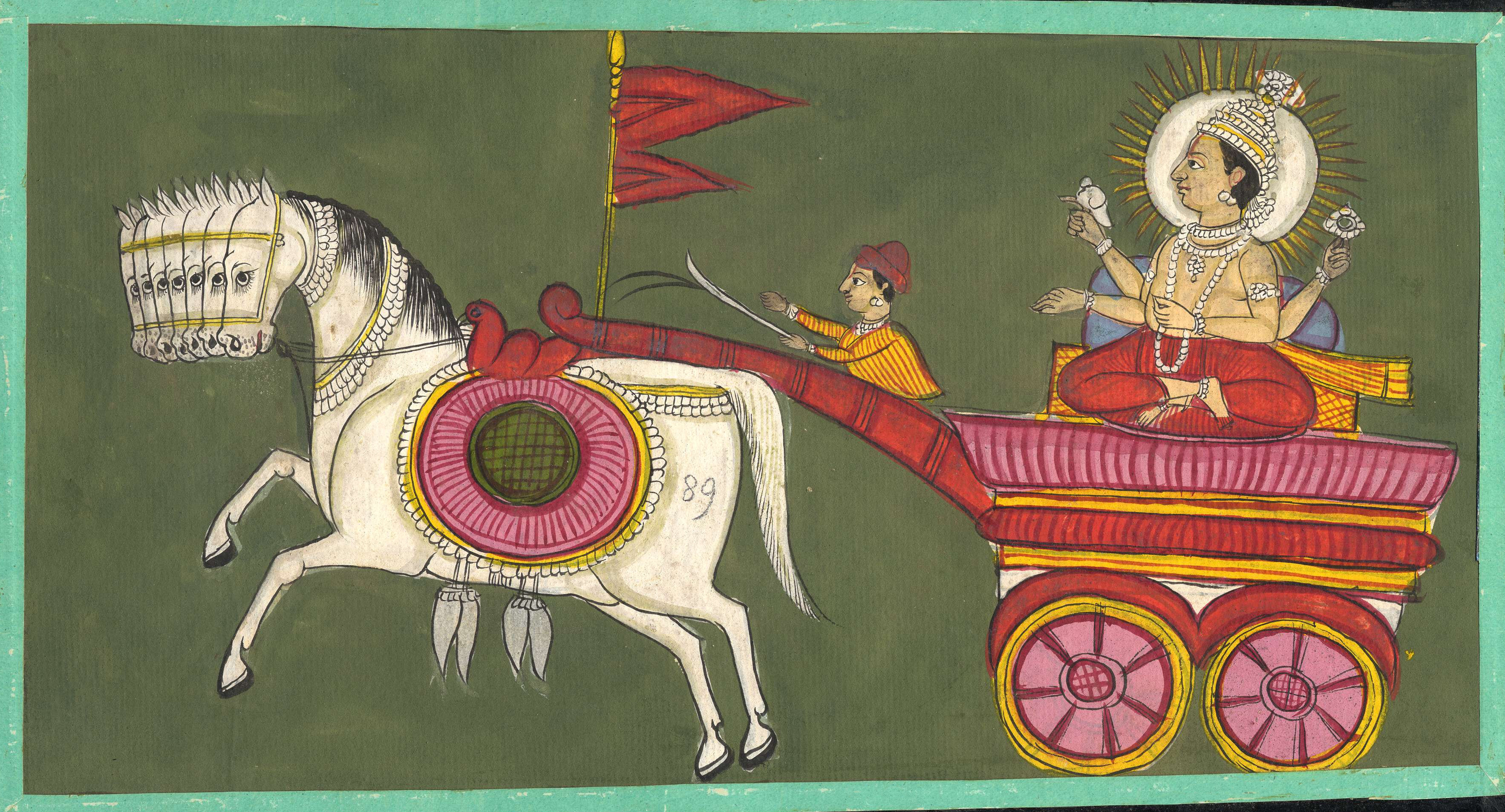

As the legend goes, Karna was born with a chest-armor (Sanskrit: कवच)and earrings (Sanskrit: कुण्डल) of Gold. Of course, after Kunti married the king Pandu (Sanskrit: पाण्डु), who was cursed to die if and when he attempted to make love, Kunti had three more sons (Yudhisthira, Arjuna and Bhima) by three different Gods. Kunti had a boon, given by Rishi Durvasa, which empowered her to invoke a god by chanting a mantra for obtaining a son. The mantra could be used five times. Because she had Karna at a very young age before her marriage as she used the mantra out of curiosity, Kunti abandoned Karna by putting him in a box and leaving the box afloat in the river. Now, before the great battle of Mahabharata, when Kunti knew that Karna had vowed to kill Arjuna in battle, she went to Karna, identified herself as his mother, and asked him to spare his brothers. Generous Karna, rather than asking her why she had remembered him after all these years, and asking if her sons won't kill him if he did not kill them, assured her that she will remain the mother of five Pandavas as always - either he or Arjun would die.

The second story is that of Karna's sojourn with his Guru, Parashurama. Parashurama was a sworn enemy of Kshatriyas and he taught archery (Dhanurvidya) only to the Brahmins. Karna, however, had decided to learn from Parashurama only, so at the time of admission, when Parashurama asked for his Jati, Karna said he was a Brahmin - which was a lie. Then, once upon a time, when Parashurama had taken his disciples in the forest, Parashurama slept with his head on Karna's lap during siesta. A bug sat on Karna's thigh and began to bite so viciously that Karna started bleeding. Not wanting to disturb his Guru's sleep, Karna did not move or even make a sound. But the stream of warm blood touched Parashurama, who woke up and realized that such fortitude was beyond a Brahmin. When confronted by the Guru, Karna admitted that he had lied about his Jati. Angered by this treachery, Parashurama cursed Karna that he would forget all his lie-begotten vidya in the moment of true need.

The third story is about Karna's generosity and the vow of charity that remained unbroken even at the cost of his own life. Every morning, Karna performed puja of Surya, followed by a session of charity wherein he granted all the favors requested by the people who came to him for help. His reputation spread far and wide, and people lined up waiting for Karna's Surya-puja to be over, so that they could request for Karna's charity. Just before the day of battle when Karna took part in it (he had abstained initially as he did not accept the generalship of Bhishma), Indra, who fathered Arjuna, approached Karna in the form of a Brahmin and asked for Karna's gold chest-armour and earrings. Karna suspected treachery, but since he did not want to break his vow of granting every wish made after his puja, he gave those two objects away. However, he knew that without those two divine objects on his body, he was vulnerable to death. Indra felt guilty at his own treachery and reciprocated by giving to Karna a single-use weapon that could never fail and caused certain death of the enemy for whom it was used.

== See also ==
- List of Sanskrit plays in English translation
