= Charu Deva Shastri =

Charu Deva Shastri (चारुदेवशास्त्री; 1896–1987) was a Sanskrit grammarian. He is also the father of the Sanskrit scholar Satya Vrat Shastri.

== Works ==
- Panini Reinterpreted (Translation of Vyakaranacandrodaya )
- उपसर्गार्थचन्द्रिका
- Vyakaranacandrodaya
- Vyākaraṇa-mahābhāṣya (prathama āhṛakatraya) kā Hindī anuvāda tathā vivaraṇa.
- शब्दापशब्दविवेक
- वाक्यमुक्तावली
- Gandhicharita
