= Saradaranjan Ray =

Professor of mathematics at Aligarh University

- সারদারঞ্জন রায়
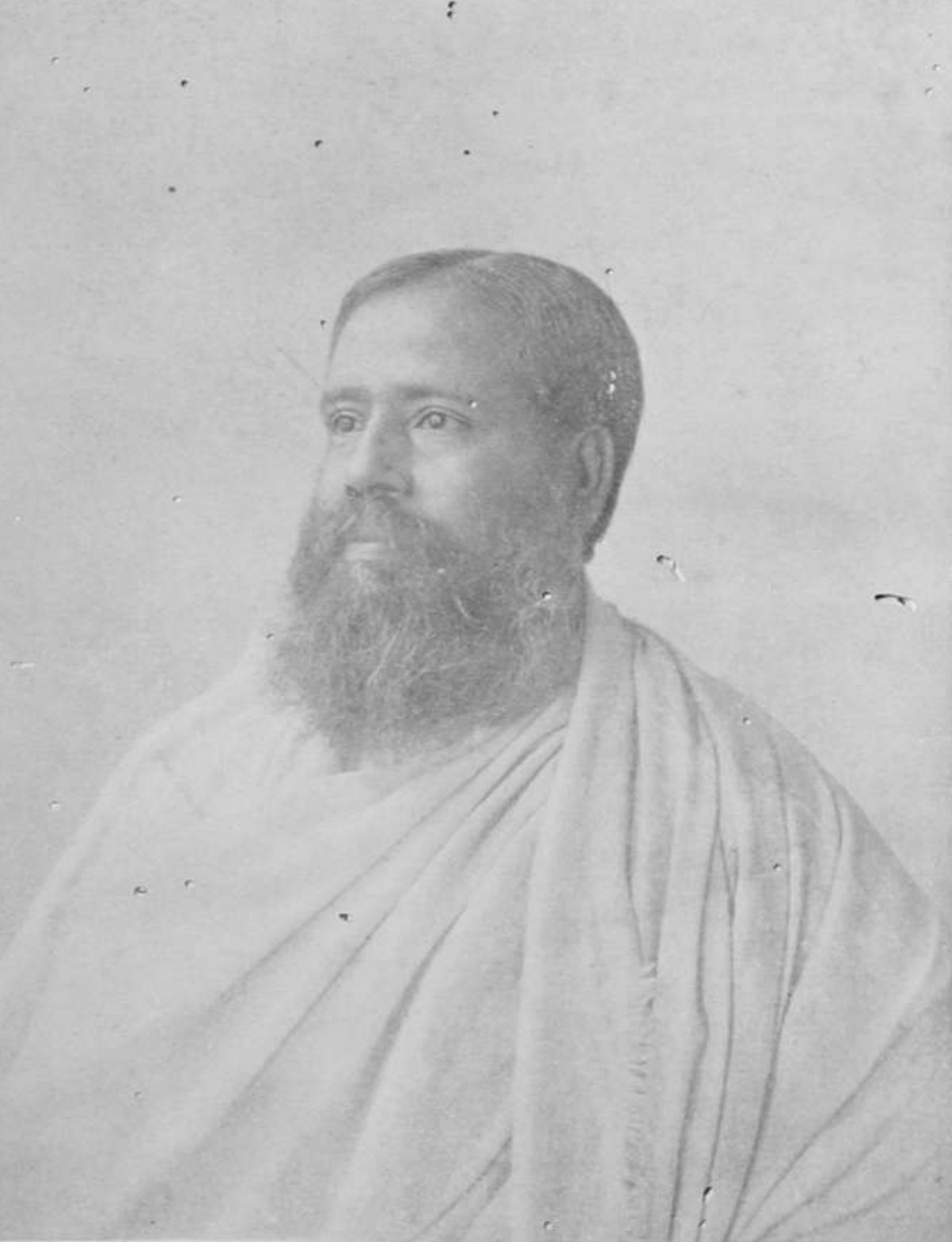
- Portrait of Ray, from Calcutta Review (1925).
- Born: 26 May 1858; Kishorganj, Bengal, British India
- Died: 30 October 1925 (aged 67); Calcutta, Bengal, British India
- Occupations: Mathematician, academic, cricketer
- Relatives: Upendrakishore Ray Chowdhury (brother)

Saradaranjan Ray (26 May 1858 – 30 October 1925) was a Bengali teacher of mathematics and Sanskrit who worked at Aligarh University and at Calcutta. He was also a cricket enthusiast and promoter who has been called the "W.G. Grace of India" and as the father of cricket in Bengal. He founded "The Town Club", a cricket club in Calcutta that played against European teams in the Eden Gardens from 1895. He was the elder brother of Upendrakishore Ray Chowdhury and hence a paternal great-uncle of Satyajit Ray.

== Life ==
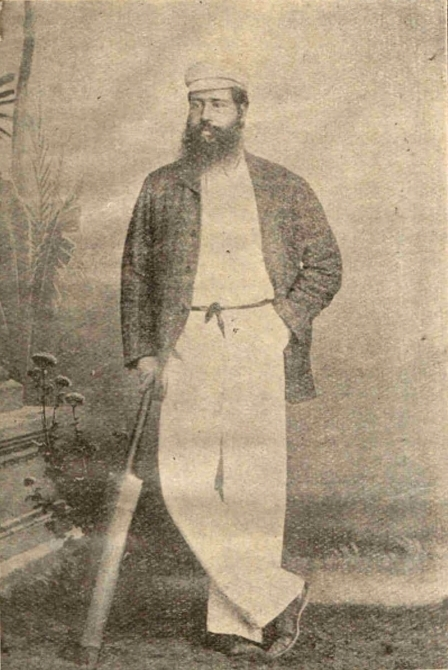

Saradaranjan was one of five siblings born to Kalinath and Joytara who came from a wealthy Kishoreganj family. Kalinath (d. 1879), also called Shyamsundar Munshi, knew Persian, Arabic, and Sanskrit, and served as an assistant to the deputy magistrate of Mymensingh. Saradaranjan was educated in Dhaka, where he took an interest in cricket and along with his brothers, Kamadaranjan (Upendrakishore), Muktidaranjan, Kuladaranjan and Pramodaranjan, founded the Dhaka College Cricket Club. He obtained a BA in 1878. He then obtained an MA from Calcutta in 1879 and joined the Aligarh Anglo-Oriental College as a mathematics teacher. He also taught Sanskrit.

Ray was known to be physically violent and temperamental. On one occasion his son brought home a goat that disturbed him with its bleating causing him to beat the goat to death. On another occasion, an English soldier in a train annoyed him by putting his leg up on the seat next to him. After the man refused to heed his requests, he reportedly grabbed the man and pulled him onto the floor.

Ray moved from Aligarh to Berhampore with a teaching job and then went to Dhaka College for a brief stint before moving to Cuttack. He was then invited by Ishwarchandra Vidyasagar to join the Metropolitan Institution which he joined in 1888, becoming its vice principal in 1892 and principal from 1909 until his death. Footballer Gostha Pal was encouraged by Ray in cricket.

== Publishing and sports goods ==
After the death of Vidyasagar in 1891, the Metropolitan Institution ran into financial difficulties and Ray did not have a salary. He sought incomes from writing books, mainly commentaries in English on various Sanskrit works. He also conducted tutorials from 1895 charging 100 to 200 rupees per week. He established a printing and sports goods company, S. Ray and Company in 1898 along with his brother-in-law and renowned entrepreneur Hemendra Mohan Bose through which he published the first cricket manual in Bengali in 1899. The company was quite well known in the period and He designed a cricket bat that won a medal in the Indian Industrial and Agricultural Exhibition at Calcutta in 1906. He took a keen interest in fishing, designing baitless hooks and other gear which he sold through his company. Apart from cricket, he also took an interest in football, serving as the first president for the East Bengal Football Club.
