= August Hjalmar Edgren =

American linguist

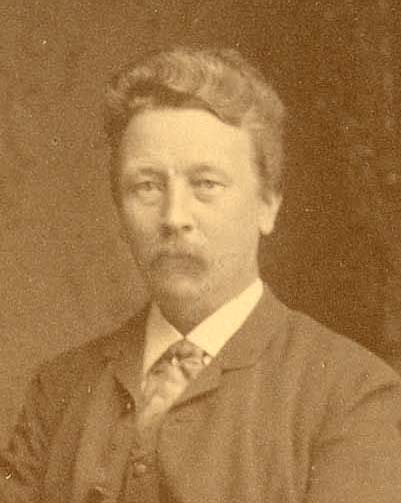
August Hjalmar Edgren, c. 1885

August Hjalmar Edgren (October 18, 1840 – December 9, 1903) was a Swedish-American linguist, professor, and author.

== Background ==
August Hjalmar Edgren was born in Östanås, Älvsbacka parish in Värmland, Sweden. He was the son of Axel Edgren (1813–1864) and Mathilda Berger (1817–1878). He was educated in Karlstad and Stockholm. He was a graduate of the University of Uppsala and the royal military school of Sweden. Edgren passed the officer's exam in Stockholm in 1860, and subsequently served during the American Civil War in the Union Army, where he entered the 99th New York Regiment as 2d lieutenant in January 1862. He was promoted to 1st lieutenant, and in August 1863 he was assigned to the engineer corps. He resigned towards the end of 1863, went back to Sweden and took commission in the Värmland Regiment, in which he served from February 1864 until August 1870, having been adjutant from July 1869. In the beginning of the 1870s Edgren returned to the United States, where he studied at Cornell University and Yale University.

== Career ==
Hjalmar Edgren divided his professional career between Sweden and the United States. He was a teacher of languages in Riverview Academy in 1871/2, instructor in French, German, and Sanskrit in Yale from 1874 until 1880, and lecturer in Sanskrit in the University of Lund, Sweden, from 1880 until 1884, when he became professor of modern languages and Sanskrit at the University of Nebraska. Edgren served as the Rector of the University of Gothenburg from 1891 to 1893.

== Works ==
Edgren wrote numerous books, including a report of the author's travels in Mexico. He also authored books of grammar in German, French, Italian, Spanish and Sanskrit. Among his publications are a German and English Dictionary, with Prof. W. D. Whitney (New York and London, 1877); and works in Swedish on The Literature of America (Göteborg, 1878), The Public Schools and Colleges of the United States (Upsala, 1879), Swedish Literature in America (Sweden, 1883) and American Antiquities (1885).

Other works include:

- Kalidasa, Schakuntala eller den förlorade ringen (1875) Swedish
- Ur Amerikas skönliteratur. Teckningar och öfversättningar (1878) Swedish
- On the verbal roots of the Sanskrit language and of the Sanskrit grammarians (1879)
- The kindred Germanic words of German and English (1880)
- Sanskritspråkets formlära (1883) Swedish
- Dikter i original och översättning (1884) Swedish
- A compendious Sanskrit grammar (1885)
- A compendious French Grammar (1890)
- An Elementary Spanish Grammar (1891)
- Supplementary exercises for Edgren's French Grammar (1893)
- A brief Italian grammar; with exercises' (1897)
- Sommarferier I Montezumas Land (1898) Swedish
- Topical digest of the Rig-Veda (1899)
- An Italian and English dictionary with pronunciation and brief etymologies (1901)
- A French and English dictionary, with indications of pronunciation, etymologies, and dates of earliest appearance of French words in the language (1901)

== Other sources ==
- Benson, Adolph B & Naboth Hedin Swedes in America 1638-1938 (New Haven, 1938)
- Lindquist, Emory: An Immigrant's Two Worlds, a Biography of Hjalmar Edgren (Rock Island, Illinois: Augustana Historical Society. 1972)
