= Madhyamavyayoga =

Sanskrit play attributed to Bhāsa

Madhyamavyayoga (Sanskrit: मध्यमव्यायोग, romanized: Madhyamavyāyoga, lit. 'The middle one') is a Sanskrit play attributed to Bhāsa, a famous Sanskrit poet. There is no consensus regarding when the play was written, and it has been dated variously from 475 BCE to the 11th century CE. The Sanskrit poet Nannaya, who lived around 400 CE, has mentioned Bhasa in his works, and this suggests Bhasa may have lived around 350 CE. However, many scholars disagree, and opine that Bhasa lived around the 7th to 8th centuries CE, placing the play's creation within the same time period. Madhyama Vyayoga focuses on the name confusion between the priest Keshav Das's middle son and the middle Pandava prince Bhima. Also, the reunion of Bhima and Ghatotkacha as father and son take place. While the characters in this tale are taken from the Mahabharata, this particular incidence is solely a product of Bhasa. Madhyamavyayoga falls under a particular type of Sanskrit drama called Vyayoga.

== Etymology ==
The play's title is derived from two of its main characters, and from the type of the dramatic composition. In classical Sanskrit dramaturgy the vyāyoga was a one-act play with the heroic mood, lacking romantic element and few feminine roles. Madhyama refers to the middle one and in this case, the middle sibling.The confusion caused by addressing both the son of the priest Keshava Dasa and the Pandava prince Bhimasena as madhyama is a central feature of the play.

== Synopsis ==
The play takes place in the same forest in which the Pandava brothers are spending their exile, and commences with a Brahmin family of a mother, father, and their three sons being pursued by Ghatotkacha, son of the demoness Hidimbā and the second Pandava prince, Bhima. Ghatotkacha, however, is only doing his mother's bidding, for she has asked him to find some human for her to have as a meal. Upon capturing the Brahmin family, Ghatotkacha states that he will release the family, as long as one individual becomes Hidimbā's dinner. In acts of selflessness, each person in the family strives to be taken by Ghatotkacha in order to save the rest of the family. The priest (the father) states that he will go to preserve his family. The mother protests that her husband means everything to her and that she has served her purpose as a mother so she must go. Both the first and second son argue that it is they instead that must save the family. Upon painfully discussing who will have to give their life to spare the other members of the family, the father confesses that the first son is his favorite, and the mother admits that the youngest is hers, leaving the middle son to be taken by Hidimbā. Before facing his fate, the middle son first asks permission to first quench his thirst at a nearby lake.

After the priests' middle son has gone for some time, Ghatotkacha worries that his mother's dinner time will soon pass, and he demands that the family give him the name of the middle son so that he may call him. The first son gives Ghatotkacha the name madhyama, which literally means, “Middle one,” which, coincidentally, is also the title of Bhima, as he is the middle of the first three Pandava brothers. As a result, Bhima believes that it is he that is being called, enters the scene, and takes charge of the situation, telling the priest that he is free to go and that he will take his place as Hidimbā's meal if necessary.

In arguing, both Ghatotkacha and Bhima notice that the other is rather proud; curious, Bhima inquires the identity of Ghatotkach's mother, only to find that he is indeed his son. Bhima does not, however, say this right away. Instead they wrestle and argue longer, possibly for Bhima's own amusement. Finally, Bhima defeats Ghatotkacha and lets the family to leave, but in despair Ghatotkacha reminds Bhima of his promise that he will go in place of the priest's middle son. Bhima allows Ghatotkacha to call his mother, who, upon entering the scene, immediately reveals the identity of Bhima to their son. Shocked and humbled by the sudden revelation, Ghatotkacha repents for his ignorance. Hidimbā claims that her appetite is indeed satisfied by the return of her husband, and both families go their separate ways on good terms.

== Adaptations ==
Madhyamavyayoga was performed by the drama troupe of Alva's Education Foundation. It was directed by noted director Jeevan Ram Sullia. The Alva Education Foundation won the state level ‘Ranga Thorana’ award at the Natakotsav held at Raghavendra (sic – this should be Raghava) Kala Mandir, Bellary. The same play had been staged at different parts of India (Kolkata, Kurukshetra, Madurai, Kozhikode, Varanasi and all over Karnataka state).

Madhyamavyayoga was also performed by the 2nd year students of the National School of Drama in Delhi. It was directed by Anjala Mahirishi and performed in November 2002. National School of Drama (NSD) is India's premier theatre training institute situated at New Delhi, India. The play is done by Sarga Kalakshetra Kavalam a school started under the guidance of Padmabhushan Kavalam Narayana Panicker. The play is directed by his disciple Satish Kumar Kavalam.

== Translations to English ==
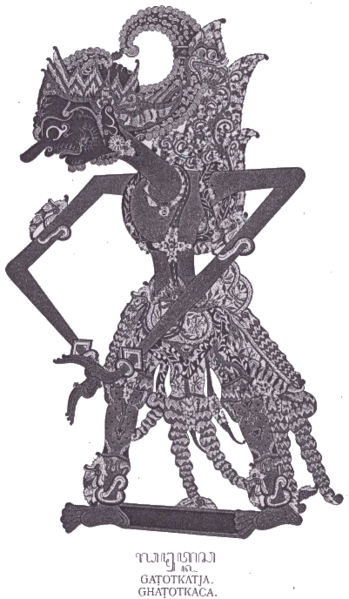
Ghatotkacha as seen in Javanese shadow puppet play

The play has been translated into English a handful of times. The majority of the texts below include English introductions and notes.

- Janvier, E. P. (1922). The Madhyama Vyayoga; a drama composed by the poet Bhasa. Mysore: Wesleyan Mission Press.
- Devadhar, C. (1957). Madhyamavyayoga; a Sanskrit drama, a one act play attributed to Bhasa. Poona: Oriental Book Agency.
- Swarup, L., & Woolner, A. C. (1991). Thirteen Plays of Bhasa. Delhi: Motilal Banarsidass.
- Haskar, A. (1993). The Shattered Thigh and Other Mahabharata Plays of Bhasa. New Delhi: Penguin Books India.
- Bhattacharjee, S. (1999). Madhyama-Vyayoga: a Sanskrit one-act play attributed to Bhasa. Mumbai: Bharatiya Vidya Bhavan.
- Sharma, S. K. (2005). Karṇabhāram and Madhyama-vyāyoga. Delhi: Parimal Publications.

== Studies ==
- Salomon, Richard (2010) "Like Father, Like Son: Poetic Strategies in "The Middle Brother" (Madhyama-vyāyoga) Attributed to Bhāsa." Indo-Iranian Journal (IIJ), Volume 53, Number 1, pp. 1–22.
- Tieken, Hermann. (information pending)
- Panikkar, K. (2004, September 3). Notes on Bhasa's Play Madhyama Vyayoga.
- Sastri, T. G. (1917). The Madhyamavyayoga of Bhasa with the commentary of Pandit T. Ganapati Sastri. Trivandrum: Sridhara Printing House.

== Translations to Other Languages ==
- Rai, G. S. (1997). Madhyamavyāyogah̤ : "Gaṅgā"-Saṃskr̥ta-Hindīvyākhyopetam. Varanasi: Caukhambhā Saṃskr̥ta Saṃsthāna. (Hindi)
- Simha, H. (2003). Bhāsa ke tīna nāṭaka : Karṇabhāra, Dūtavākya aura Madhyamavyāyoga. Prayag (Allahabad): Hindī Sāhitya Sammelana. (Hindi)
- Upadhyay, C., & Upadhyay, A. K. (2001). Bhāsa ke nāṭaka : samīkṣātmaka bhūmikā, mūla tathā Hindī anuvāda ke sātha. Delhi: Naga Publishers. (Hindi)

== See also ==
- Bhasa
- Bhima
- Ghatotkacha
- Mahabharata
- Mattavilasa
- Raksasa
- Sanskrit drama
- Sanskrit literature
- Urubhanga
