= Bhaṭṭanārāyaṇa =

Sanskrit scholar and writer

Bhaṭṭa Nārāyaṇa Mṛgarājalakṣmana, also known as Nishānārāyana, was a Sanskrit scholar and writer who belonged to the Pancharatra Rarhi branch of Sandilya family of Kanyakubja Brahmins. He is believed to have been summoned from Kanyakubja (Kannauj) to Bengal by King Ādisūra, who ruled after the Pala dynasty came to power in the middle of the eleventh century.

Bhaṭṭa Nārāyaṇa was a disciple of Dharmakirti with whom he co-authored Rupavatara. Dandin in his Avantisundarikatha refers to Bhaṭṭa Nārāyaṇa as author of three books but who is more widely known as the author of Venisamhara that dramatizes in six acts some incidents from the Mahabharata. The construction of this drama may be bad but characterization is vigorous; many violent situations are described in long narrative digressions in poetic but undramatic style, yet there are graces of poetry, power of crude and furious descriptions, of impressive sonorous diction, of vivid depiction of detached scenes and situations, and of vigorous characterization. The Bagchi family of BagchiJamsherpur District Nadia postal code 741122 owes its origin from BhattaNarayana, the name of this Sanskrit poet figures in their family chronicle which was last updated in 1975 and copies of the printed book are available with some of the families. The chronicle also mentions names of 16 sons of BhattaNarayana and provides details of his descendants up to 1975. The Tagore family, Nadia Raj and the Jaygopal Tarkalankar family claim their descent from Bhaṭṭa Nārāyaṇa.

Here is the 15 decestor taken from 'Barendra Brahmin Bibaran' book by Sri Nagenchandra Bose Vidyabaridhi.

Shandilya Gotra Bhattanarayan

          ↓

Aadi Ganyi Ojha

          ↓

Jaymaan Bhatta

          ↓
     Harikuj
          ↓
   Vidyapati
          ↓
   Raghupati
          ↓
 Shivacharya
          ↓
 Somacharya
          ↓
   Ugramani
          ↓
   Tapomani
          ↓
Sindhusagar
          ↓
 Bindusagar
          ↓
  Jayasagar 
          ↓
   Pitambar
          ↓

1) Sadhu Bagchi, 2) Rudra Bagchi, 3) Lokenath Laheri, are the son of Pitambar. Aadiganyi Ojha is the son of Bhattanarayan.

== See also ==
- List of Sanskrit plays in English translation
