= A. C. Woolner =

20th-century vice-chancellor of the University of the Punjab

Alfred Cooper Woolner
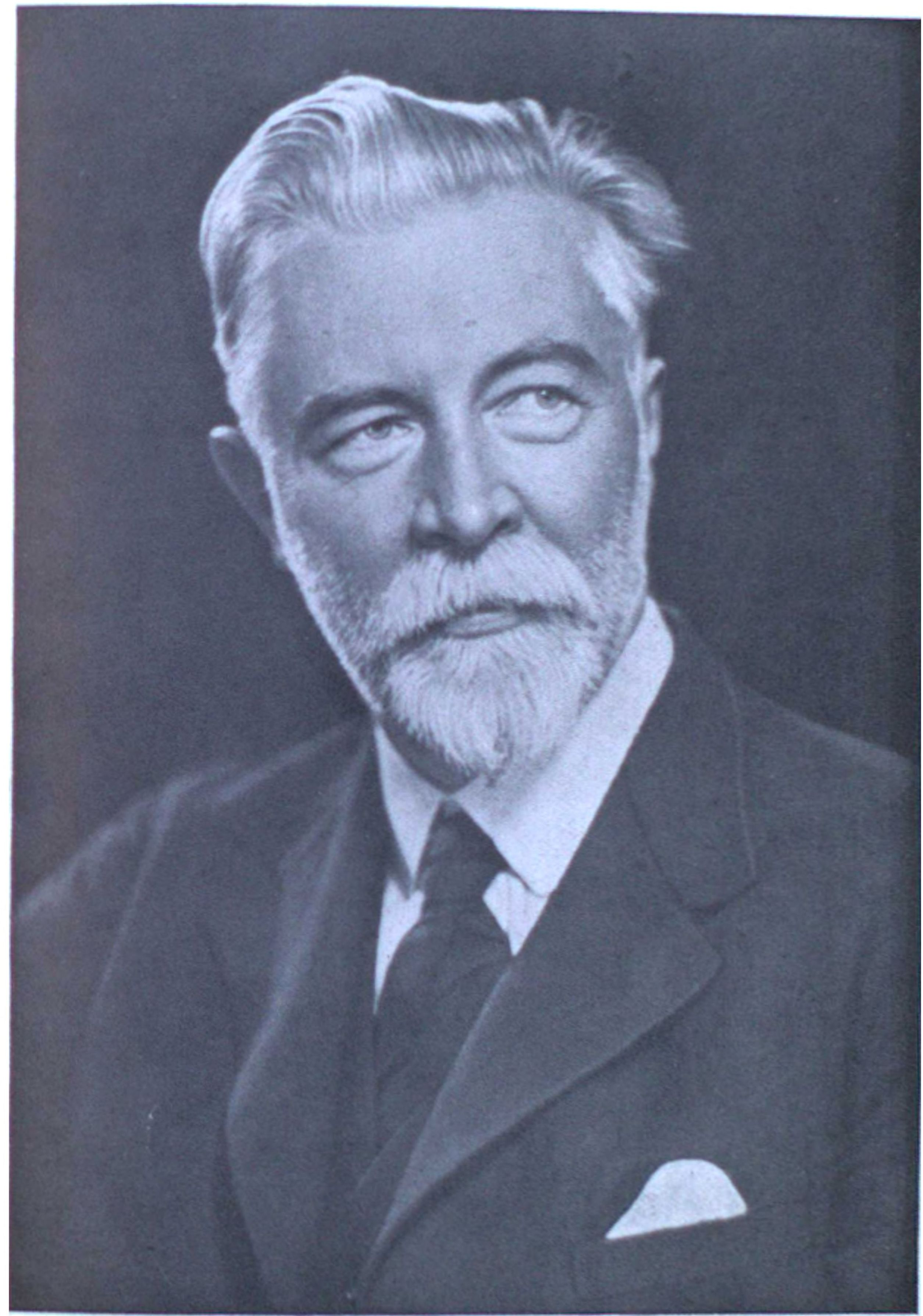
- A. C. Woolner
- Born: 13 May 1878; Etruria Hall, Staffordshire, England
- Died: 7 January 1936 (aged 57); Lahore

Academic work
- Main interests: Sanskrit, Prakrit

Alfred Cooper Woolner (13 May 1878 – 7 January 1936) was a British scholar and professor of Sanskrit. He served as the vice-chancellor of the University of the Punjab, Lahore from 1928 to 1936.

== Biography ==
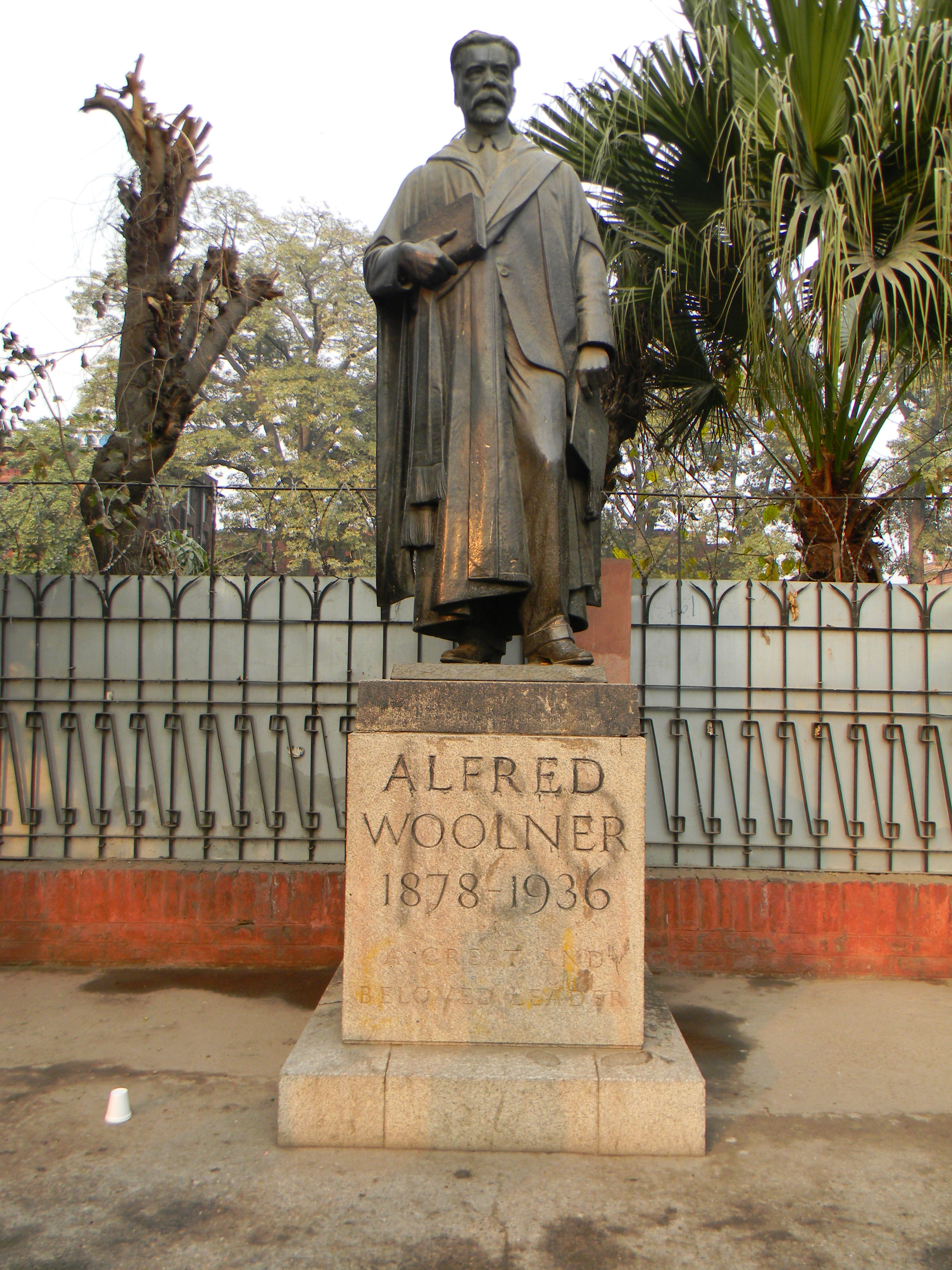
Woolner's statue outside Punjab University in Lahore

Woolner was born on 13 May 1878 at Etruria Hall in Staffordshire, England.

Woolner was educated at Ipswich School and Trinity College, Oxford. In 1903, at the age of twenty-five Woolner he joined the University of the Punjab as its Registrar and Principal of its Oriental College. From 1928 until 1936 he served as Vice Chancellor.

On 17 December 1935, Woolner contracted malaria which, after a week, developed into pneumonia. He was moved to Mayo Hospital, Lahore where he died in the morning of 7 January 1936. He was buried in the city's Gora Kabristan on Jail Road. He was survived by his wife Mary Emily Woolner. On his wife's death in 1944 she bequeathed the majority of her estate to the University of the Punjab. Punjab University Library's collection of over 8,500 Ancient Sanskrit and Hindi manuscripts is named in his honour. The only remaining intact statue from the British Raj era in Lahore is that of Dr. Woolner which stands in front of the Pharmacy Department of Punjab University.

== Works ==
- AC Woolner was the Founder President of Indian Library Association - ILA ( established in 1933).
- Introduction to Prakrit
