= Vina-Vasavadatta =

Indian Sanskrit-language play attributed to Shudraka

- Original language: Sanskrit
- Written by: Shudraka
- Characters: Vasavadatta; Udyana; Pradyota; Yaugandharayana; Vasantaka; Bharatarohaka; Sankrityayani
- Genre: Sanskrit drama
- Setting: Ujjayini

Vina-Vasavadatta (IAST: Vīṇā-Vāsavadattā) is an Indian Sanskrit-language play attributed to Shudraka (c. 3rd century). The first eight acts of the play survive; its last portion is now lost.

The title of the play refers to its heroine Vasavadatta and the musical instrument vina. In the play, Vasavadatta's father, king Pradyota of Avanti, searches for a suitable husband for his daughter. Based on interpretation of a dream, Pradyota and his ministers determine that king Udayana of Vatsa is a suitable match, but is too proud to willingly accept a proposal to marry to the princess. To break his pride, Pradyota arranges for Udayana to be captured and imprisoned in Ujjayini, the capital of Avanti. There, Udayana falls in love with Vasavadatta, and meets her on the pretext of giving her vina lessons. With the help of his aides, Udayana plans to escape with the princess. The rest of the plot, which is not available in the extant acts, probably described Udayana's escape and subsequent events.

== Background ==
The first eight acts of the play have been recovered from manuscripts preserved in Kerala. The last portion of the play, which included one or two acts, is now lost.

The title of the play refers to a scene in which the heroine Vasavadatta receives a vina lesson from the hero Udayana. The Vina-Vasavadatta is a new drama on a previously-staged story, which is same as that of Bhasa's Pratijna-Yaugandharayana; the heroine also appears in Bhasa's Svapna-Vasavadatta (the sequel to Pratijna-Yaugandharayana). Despite the common story, the two plays are very different: Bhasa's play is a short play in which Udayana and Vasavadatta do not appear on the stage, and many incidents are presented as reports rather than enacted scenes; on the other hand, Shudraka's play is a full-fledged play.

Vatsa-raja-charita is probably another name for Vina-Vasavadatta.

== Plot ==
Act 1

King Pradyota (alias Mahasena) of Avanti is anxious to get his daughter Vasavadatta married to a suitable man. The god Shiva has told him in a dream that his daughter will be married to an ideal husband, but against the will (it is not mentioned whose will). He consults with his ministers to find a suitable match, but dismisses all potential matches as unworthy because of their greed, foolishness, cruelty, or other negative qualities. Pradyota's minister Vasuvarman suggests that king Udayana of Vatsa is Shiva's choice, but Pradyota opposes the suggestion, stating that Udayana is too proud. After further discussion, the assembly interprets Shiva's words "against the will" to mean that Udayana must be married to Vasavadatta against Udayana's will. The prime minister Bharatarohaka suggests that capturing Udayana would break his pride. Bharatarohaka mentions that as a boy, Udayana and his friends threw dust at a rishi (sage) while pretending to be elephants. The rishi cursed Udayana to be subjugated by an enemy through an elephant.

Act 2

Pradyota's spies gather information about Udayana's forces and movements. Pradyota's minister Shalankayana has deployed an army near the Yamuna River, accompanied by an elephant painted blue. Meanwhile, Udayana deploys his forces in an elephant forest to capture a herd of elephants. An agent of Pradyota, disguised as a forest-dweller, reports seeing a blue elephant at some distance. Intrigued, Udayana leaves behind his army to see the blue elephant, accompanied by only his personal attendants and 20 soldiers. When he sees the elephant, Udayana plays a vina named Ghoshavati to tame the elephant. Soon, he is attacked by Pradyota's soldiers, and realizes that he has been deceived.

Act 3

Udayana's minister Yaugandharayana receives a letter from the nun Sankrityayani, his secret agent in Pradyota's capital Ujjayini. The letter warns him of the blue elephant plan to capture Udayana, but has been delayed because of the roadblocks set up by Pradyota's soldiers. Soon after, Hamsaka, a soldiers who has escaped from the forest attack, brings the news that Udayana has been captured. Yaugandharayana immediately starts preparing for the king's rescue. To convince Pradyota's agents that no action is being taken to rescue the king, he spreads the news that he has received the report of Udayana's death, and then fakes his own death. He then reveals to the audience that he intends to go to Ujjayini disguised as an ascetic to bring his master.

Act 4

In the introductory scene to Act 4, Udayana's loyalists are seen in disguise in Ujjayini, in a variation of the scenes in Act 3 of Bhasa's Pratijna-Yaugandharayana. Udayana's jester (vidushaka) Vasantaka has managed to enter the palace of king Pradyota with his amusing acts, and has been able to meet Udayana in prison. Meanwhile, Hamsaka reports that king Aruni has captured Udayana's capital Kaushambi after defeating his forces in a battle: Udayana's brothers have been killed in the battle, but his minister Rumanvant is holding the fortress of Lavanaka and has secret agents in several villages. Hamsaka then reveals Yaugandharayana's plan to rescue Udayana: an elephant named Nalagiri has been excited. When Udayana is asked to pacify this elephant, he would mount the elephant and escape, supported by 500 loyal soldiers hiding in Ujjayini.

In Act 4 proper, Pradyota receives Shalankayana as a hero who has just recovered from the battle injuries. Pradyota and his ministers discuss Udayana's qualities, and decide to release him, believing that he has suffered enough. On Shalankayana's advice, 10,000 soldiers are deployed in Ujjayini to prevent Udayana from escaping. Pradyota then orders Udayana to be released and taken to calm down the elephant Nalagiri. Udayana is given the vina Ghoshavati that was seized during the forest fight. The wild elephant is brought in front of the Disha-mukhi palace, and the prime minister Bharatarohaka brings Udayana to the site. Pradyota, his queen, and his daughter Vasavadatta watch the scene from the balcony of the palace. Udayana calms down the elephant with his vina, and hands over the vina to Bharatarohaka, and then mounts the elephant. Vasavadatta is impressed by his feat, as is Pradyota, who asks Bharatarohaka to treat Udayana like his own sons. Udayana likes Vasavadatta, and decides that he will leave Ujjayini only with her. When Yaugandharayana comes to rescue him, he refuses to escape, and instead goes to Pradyota's palace with Bharatarohaka.

Act 5

In the introductory scene to Act 5, a conversation between Vasavadatta's confidante Kanchana-mala and a maid reveals that the princess is not well. The maid tells Kanchana-mala that the nun Sankrityayani can become possessed by a goddess and reveal how to cure Vasavadatta. In Act 5 proper, at a temple, Sankrityayani reveals in a monologue that Udayana and Vasavadatta have fallen in love, and the princess is not well simply because she is longing for Udayana. Then, Sankrityayani pretends to be a priestess possessed by a goddess, and tells Vasavadatta that her desire for Udayana will be fulfilled. After Vasavadatta departs, her parents parents enter the temple with Bharatarohaka. Sankrityayani tells them that Vasavadatta is longing for Udayana, and Pradyota infers that he has been given a divine command to allow Pradyota to enter Vasavadatta's palace. Bharatarohaka suggests that in eyes of the public, Udayana can be allowed to enter the palace on the pretext of giving the princess music lessons.

Act 6

Udayana has been freed by Pradyota, but still remains in Ujjayini because of his love for Vasavadatta. Not knowing that Vasantaka was originally Udayana's jester, Pradyota sends him to Udayana disguised as a crazy beggar named Mattavilasa. Pradyota tells Udayana that Mattavilasa will amuse him, but his actual mission is to keep an eye on Udayana. Vasantaka first teases Udayana that he is thinking of a drama featuring characters based on himself, Udayana and Vasavadatta. After talking about this drama, he tells Udayana that Aruni has sent an envoy to Pradyota, stressing the need to keep a close watch on Udayana. He further states that after hearing what the envoy had to say, Pradyota only smiled to Bharatarohaka. Soon, Bharatarohaka arrives and takes Udayana to Vasavadatta's palace in a chariot.

Act 7

Udayana teaches Vasavadatta music, in the presence of Sankrityayani, Kanchanamala, Vasantaka (disguised as Mattavilasa), and a chamberlain carrying the vina. Udayana plays vina and sings several songs, including a verse on the Vamana incarnation of Vishnu, and another expressing his increasing love for Vasavadatta. Sankrityayani then asks Vasavadatta to play the vina as demonstrated by Udayana, and Udayana calls Vasavadatta a good student. To keep Udayana longer in the palace, Sankrityayani suggests that "Mattavilasa" dance to entertain them. Vasavadatta doesn't watch the performance, but still rewards him a ring, which Udayana takes. Udayana is still a proud man: he intends to abduct Vasavadatta, and doesn't want Pradyota to know that he is in love with the princess. He tells Vasantaka that he will pretend to be in be in love with another woman to avoid raising Pradyota's suspicions. On Vasantaka's suggestion, he sends a gift to a prostitute named Narmada. Vasantaka, who is pretending to be Pradyota's spy as Mattavilasa, spreads the rumour about Udayana's supposed affair with Narmada.

Act 8

A maid tells Vasavadatta about the Udayana's supposed love for Narmada. According to the rumor, Narmada rejected Udayana's advances despite Pradyota's approval. Vasavadatta is angry and disappointed, but Kanchanamala reassures her that Udayana would not love a woman like Narmada, and asks her to consult Sankrityayani. Sankrityayani meets them in the garden, presents a letter from Udayana to Vasavadatta, and states that Udayana's supposed love for Narmada must have been a sham. Sankrityayani also reveals that Udayana had once saved her from drowning in a lake beside the Yamuna river. Vasavadatta sings the verses written by Udayana with a vina, and then prepares to receive him for a music lesson. Sankrityayani says that Udayana will be delighted when he hears about Vasavadatta's feelings for him.

Lost portions

The missing portions of the play probably included one or two acts. These acts most probably described Udayana's escape with Vasavadatta, and the re-establishment of his control over Kaushambi, among other events. Sankrityayani also probably leaves Ujjayini with Vasavadatta: in some later works (such as Matraraja's Tapasa-Vatsaraja), she appears in subsequent adventures of Udayana.

The Tamil language version of the Brihatkatha (a lost work) contains a story about Udayana, with a plot very similar to that of Vina-Vasavadatta. Notably, this story features the characters Sankrityayani and Narmada, which do not appear in other extant versions of the Udayana-Vasavadatta story. In this story, Yaugandharayana uses a fake oracle to organize a water festival on the outskirts of Ujjayini. While Pradyota's court is occupied with the festival, he causes confusion by starting a fire in the city, and facilitates the escape of Udayana and Vasavadatta. It is possible that this plotline appeared in the original Brihatkatha, and served as the source for the Vina-Vasavadatta.
