= Vasavadatta =

Classical Sanskrit romantic tale

Vasavadatta is also a character in the Svapnavasavadatta and the Vina-Vasavadatta

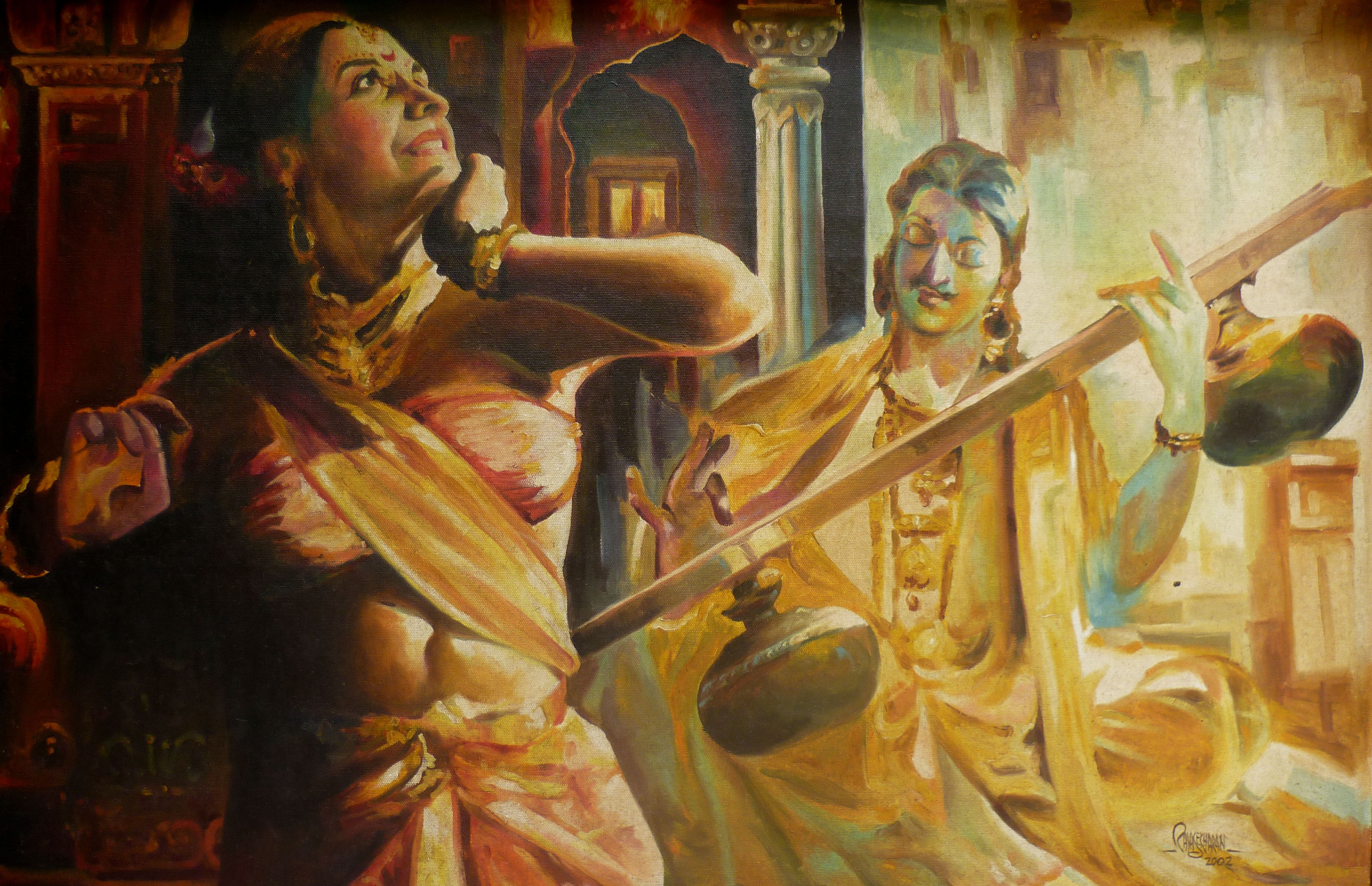
Vasavadhata - oil painting by Rajasekharan Parameswaran.

Vasavadatta (Sanskrit: वासवदत्ता, Vāsavadattā) is a classical Sanskrit romantic tale (akhyayika) written in an ornate style by Subandhu, whose time period isn't precisely known. He is generally taken to have written the work in the second quarter of the seventh century. However, scholar Maan Singh has stated that he was a courtier of the Gupta emperors Kumaragupta I (414-455) and Skandagupta (455-467), dating him between 385 and 465 AD.

The work's style has been described as "developed, elaborate, ornate and pedantic" and has influenced later prose writers. The Kanchanadarpana of Sivarama Tripathin (18th century) and the Tattvadipini of Jagaddhara are two significant works of criticism and commentary on the Vasavadatta.

Vasavadatta is one of the earliest known texts that mention Chaturanga, the earliest known precursor to Chess.

Louis Herbert Gray first translated Vasavadatta into English, which was published by the Columbia University Press in 1913 as the eighth volume of the 13 volume Columbia University Indo-Iranian Series in between 1901–32 and edited by A. V. Williams Jackson. Harinath De completed an English translation in 1908, but it was not published until 1994 (Sanskrit College, Calcutta).

== Plot outline ==
The outline of the plot of this work is as follows:

Kandarpaketu, son of king Chintamani, is a handsome and charming prince. In his dreams, he once has a vision of a lovely maiden whose sheer beauty bewitches him. He resolves to set out in search of this beauty. His friend Makaranda remonstrates with him, saying that setting out into the wilderness with no idea of one's goal is foolishness. Kandarpaketu tells him of his conviction that this girl has been his companion of many lifetimes and that they are certainly destined to be united in this lifetime and every future lifetime too. Let them set out, and fate will surely direct their steps in the right direction.

Rather than let his friend depart alone, Makaranda accompanies him in his quest, and they leave the capital in search of this unknown beauty. Soon enough, they meet with success. The two friends lie down to rest in the shade of a tree on the banks of the Narmada river. Here, the prince overhears a conversation between a pair of love-birds perched on the tree above them. The male bird is extolling the charms and virtues of Vasavadatta, daughter of king Shringarashekhara of Kusumapura. The bird reveals further that this princess had, in her dreams, had a vision of a charming prince who had smitten her heart. The princess had vividly described the young man to her companion and confidante, Tamalika, and had despaired of ever meeting with him in real life, for her destiny seemed to take her another way. The bird had overheard the description of the prince and, being a love-bird, had resolved to fly out over the country, locate the young man, and bring him to the princess.

To cut the story short, the bird leads Kandarpaketu to Tamalika and the group proceeds to Kusumapura where Tamalika arranges for Kandarpaketu to meet Vasavadatta. They meet and duly recognize each other from their respective dreams in a lyrical passage. However, Kandarpaketu learns to his horror that Vasavadatta's father, king Shringarshekhara, has arranged for her to wed Pushpaketu, son of Vijayaketu, chief of the Vidyadharas, the very next morning. Kandarpaketu and Vasavadatta flee to the Vindhya mountains forthwith, mounted upon a magic steed, leaving Makaranda behind at Kusumapura.

After reaching safety in the Vindhya mountains, the exhausted lovers fell asleep. When Kandarpaketu wakes up, he finds Vasavadatta missing. He searches for her in vain and then, mad with grief, decides to end his life. When he is on the verge of committing suicide by drowning, a voice from the sky rings out and promises him that he will be re-united with Vasavadatta. Kandarpaketu wanders for several months in the forest, distraught and lovelorn. He finally chances upon a stone image of Vasavadatta. He touches the image, and miraculously, the stone turns into a living and breathing Vasavadatta.

After regaining life, Vasavadatta narrates to Kandarpaketu the series of events that befell her after they both fell asleep in the forests of the Vindhya mountains. She awoke hungry and went in search of wild fruits to eat. She was then caught between two groups of soldiers, each led by a chieftain who fell in love with her at first sight and wished to possess her. While they were fighting with each other, she managed to escape. During her flight through the forest, she unintentionally trespassed into the hermitage of an ascetic and disturbed his penances. Again, Vasavadatta's beauty is the culprit; her mere presence has disturbed years of penance. The hermit curses Vasavadatta that her beauty be turned to stone, and that she return to vibrant life only upon receiving the touch of the man who is destined from previous births to be her husband; this husband of many births would control and absorb her siren-like vibes and thus allay the disasters that a loose, beautiful woman visits upon everything that she comes in contact with. By the curse of the hermit, Vasavadatta was petrified into stone.

The fact that Vasavadatta returned to life upon being touched by Kandarpaketu confirms that he has been her husband in former lifetimes and is destined to be her husband in this and future lifetimes as well. Her father, King Sringarasekhara, recognizes this and gives her hand in marriage to Kandarpaketu. The couple proceed to Kandarpaketu's paternal kingdom and live there happily ever after.

== See also ==
- Bitextual work
