= Ganapati Sastri =

Ganapati Sastri (Telugu: గణపతి శాస్త్రి) is one of the Indian names.

- Ayyala Somayajula Ganapati Sastri, better known as Kavyakanta.
- Charla Ganapati Sastri, Vedic scholar and translator.
- Pilaka Ganapati Sastri, poet, translator and editor.
- T. Ganapati Sastri was a Sanskrit scholar, editor of the Trivandrum Sanskrit Series, and discovered the plays of Bhasa.
- Vuppuluri Ganapathi Sastry, Vedic scholar and the author of Veda Sara Ratnavali.
