= George Foot Moore =

American historian of religion and minister (1851–1931)

- Born: October 15, 1851; West Chester, Pennsylvania, U.S.
- Died: May 16, 1931 (aged 79); Cambridge, Massachusetts, U.S.
- Occupations: historian of religion, author, Presbyterian minister
- Spouse: Mary Soper
- Children: 2 sons

Academic background
- Education: Yale College, Union Theological Seminary (New York), Marietta College

Academic work
- Discipline: Ancient Near Eastern studies
- Sub-discipline: Judaic history
- Institutions: Hopkins Grammar School; Lancaster (Ohio) High School; Putnam Presbyterian Church; Andover Theological Seminary; Harvard Divinity School

George Foot Moore (October 15, 1851 – May 16, 1931) was an American historian of religion, author, professor, and Presbyterian minister.

== Life ==
Moore was born in West Chester, Pennsylvania, the son of Rev. William Eves Moore and Harriet Foot Moore. He was educated at private schools, West Chester Academy and Wyer's School, entered Yale College as a junior in 1870, then graduated from Yale in 1872, as a Phi Beta Kappa and member of the Skull and Bones society. After teaching at Hopkins Grammar School from 1872 to 1873, he engaged in study and private teaching in Columbus, Ohio, 1873–74, then served as principal of Lancaster (Ohio) High School 1874-75. He studied theology in Columbus 1875-76 and graduated from Union Theological Seminary (New York) in 1877. He was ordained to the Presbyterian ministry at Columbus February 8, 1878, and became pastor of Putnam Presbyterian Church in Zanesville, Ohio, from 1878 to 1883. He Married Mary Soper, daughter of Albert Gallatin and Mary Ann (Chester) Hanford on April 25, 1878, in Chicago. They had two sons, William Eves, who died in infancy, and Albert Hanford.

In 1883 he was appointed to the chair of Hebrew at Andover Theological Seminary where he taught until 1902, serving as president of the seminary from 1899 to 1901 and lectured on the history of religion from 1893 to 1901. During his service to Andover, he received the degree of Doctor of Divinity in 1885 from Marietta College, Ohio, and 12 years later, from Yale University in 1897. In 1902, he became a professor at the Harvard Divinity School, where he was appointed Frothingham Professor of the History of Religion in 1905, and Cabot Fellow for three years beginning in 1906. During his service at Harvard he obtained a degree of Legum Doctor in 1903 from Western Reserve University. He was a member of Harvard faculty from 1902 until retirement in 1928 and a preacher to the University from 1900 to 1903.

Moore was a member of the Deutsche Morgenlandische Gesellschaft, American Philological Association, Archaeological Institute of America, Society of Biblical Literature, among others, In addition, he was a Fellow of the American Academy of Arts and Sciences, serving as its president from 1921 to 1924, and was a member of both the American Oriental Society and the American Philosophical Society. Besides contributing many articles on Biblical and Oriental subjects in learned journals, he wrote extensively for the "Encyclopaedia Biblica" and served as editor of the Harvard Theological Review. Among his books, History of Religions (1914, 1919) and Judaism (two volumes, 1927) stand out as especially praiseworthy.

Moore served as an interim pastor and preacher at Central Congregational Church in Providence, Rhode Island from 1888-1889. He also preached at the dedication of the new building in 1893, and at the 50th Anniversary of the congregation in 1902.

Mrs. Mary Soper Moore died April 16, 1924. Moore died 7 years later due to general arteriosclerosis and chronic myocarditis, in Cambridge, Massachusetts, May 16, 1931.

== Works ==
=== Books ===
- Moore, George Foot (1895). A Critical and Exegetical Commentary on Judges. International critical commentary on the Holy Scriptures of the Old and New Testaments. Vol. 7. Edinburgh: T & T Clark. ISBN 978-0-567-05004-5. OCLC 860107.
- ——— (1898). The Book of Judges: A New English Translation Printed in Colors Exhibiting the Composite Structure of the Book. Sacred Books of the Old and New Testaments, part 7.; Polychrome Bible. London; New York: J. Clark; Dodd, Mead, and Co. OCLC 3343798.
- ———; Harper, Robert Francis; Brown, Francis, eds. (1908). Old Testament and Semitic studies in Memory of William Rainey Harper. Chicago, IL: University of Chicago Press. OCLC 3220423.
- ——— (1911). The Covenanters of Damascus: a Hitherto Unknown Jewish Sect. Cambridge, Massachusetts. OCLC 12094453.
- ———; Lyon, David Gordon, eds. (1912). Studies in the History of Religions. New York: Macmillan. OCLC 2303663.
- ——— (1913). The Literature of the Old Testament. Home University Library of Modern Knowledge. Vol. 65. New York; London: H. Holt and Co.; Williams and Norgate. OCLC 9430863.
- ——— (1913). History of religions, Volume 1: China, Japan, Egypt, Babylonia, Assyria, India, Persia, Greece, Rome. The International Theological Library. Edinburgh: T & T Clark. OCLC 314138945.
- ——— (1914). Metempsychosis. Ingersoll Lecture, 1914. Cambridge, Massachusetts: Harvard University Press. OCLC 2490057.
- ——— (1923). The Birth and Growth of Religion: Being the Morse Lectures of 1922. Morse Lectures, 1922. New York: Charles Scribner's Sons. OCLC 322865.
- ———; Gray, Louis Herbert, eds. (1916). The Mythology of All Races. Marshall Jones Co. - a 13 volume series published between 1916 and 1923.
- History of Religions (Vol. I, 1913; Vol. II, 1919)
- ——— (1919). History of Religions, Volume 2: Judaism, Christianity, Mohammedanism. The International Theological Library. Edinburgh: T & T Clark. OCLC 174399216.
- ——— (1927). Judaism in the First Centuries of the Christian Era: the age of the tannaim. Cambridge, Massachusetts: Harvard University Press. ISBN 9780674487505. OCLC 377315. - original published in 3 vols between 1927 and 1930
- Editor (unfinished work), Albert Pike, Materials For The history of Freemasonry In France and Elsewhere on The Continent of Europe From 1718 To 1859, circa 1905, detached from "The New Age" magazine.
- ——— (2007). Christian Writers on Judaism: nineteen centuries of apologetics and polemics. Analecta Gorgiana. Vol. 7. Piscataway: Gorgias Press. ISBN 978-1-593-33864-0. OCLC 171130703. - reprint of journal article

=== Chapters ===
- ——— (1912). "The Theological School at Nisibis". In ———; Lyon, David Gordon (eds.). Studies in the History of Religions. New York: Macmillan. OCLC 2303663.

=== Articles ===
- ——— (1921). "Christian Writers on Judaism: nineteen centuries of apologetics and polemics". Harvard Theological Review. 14 (3): 197–254. doi:10.1017/S0017816000014474. S2CID 163273892.
- Moore, George Foot (1912). "Zoroastrianism". Harvard Theological Review. 5 (2): 180–226. doi:10.1017/S0017816000013456. JSTOR 1507426. S2CID 248817425.
