= Classical drama =

Classical drama may refer to:

- Theatre of ancient Greece
- Theatre of ancient Rome
- Indian classical drama
