= Shanta Gandhi =

Indian dancer and theatre director

- Born: 20 December 1917; Nashik
- Died: 6 May 2002 (aged 84); Mumbai
- Occupations: Dancer, theatre director, playwright
- Known for: Jasma Odan (play)
- Spouse: Victor Kiernan (m. 1938; div. 1946)
- Relatives: Dina Pathak (sister)

Shanta Kalidas Gandhi (20 December 1917 – 6 May 2002) was an Indian theatre director, dancer and playwright who was closely associated with IPTA, the cultural wing of the Communist Party of India. She studied with Indira Gandhi at a residential school in the early 1930s, and remained close to the prime minister in later life. She received many government awards and sinecures under the Indira Gandhi administration, including the Padma Shri (1984) and being made chairperson of the National School of Drama (1982–84).

She was the sister of actress Dina Pathak (née Gandhi) and Tarla Gandhi, also a stage performer.

== Background ==
She was a founder-member of the central ballet troupe of the Indian People's Theatre Association (IPTA), and toured the country widely through the 1950s. As a playwright she is remembered as an early pioneer in reviving ancient Indian drama especially Sanskrit drama and folk theatre to modern Indian theatre and amongst her most noted plays are Razia Sultan and Jasma Odan based on a Gujarati legend on the practice of suttee, her own production of the play in Gujarati Bhavai style, became a landmark in contemporary Indian theatre, and along with 'Maina Gurjari' by her sister Deena Gandhi (later Pathak), it is one of the most popular Bhavais today.

She was a founder-member of Avehi, an education resource centre established in 1981, and also remained Chairperson of National School of Drama, 1982–1984. She was awarded the Padma Shri in 1984 by Government of India and the 2001 Sangeet Natak Akademi Award in Direction, given by Sangeet Natak Akademi, India's National Academy of Music, Dance and Drama.

== Early life and education ==
She joined Pupil's Own School, an experimental residential school in Pune in 1932, where she became friends with classmate Indira Nehru. She later moved to Bombay, when her engineer father found her becoming too involved in the left-wing student movement in the 1930s and sent her to England to study medicine. In London she stayed at a Fairfax Road boarding house across the hallway from Indira. Feroze Gandhi lived nearby, and the three of them would go out on the town together. When Indira and Feroze secretly became engaged in 1936, Shanta was the only other person to know about it. Soon she started frequenting India House, meeting up with Krishna Menon and his young 'Free India' associates, and even joined a dance troupe to raise funds for the Spanish Civil War. But before long her father called her back, as the World War II in Europe was starting, thus ending a possible medical career.

== Career ==
She joined Uday Shankar's 'Uday Shankar India Cultural Centre', at Simtola, 3 km from Almora, in Uttarakhand, and studied Bharata Muni's Natyasastra from one of the teachers. She stayed there till it closed down in 1942. Soon after, she became a full-time member of the Little Ballet Troupe, the dance wing of the Indian People's Theatre Association in Bombay (now Mumbai), here along with her young sisters Dina Pathak née Gandhi (1922–2002) and Tarla Gandhi. The ballet troupe created India, Immortal, Man and Machine and the numerous legendary ballets that travelled India in 1950s with Ravi Shankar, Shanti Bardhan and many other performers and artists who later became famous on their own in modern Indian dance theatre and music. The sisters were also involved several years in the revival of Gujarati theatre in Bombay.

In 1952, she started working with a group of children in the village Nikora, on the banks of the Narmada River, in South Gujarat with an informal curriculum. Later, an experimental school attached to the B.M. Institute of Child Psychology and Development, Ahmedabad, adopted this format and in the 1970s at the Bal Bhavan, Delhi took it as well, eventual Avehi was formed in 1981 and in 1990 when AVEHI took up the programme, and named it ABACUS with Shanta Gandhi as Director.

In 1958, Shanta Gandhi was called to Delhi as Asian Theatre Institute was being set up, she joined a Professor of Ancient Indian Drama, in the following year when it merged with the National School of Drama, she continued teaching and in the coming years revived ancient Indian plays starting with Sanskrit drama masters, Kalidasa, Bhasa, Vishakhadatta and Bhavabhuti. She was first to revive 4th century BC, Sanskrit playwright, Bhasa's through her productions of Madhyamavyayoga (1966) (The Middle One) and Urubhanga (The Broken Thigh), a decade before Pannikar and Ratan Thiyam began working with them. She later directed Vishakhadatta's Mudrarakshasa, Virkam Varman's Bhagavadajjukam (1967) all in Hindi. In 1967, she wrote Jasma Odan in Gujarati based on a folk tale, subsequently she translated it in Malavi Hindi with Dr. Shyam Parmar, the result was her most noted production of the Bhavai-based musical Jasma Odhan in 1968, with NSD Repertory Company featuring actors like Manohar Singh and Uttara Baokar. She also did the design for the play, and it resurrected the Bhavai folk theatre from Gujarat. Jasma Odhan remains an integral part of Bhavai repertoire to date and ran successfully in cities like Mumbai, Ahmedabad and Delhi for many years and was also performed in London, Poland and GDR. It was later revived by Nadira Babbar's group Ek jute, which is now performing it for several years now. She also wrote historical play, Razia Sultan which was quite popular and used Nautanki folk theatre style from Uttar Pradesh choreographing her production, Amar Singh Rathor, which she also wrote. She revived interest in Jaishankar Prasad's plays, which though appreciated for literary content were deemed un-stagable by scholars, by successfully staging his 1928 historical play Skanda Gupta, with little changes to the original script. She remained its Chairperson, 1982–1984. She also remained Director, Bal Bhavan, Delhi and National Children's Museum.

== Literary career ==
Apart from plays, she wrote a short story collection Ugata Chhod (1951) and a novel Avinash (1952) in Gujarati. Her Gujaratan ne Pagale Pagale (1948) includes sketches of ancient and modern women.

== Personal life ==
She was married to Marxist historian Victor Kiernan in 1938 in Bombay (now Mumbai), but the couple divorced in 1946 before Kiernan left India.

== Works ==
- Ekalavya. Publisher Bhartiya Sahakari Prakashan Society, 1964.

== See also ==
- List of Gujarati-language writers
