= Pratijnayaugandharayana =

Sanskrit play attributed to Bhāsa

Pratijnayaugandharayana (Sanskrit: प्रतिज्ञायौगन्धरायणम्, Pratijñāyaugandharāyaṇam) (English: The Pledge of Minister Yaugandharāyaṇa) is a Sanskrit play in four acts written by the ancient Indian poet Bhāsa. It is the oldest extant political play of India and the prequel to Bhāsa's Svapnavasavadattam. These plays were written by Bhāsa on the account of Udayana, king of Vatsa (Kaushambi).

Throughout the play, Yaugandharayana, minister of Udayana, takes two vows which are ultimately fulfilled.

== Background ==
Pratijnayaugandharayana was rediscovered, along with Bhāsa's 12 other plays, in 1912 by Indian scholar T. Ganapati Sastri. As with other plays of Bhasa, the name of the author does not appear in the prologue of the play or anywhere else in the extant manuscripts. But a verse from the play is attributed to Bhasa in Subhashitavali, a 15th-century anthology compiled by Vallabhadeva.

The play is based on Udayana's story in the ancient Indian epic Brihatkatha, written by Gunadhya.

== Plot ==
The plot is set before the events of Svapnavasavadattam. It describes the imprisonment of Vatsa King Udayana under Pradyota, King of Ujjayini and the events in Ujjayini, following his capture.

While out on a hunting trip, Prince Udayana is tricked into being captured by his enemy, King Pradyota. Pradyota's daughter, Vasavadatta, takes music lessons from the captured prince, and they fall in love. Yaugandharayana, Udayana's minister, helps them and Udayana elopes with Vasavadatta.

The story is presented through action and narration—by minor characters.

== See also ==
- List of Sanskrit plays in English translation
