= Columbia University Biological Series =

== Volumes ==
Volume	Year	Author	Title	References
1	-	Henry Fairfield Osborn	From the Greeks to Darwin	
2	-	Arthur Willey	Amphioxus and the Ancestry of the Vertebrates	
3	-	Bashford Dean	Fishes, Living and Fossil	-
4	-	Edmund B. Wilson	The Cell in Development and Heredity	
5	-	William Keith Brooks	The Foundations of Zoology	
6	-	Gary Nathan Calkins	The Protozoa	-
7	-	Thomas Hunt Morgan	Regeneration	-
8	-	Jacques Loeb	The Dynamics of Living Matter	
9	-	William Morton Wheeler	Ants: Their Structure, Development and Behavior	

== See also ==
- Columbia University Indo-Iranian Series
