= The Mythology of All Races =

13-volume book series edited by Louis Herbert Gray

The Mythology of All Races is a 13-volume book series edited by Louis Herbert Gray between 1916 and 1932 with George Foot Moore as a consulting editor.

== Volumes ==
- Sherwood Fox, William (1916), Greek and Roman, vol. 1, Boston, Marshall Jones Company
- MacCulloch, John Arnott (1930), Eddic, vol. 2, Boston, Marshall Jones Company
- MacCulloch, John Arnott; Máchal, Jan (1918), Celtic and Slavic, vol. 3, Boston, Marshall Jones Company
- Holmberg, Uno (1927), Finno-Ugric and Siberian, vol. 4, Boston, Marshall Jones Company
- Langdon, Stephen Herbert (1931), Semitic, vol. 5, Boston, Marshall Jones Company
- Keith, Arthur Berriedale; Carnoy, Albert Joseph (1917), Indian and Iranian, vol. 6, Boston, Marshall Jones Company
- Ananikian, Mardiros Harootioon; Werner, Alice (1925), Armenian and African, vol. 7, Boston, Marshall Jones Company
- Ferguson, John Calvin; Anesaki, Masaharu (1928), Chinese and Japanese, vol. 8, Boston, Marshall Jones Company
- Dixon, Roland Burrage (1916), Oceanic, vol. 9, Boston, Marshall Jones Company
- Alexander, Hartley Burr (1916), North American, vol. 10, Boston, Marshall Jones company
- Alexander, Hartley Burr (1920), Latin American, vol. 11, Boston, Marshall Jones Company
- Müller, Wilhelm Max; Scott, James George (1918), Egyptian and Indo-Chinese, vol. 12, Boston, Marshall Jones Company
- Jones, A. Marshall (1932), Complete Index, vol. 13, Boston, Marshall Jones Company

== See also ==
- Columbia University Indo-Iranian Series
