= Stephen Herbert Langdon =

American Assyriologist (1876–1937)

Stephen Herbert Langdon

Stephen Herbert Langdon, FBA (1876 – May 19, 1937) was an American-born British Assyriologist.

== Biography ==
Born to George Knowles and Abigail Hassinger Langdon in Monroe, Michigan, Langdon studied at the University of Michigan, participating in Phi Beta Kappa and earning an A. B. in 1898 and an A. M. in 1899. Following this he went to New York's Union Theological Seminary, graduating in 1903, and then on to Columbia University to obtain a Ph.D. in 1904. Langdon then became a fellow of Columbia in France (1904-1906), during which time he was ordained as a deacon of the Church of England (1905) in Paris. Subsequently, he moved to Oxford University in England (where he was a member of the Jesus College Senior Common Room though not a Fellow), becoming a Shillito Reader in Assyriology in 1908, a British subject in 1913, and after the retirement of Archibald Sayce, Professor of Assyriology in 1919. However, in 1916, when World War I had diminished the size of his classes in England, he spent some time at the University of Pennsylvania Museum of Archaeology and Anthropology, serving as the curator of its Babylonian section.

== Works ==
- Building inscriptions of the Neo-Babylonian empire. Paris: E.Leroux. 1905. (Ph.D. thesis)
- Lectures on Babylonia and Palestine. Paris: P. Geuthner. 1906.
- A chapter from the Babylonian books of private devotion. Babyloniaca; études de philologie Assyro-babylonienne. Paris: Geuthner. 1908.
- Sumerian and Babylonian psalms. Paris, New York: P. Geuthner, G. E. Stechert & co. 1909.
- Tablets from the archives of Drehem. Paris: Paul Geuthner. 1911.
- A Sumerian grammar and chrestomathy. Paris, New York: P. Geuthner, G. E. Stechert & co. 1911.
- Babylonian liturgies. Paris: Geuthner. 1913.
- Tammuz and Ishtar : a monograph upon Babylonian religion and theology containing extensive extracts from the Tammuz liturgies and all of the Arbela oracles. Oxford University Press. 1914. ISBN 978-0-404-18193-2. Internet Archive
- Sumerian epic of Paradise, the Flood and the Fall of Man. Publications of the Babylonian Section vol.10 no.1. Philadelphia: University of Pennsylvania Museum. 1915.
- Sumerian grammatical texts. Publications of the Babylonian Section vol.12 no.1. Philadelphia: University of Pennsylvania Museum. 1917.
- Sumerian liturgical texts. Publications of the Babylonian Section vol.10 no.2. Philadelphia: University of Pennsylvania Museum. 1917.
- The Epic of Gilgamish. Publications of the Babylonian Section vol.10 no.3. Philadelphia: University of Pennsylvania Museum. 1917.
- Sumerian liturgies and psalms. Publications of the Babylonian Section vol.10 no.4. Philadelphia: University of Pennsylvania Museum. 1919.
- Babylonian Wisdom. London: Luzac. 1923. (also Paris: P. Geuthner)
- Sumerian and Semitic religious and historical texts. Oxford editions of cuneiform inscriptions, v. 1. London: Oxford University Press. 1923.
- Historical inscriptions, containing principally the chronological prism, W-B 444. Oxford editions of cuneiform texts, v. 2. London: Oxford University Press. 1923.
- Excavations at Kish. Paris: P. Geuthner. 1924. (with L. Ch. Watelin)
- Babylonian penitential psalms... Oxford editions of cuneiform texts, v. 6. Paris: P. Geuthner. 1927.
- The Venus tablets of Ammizaduga. Oxford: Oxford University Press. 1928. (with J.K. Fotheringham)
- Pictographic inscriptions from Jemdet Nasr excavated by the Oxford and Field Museum Expedition. Oxford editions of cuneiform inscriptions, v. 7. London: Oxford University Press, H. Milford. 1928.
- Semitic [mythology]. The Mythology of All Races. Vol. 5. Boston: Archaeological Institute of America, Marshall Jones. 1931. (also New York: Cooper Square Publishers, 1964)
- Babylonian menologies and the Semitic calendars. The Schweich lectures -- 1933. London: Oxford University Press. 1935. Internet Archive
