= Victor Kiernan =

English Marxist Historian

- Born: Edward Victor Gordon Kiernan; 4 September 1913; Ashton-on-Mersey, Manchester, England
- Died: 17 February 2009 (aged 95); Stow, Scottish Borders, Scotland
- Education: Manchester Grammar School
- Alma mater: Trinity College, Cambridge
- Known for: Communist activism, poetry
- Spouses: Shanta Gandhi (m. 1938; div. 1946) Heather Massey (m. 1984)
- Parents: John Edward Kiernan (father); Ella née Young (mother)
- Relatives: 2 siblings, Dina Pathak (sister-in-law)

Edward Victor Gordon Kiernan (4 September 1913 – 17 February 2009) was a British historian and a member of the Communist Party Historians Group. Kiernan's work was prominent in the field of Marxist historiography in Britain, analyzing historical events from a Marxist point of view. Belonging to a group of prominent British Marxist historians active in the 20th century, Kiernan was a member of the Communist Party of Great Britain from 1934 until 1959, when he left in protest over the party's response to the Hungarian Revolution of 1956. He was also involved in promoting Urdu poetry among Western audiences.

== Life ==
Born in Ashton-on-Mersey, a southern district of Manchester, Kiernan was one of three children born to Ella (née Young) and John Edward Kiernan, who served as a translator of Spanish and Portuguese for the privately owned Manchester Ship Canal. His family came from a congregationalist, non-conformist religious tradition that he later suggested played a role in his socialist formation and that of many of the Communist Party Historians Group founded in 1946.

A scholarship student at the Manchester Grammar School, Kiernan developed a passion for the classics, as he added ancient Greek and Latin to the modern European languages he had already learned at home. Propelled with three new scholarships, he went on to Trinity College, Cambridge, where he achieved a double-starred First in History (B.A.,1934; M.A., 1937). Recruited by Guy Burgess during a time of radical ferment among Cambridge students, Kiernan joined the Communist Party in 1934. He found his radicalism subsequently reinforced by what he regarded as the treachery of Britain's elites. Perhaps the greatest influence on Kiernan was Maurice Dobb: a lecturer in economics at Cambridge, Dobb had joined the Communist Party of Great Britain in 1920 and was open with his students about his communist beliefs. Kiernan later wrote: "We had no time then to assimilate Marxist theory more than very roughly; it was only beginning to take root in England, although it had one remarkable expounder at Cambridge in Maurice Dobb."

In 1938, as a junior fellow, Kiernan departed for Bombay in to continue his political activities and to teach at the Sikh National College and Aitchison College in Lahore, India (now Pakistan). Shortly after his arrival he married the theatre activist and childhood friend of Indira Nehru, Shanta Gandhi. Though they remained friends, they split up when Kiernan returned to Cambridge in 1946 to complete his Fellowship.

Spurned by both Cambridge and Oxford, Kiernan was offered a lectureship in 1948 at the University of Edinburgh, thanks to the intervention of the distinguished historian Richard Pares. In 1970, Kiernan was given a Personal Chair in Modern History; a position he held until his retirement in 1977. Having joined the CPGB in 1934, he finally left in 1959, chiefly in disgust at the suppression of the Hungarian counter-revolution of 1956, after which, he said: "I waited in hopes the party might improve. It didn't."

In 1993 at the age of 80, Kiernan produced Shakespeare: Poet and Citizen a book he had been working on since 1947. A second volume, Eight Tragedies of Shakespeare, followed in 1996. His final book, Horace: Poetics and Politics appeared in 1999. Kiernan died peacefully in his sleep, aged 95, in Stow, Scotland.

== Intellectual legacy ==
Kiernan made contributions to the post-war flowering of British Marxist historiography that transformed the understanding of social history. Seeking escape paths from a congealing Stalinism, this intellectual movement grew from several figures among them - E.P. Thompson, Christopher Hill, Rodney Hilton, Kiernan and Eric Hobsbawm. Brash and confident in wielding the best of the British Left's cultural arsenal, they welcomed open-ended dialogue with non-Marxist traditions. Some of this dialogue was on display in the journal Past & Present, a journal of social history.

Kiernan wrote a major essay in 1952 for the first issue of the journal ("Evangelicalism and the French Revolution"), produced several landmark articles, and later served on its editorial board from 1973 to 1983. He also contributed to New Left Review throughout the journal's transitions. While Thompson, Hill and Hilton were rooted in English social history, Kiernan and Hobsbawm practised a historical craft with more global aspirations. Kiernan's distinctive contributions included the study of elites in history, the mythologies of imperialism, the folklore of capitalism and conservatism, and literature and social change.

== Work with Urdu poetry ==
While steeped in Western literature and the classical heritage of Horace, Kiernan called for an appreciation of Urdu poetry, as he translated works from its literary golden age spanning from Ghalib (1796-1869) to Allama Iqbal (1877-1938) to Faiz Ahmad Faiz (1911-1984). He elevated writers from the East who had been largely banished by guardians of the Western canon and then overlooked by stylish post-modern literary figures looking for more transgressive exemplars of literary craft.

== Marriages ==
He was married twice: to the Indian theatre director, dancer and playwright Shanta Gandhi (Bollywood actress Dina Pathak's sister), from 1938 to 1946; and to the Canadian scholar Heather Massey, from 1984 until his death.

== Selected works/articles ==
- The Dragon and St. George: Anglo-Chinese relations 1880-1885 (1939)
- British diplomacy in China, 1880 to 1885 (1939)
- Poems from Iqbal, Translation (1955)
- The revolution of 1854 in Spanish history (1966)
- The lords of human kind. European attitudes towards the outside world in the Imperial Age (1969)
- Marxism and imperialism: studies (1974)
- America, the new imperialism: from white settlement to world hegemony (1978)
- State & society in Europe, 1550-1650 (1980)
- European empires from conquest to collapse, 1815-1960 (1982)
- The duel in European history: honour and the reign of aristocracy (1988)
- History, classes and nation-states (edited and introduced by Harvey J. Kaye (1988)
- Tobacco: A History (1991)
- Shakespeare, poet and citizen (1993)
- Imperialism and its contradictions (edited & introduced by Harvey J. Kaye; 1995)
- Eight tragedies of Shakespeare: a Marxist study (1996)
- Colonial empires and armies 1815-1960 (1982, 1998)
- Horace: poetics and politics (1999)

=== See also ===
- History & humanism: essays in honour of V.G. Kiernan (edited by Owen Dudley Edwards; 1977)
- Across time and continents: a tribute to Victor G. Kiernan (edited by Prakash Karat; 2003). ISBN 81-87496-34-7.
