= Louis Herbert Gray =

American linguist (1875–1955)

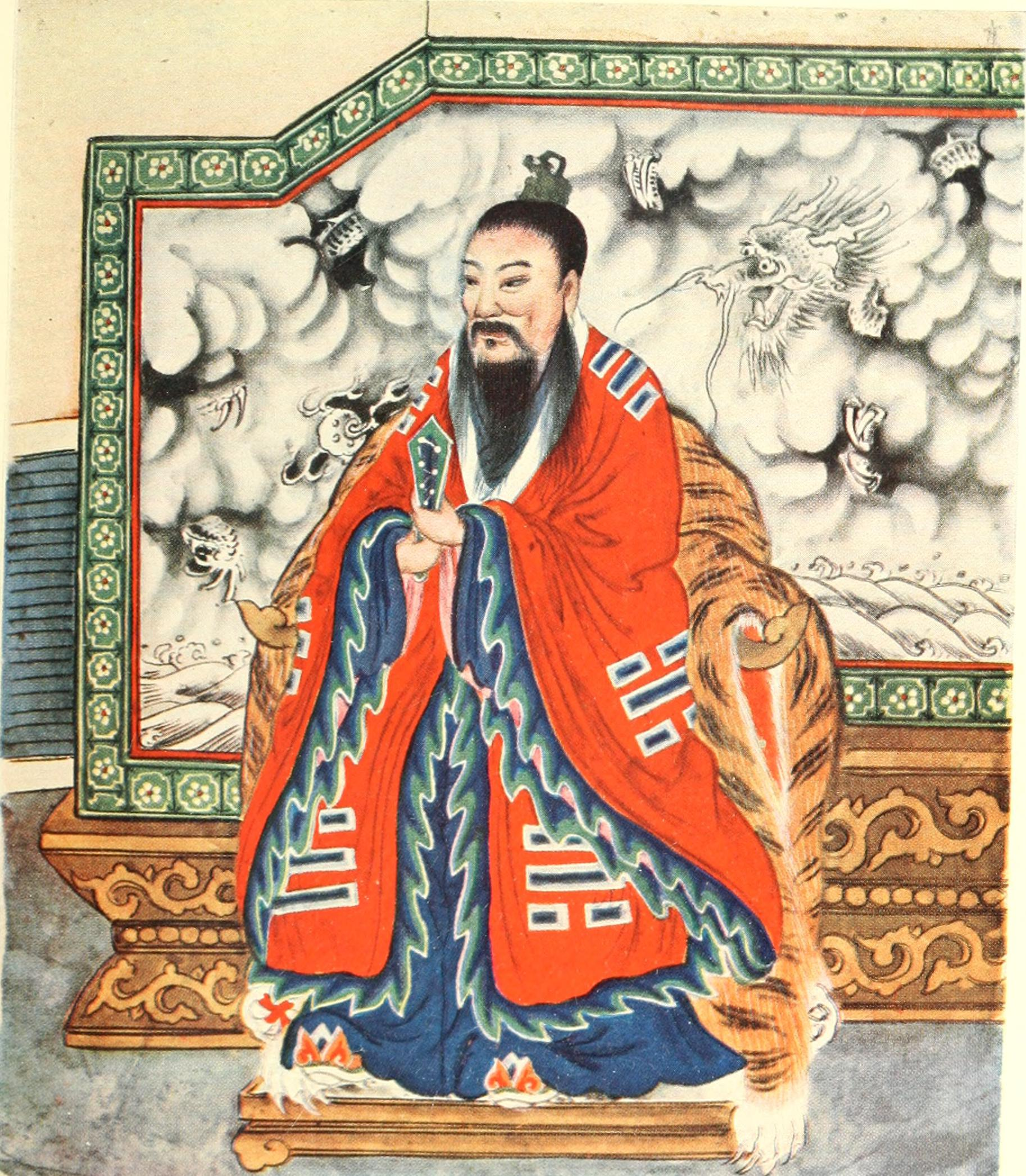
The mythology of all races (1916) by Louis Herbert Gray

Louis Herbert Gray (1875–1955) was an American Orientalist, born at Newark, New Jersey. He graduated from Princeton University in 1896 and from Columbia University (Ph.D., 1900).

Gray contributed to the annals of the New York Academy of Sciences, with contributions on such topics as the Avestan texts. He served as American collaborator on the Orientalische Bibliographie in 1900–1906; revised translations for The Jewish Encyclopedia in 1904–1905; was associate editor of the Hastings Encyclopædia of Religion and Ethics (Edinburgh, 1905–15); editor of Mythology of all Races (1915–18); translated Subandhu's Vasavadatta (1913); and afterwards (1921) served as professor at the University of Nebraska. His 1902 work Indo-Iranian Phonology was published as the second volume of the 13 volume Columbia University Indo-Iranian Series, published by the Columbia University Press, in between 1901–32 and edited by A. V. Williams Jackson.

He was one of the American commissioners to negotiate peace in Paris (1918) and attaché to the American embassy.

== Works ==
- Louis Herbert Gray (1902). Indo-Iranian Phonology: With Special Reference to the Middle and New Indo-Iranian Languages. New York: Columbia University Press.
- Gray, Louis H. & Mumford, Ethel Watts (1904). The Hundred Songs of Kamal ad-Din of Isfahan. New York: Charles Scribner's Sons.
- Gray, Louis H. (1939). Foundations of Language. New York: Macmillan.
