= Svapnavasavadattam =

Sanskrit play attributed to Bhāsa

Svapnavasavadattam (Sanskrit: स्वप्नवासवदत्तम्, Svapnavāsavadattam) (English: The dream of Vasavadatta) is a Sanskrit play in six acts written by the ancient Indian poet Bhāsa.

The plot of the drama is drawn from the romantic narratives about the kaushambi king Udayana and Vasavadatta, the daughter of Pradyota, the ruler of Avanti, which were current in the poet's time and which seem to have captivated popular imagination. The main theme of the drama is the sorrow of Udayana for his queen Vasavadatta, believed by him to have perished in a fire, which was actually a rumour spread by Yaugandharayana, a minister of Udayana to compel his king to marry Padmavati, the daughter of the king of Magadha. It forms, in context, a continuation of his another drama, Pratijnayaugandharayana.

== Background ==
The complete text of the Svapnavasavadattam was long lost until it was discovered by Indian scholar T. Ganapati Sastri in Kerala in 1912.

== Characters ==
The main characters of the play are:

- Udayana (Vatsaraja) – ruler of Kaushambi.
- Vasavadatta – the daughter of Pradyota, king of Avanti, and queen of Udayana.
- Yaugandharayana – Udayana's faithful minister.
- Padmavati – princess of Magadha, sister of King Darsaka. She is Udayana's second wife.
- Vasantaka – a jester and companion to Udayana

== Plot ==
Svapnavasavadattam is a sequel to the Bhāsa's another play Pratijnayaugandharayana (The Pledge of Minister Yaugandharayana) which describes in four acts the events culminating in the marriage of Udayana and Vasavadatta which was brought about by the efforts of Yaugandharayana, Udayana's minister. After the marriage, the Udayana leads a carefree life spending time in hunting, lovemaking, and enjoyment of pleasures while a wicked usurper king Aruni took over most of his territory including the capital Kausambi forcing the king to move to a camp in the border village of Lavanaka. To regain the kingdom, Yaugandharayana hatches a plot to get Udayana married to Padmavati, the sister of the powerful Magadha ruler Darsaka.

In the opening act, Padmavati comes to a hermitage to pay respects to the queen mother who is residing there as a hermit. Yaugandharayana disguised as a brahmin mendicant and Vasavadatta as his sister arrive there and feel offended when the servants push them away. Padmavati meets the queen mother who asks her about the proposal of Udayana for her hand which gladdens Yaugandharayana and Vasavadatta. Now Padmavati announces her willingness to help others, taking advantage of which Yaugandharayana places Vasavadatta under her custody for sometime. A brahmacharin (celibate) arrives to narrate the fire accident at Lavanaka in which, both the minister Yaugandharayana and the queen Vasavadatta have perished. This draws the sympathy of everyone in the hermitage towards Udayana, and Padmavati now begins to cherish the desire to become his wife. Yaugandharayana goes away to fulfil his errand.

Padmavati's love for Udayana grows. In the company of Vasavadatta with whom she feels attached, she spends her time in the palace garden when a nurse informs them that Padmavati has been betrothed to Udayana who has come to the palace. Though this news is painful to Vasavadatta she controls herself since she willingly chose her position to help her husband regain his kingdom. She feels grateful that Udayana, who still remembers her, needed much persuasion before he finally agrees to marry Padmavati.

The news of the marriage of Udayana and Padmavati has been made known. The maid asks Vasavadatta to make the wedding garland to which she agrees. She wreathes the garland selecting only such flowers which are auspicious. Getting no relief in the garden, she retires to get some sleep in a lonely place.

Udayana is happy with his new wife though he recalls his relations with Vasavadatta as called up by Vasantaka, his jester-friend. Listening to the conversation of the king with his friend, Vasavadatta feels gratified that the hero still remembers her. The king sheds tears and feels embarrassed when Padmavati arrives there and enquires of him about his condition. The king being resourceful finds some excuse, but Vasavadatta who notices all this, feels happy. The king retires at the behest of his friend to meet his brother-in-law Darsaka.

Padmavati is reported to be suffering from headache and her bed has been spread in the summer palace. Vasavadatta goes to the room to attend on her. Meanwhile, the king who has already gone to the room finds the bed vacant and reposes there for sometime listening to the story of his friend Vasantaka. He falls asleep and his friend leaves him to bring some blanket. Now Vasavadatta seeing somebody on the bed mistakes the person to be Padmavati and sits on the bed. The king calls her by her name and she feels betrayed, but soon regains confidence knowing that he is only dreaming her presence. He gets up to hold on to her while she flees the room hastily, fearing that she might upset the efforts of Yaugandharayana. The king feels that her touch horripilates him and narrates to his friend Vasantaka who arrives there, his experience of the dream in which he felt that Vasavadatta is really alive. The jester tries to convince him that it is only a dream though the king begins to feel that (his) minister Rumanvan and others have deceived him. Now the news of the battle to crush Aruni is conveyed to shake the king from his stupor.

The enemy has been defeated enabling Udayana to get back his kingdom. Some messengers bring a portrait of Udayana and Vasavadatta from Mahasena on seeing which Padmavati recognises her friend Avantika as Vasavadatta. The king wants to see her and tries to catch hold of her when she is presented. But Yaugandharayana, who has arrived there, interferes to claim his sister. The nurse also recognises Avantika and the whole plot is gradually revealed by the minister who begs pardon of his king for his acts of omission and commission. Everybody is gratified and the play comes to an end on a happy note.

== Reception ==
Svapnavasavadattam is considered to be a masterpiece of Bhāsa.

The play, along with Bhāsa's other 12 plays, was first translated into English by A. C. Woolner and Lakshman Sarup in 1930–31. It was translated into Malayalam by A. R. Raja Raja Varma in 1917.

== Adaptations and performances ==
The play has been adapted to film in Indian cinema as Vasavadatta in 1928 by Nagendra Majumdar, in 1934 by Parshwanath Yeshwant Altekar and as Udayanan Vasavadattha in 1946 by T. R. Raghunath.

The English version of the play, The Vision of Vasavadatta, was performed at the Kennedy Theater, Honolulu during 15 to 24 March 1974. It was directed by Shanta Gandhi.
