= Columbia University Indo-Iranian Series =

The Columbia University Indo-Iranian Series is a 13-volume book series edited by A. V. Williams Jackson and published by the Columbia University Press between 1901 and 1932.

== Volumes ==
| Volume | Year | Author | Title | Reviews | Sources |
|---|---|---|---|---|---|
| 1 | 1914 | A. V. Williams Jackson; Abraham Yohannan | A Catalogue of the Collection of Persian Manuscripts | | |
| 2 | 1902 | Louis H. Gray | Indo-Iranian Phonology | | |
| 3 | 1906 | Montgomery Schuyler Jr. | A Bibliography of the Sanskrit Drama | | |
| 4 | 1901 | Montgomery Schuyler Jr. | Index Verborum of the Fragments of the Avesta | | |
| 5 | 1908 | Justin Hartley Moore | Sayings of Buddha: The Iti-vuttaka | | |
| 6 | 1908 | Maneckji Nusservanji Dhalla | The Nyaishes, or Zoroastrian Litanies | | |
| 7 | 1912 | George C. O. Haas | The Daśarūpa, a Treatise on Hindu Dramaturgy by Dhanamjaya | | |
| 8 | 1913 | Louis H. Gray | Vāsavadattā, A Sanskrit Romance by Subandhu | | |
| 9 | 1917 | George Payn Quackenbos | The Sanskrit Poems of Mayura by Mayura | | |
| 10 | 1923 | G. K. Nariman; A. V. Williams Jackson; Charles J. Ogden | Priyadarsika, a Sanskrit Drama by Harsha | | |
| 11 | 1926 | Jal Dastur Cursetji Pavry | The Zoroastrian Doctrine of a Future Life | | |
| 12 | 1928 | A. V. Williams Jackson | Zoroastrian Studies: The Iranian Religion and Various Monographs | | |
| 13 | 1932 | A. V. Williams Jackson | Researches in Manichaeism, with Special Reference to the Turfan Fragments | | |

== See also ==
- Harvard Oriental Series
- Loeb Classical Library
- Murty Classical Library of India
- The Mythology of All Races
- Columbia University Biological Series
