= Ryons-Alexander House =

- U.S. National Register of Historic Places
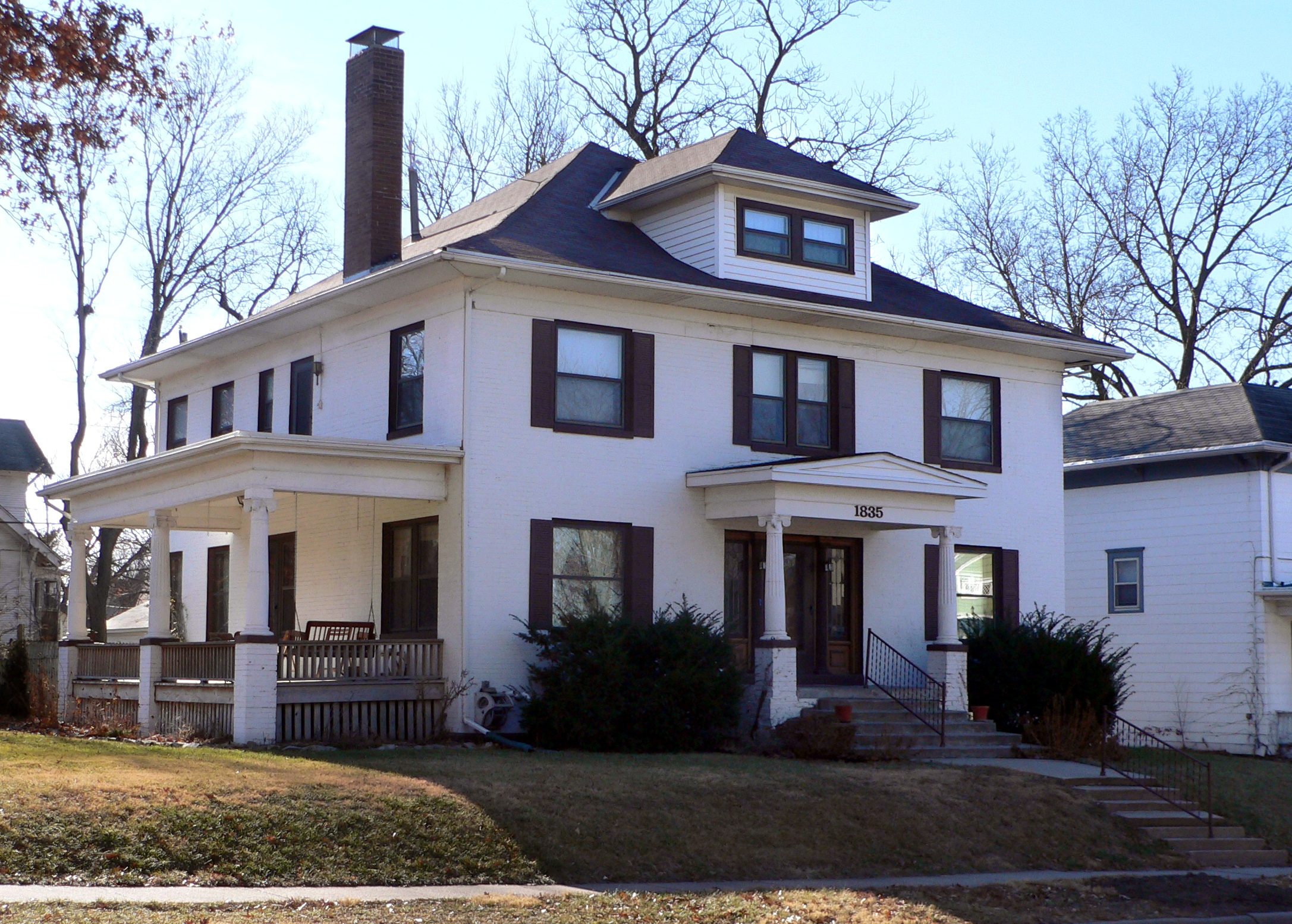
- The house in 2012

- Location within Nebraska Location within the United States
- Location: 1835 Ryons Street, Lincoln, Nebraska
- Coordinates: 40°47′27″N 96°41′39″W
- Area: less than one acre
- Built: 1908
- Built by: Charles J. Gerstenberger
- NRHP reference No.: 82003196
- Added to NRHP: July 8, 1982

The Ryons-Alexander House is a historic house in Lincoln, Nebraska. It was built by Charles J. Gerstenberger in 1908 for William B. Ryons, the son of an Irish immigrant and the vice president of the First National Bank. In 1912, it was purchased by Hartley Burr Alexander, a philosopher and author of several books. It has been listed on the National Register of Historic Places since July 8, 1982.
