= Maneckji Nusserwanji Dhalla =

Pakistani Zoroastrian priest and religious scholar (1875–1956)

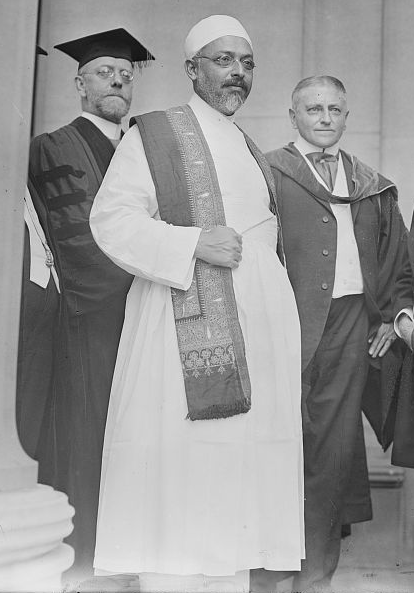
- Dhalla in 1914 at Columbia University
- Born: 22 September 1875; Surat, India
- Died: 25 May 1956 (aged 80); Karachi, Pakistan
- Occupations: Priest and Theologian

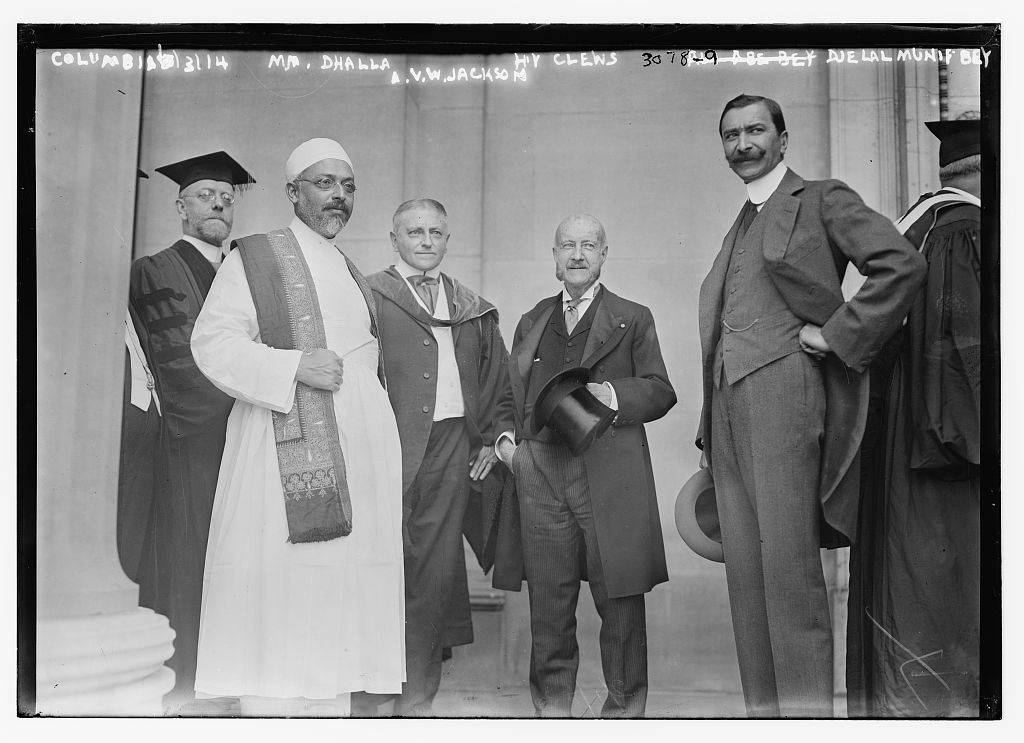
Maneckji Nusserwanji Dhalla, Abraham Valentine Williams Jackson, Henry Clews, and Djelal Munif Bey at Columbia University in 1914

Maneckji Nusserwanji Dhalla (22 September 1875 – 25 May 1956), also abbreviated M. N. Dhalla, was a Pakistani Zoroastrian priest and religious scholar.

Dhalla is best known for his criticism of the orthodox factions within the Parsi community. In particular, he was stringently opposed to the excessive ritualization of religious practice, including that of the use of the Towers of Silence. In his autobiography, he was also critical of the orthodox refusal to accept converts, noting that "the permanent blockade to an influx from outside, the abandoning of the fold by an increasing number of both men and women, and the ever-falling birth-rate of the community [...] it can be said that [the question of conversion] has become the thread on which hangs the very existence of this microscopic community."

The Encyclopædia Iranica entry for Dhalla – written by the son of a contemporary of Dhalla's with whom the Head Priest was at loggerheads for many years – summarizes Dhallas's position as "embroiled in the problem of proselytizing [...] that plagued the community; even though he held liberal views in the matter, he always sided with the orthodox majority." Dhalla himself merely acknowledged that "in replying to questions concerning ceremonies and conventions I do not give my personal opinion as a thinking individual or as a humble scholar or as a reformist, because I have no authority to do so. I am the Head Priest of a [community] that is 75% conservative and of a performing priest-class that is 99% orthodox. These gentlemen consider the later [traditional treatises] as authentic law-books on customs and conventions, hence my replies are perforce based mainly in conformity with their teachings."

== Biography ==
Maneckji Dhalla was born on 22 September 1875 in Surat, India into a family of Godavara priests. At age 3, he was sent with his father Nusserwanji Dhalla to Karachi (then a city in the Sindh province of British India, and today lies in Pakistan), where his father had subsequently employed.

In 1890, at the age of 15, Dhalla began his training for the priesthood. Shortly thereafter he interrupted his studies in order to work and so augment the family's meagre income. In 1894, Dhalla became editor of a monthly magazine Goolshan-e-Danesh. Two years later, Dhalla acquired ownership of the magazine but was forced to shut it down when funds ran out a few months later. The debt incurred would remain with him for many years.

Dhalla completed his clerical training on 21 March 1895 at the age of 20 and his first lecture as a full-fledged priest was on atash, fire. In the next three years, he published six booklets (in the Gujarati language) on various aspects of the Zoroastrian religion. On 21 September 1900, just shy of his 25th birthday, Dhalla delivered his first public lecture in Bombay (present day Mumbai), the first of what would become a lecture tour of the Indian subcontinent.

The lecture series made him famous among the Parsi community, and in August 1901 Dhalla was accepted at the postgraduate degree program in Avestan and Pahlavi studies at the Sir Jamsetjee Jejeebhoy Madressa (today the J. J. Institute) in Bombay. He graduated in 1904, having completed the five-year course in just over three.

In May 1905 and with the financial support of Parsi community (in particular that of the Tata family), Dhalla continued his studies at Columbia University in New York City, where he studied under the personal tutelage of A. V. Williams Jackson, an authority on the Avestan language. Even with the preparatory assistance of Shapurji Saklatvala and Jivanji Jamshedji Modi, New York was initially quite a culture shock for Dhalla, who until his arrival in the United States had never even worn "foreign attire." "How and when to wear these [suits] was quite unknown to me."

Nonetheless, and with great pecuniary discipline, for the next three years Dhalla studied Iranian languages and Sanskrit as majors with minors in philology and philosophy. He received a Master's degree in 1906. Following the publication of his thesis on The Nyaishes or Zoroastrian Litanies, Dhalla was awarded a Ph.D. in May 1908.

The experience at Columbia University gave Dhalla "a new outlook on life" and he began "observing religious literature from a new angle." He "renounced conventional religion" and his "fascination for ritualistic religion" faded. He now "considered ethics as the highest form of religion" and "embraced the path of devotion". His "antagonism for western culture turned to amity." Although it would be later said that his time at Columbia had made him "felt attracted to mysticism," Dhalla unambiguously says the opposite in his own autobiography.

On 22 April 1914 Dhalla and his wife again sailed again for the United States, where Dhalla was to have his book Zoroastrian Theology published. While there, Dhalla delivered a series of lectures on 'The Culture of the East' under the chairmanship of Williams Jackson.

In September 1921 Dhalla, accompanied by his wife and son (Nariman, who would eventually also study at Columbia), again proceeded to New York, this time to have his book Zoroastrian Civilization published. On the way, the family also spent four months in Iran and Iraq, where Dhalla again gave a series of lectures. Although Dhalla was appalled at the living conditions (not just of Zoroastrians), he found that the still-medieval infrastructure afforded him with opportunities for closer contacts with the people that he would have had with more modern forms of transportation. In New York, Dhalla delivered lectures whenever the opportunity arose. Following the publication of his book, Dhalla and family returned to Karachi via London, Paris, Berlin, Vienna, Milan, Rome, and Naples, and felt the effects of the war that had ended only three years previously. Following a five-week layover in Bombay, they returned to Karachi in July 1922.

In 1929, Dhalla journeyed again to New York to attend Columbia University's 175th anniversary celebrations, and at which he received an honorary Doctor of Letters (Litt.D.). His book Our Perfecting World: Zarathushtra's Way of Life was subsequently published there and he again delivered lectures. On his return journey – this time eastwards – he was surprised to discover that he was known in Japan. It turned out that a newspaper article on him had recently been published. Dhalla was upgraded to a first class cabin for the onward journey to Karachi.

In June 1935, Dhalla was awarded the title of Shams-ul Ulema by the British colonial government. In January 1938, Dhalla again travelled to New York, where his magnum opus The History of Zoroastrianism was then published.

On 24 June 1942 his wife Cooverbai died of a stomach affliction. She was 65. Dhalla continued to write and give lectures until 1954. He died in 1956, aged 79. He was the only ordained Dastur or High Priest of Karachi.

== Bibliography ==
Maneckji Nusserwanji Dhalla's works include:

- The Adornment of Priests, Karachi, 1899.
- Footholds of Purity, Karachi, 1900.
- The Nyaishes or Zoroastrian Litanies (Ph.D. thesis), New York, 1908.
- Zoroastrian Theology, New York, 1914, repr. Bombay, 1999.
- Zoroastrian Civilization, New York, 1921, repr. Bombay, 2000.
- Our Perfecting World: Zarathushtra's Way of Life, New York, 1930
- The History of Zoroastrianism, New York, 1938, repr. 1963, 1977, 1985.
- Homage Unto Ahura Mazda, New York, 1941; revised and extended Karachi, 1947.
- Ancient Iranian Literature, Karachi, 1949.
- Mankind Whither Bound?, Karachi, 1950.
- World's Religions in Evolution, Karachi, 1953.

Atma Katha, his autobiography (written in Gujarati) was published in Karachi in 1942. It was subsequently reissued in a revised and extended edition in 1946. Following Dhalla's death, the autobiography was translated into English and published as The Saga of a Soul in Karachi in 1975.

Dhalla is also the author of several articles in the Encyclopedia of Religion and Ethics.

== Works cited ==
- Dhalla, Maneckji Nusserwanji (1975), The Saga Of A Soul: An Autobiography, Karachi: Dastur Dhalla Memorial Institute
- JamaspAsa, Kaikhusroo M. (1996), "Dhalla, Maneckji Nusserwanji", Encyclopædia Iranica, vol. 7, Costa Mesa: Mazda
