= Hartley Burr Alexander =

American philosopher, writer, educator, scholar, poet and iconographer (1873–1939)

Hartley Burr Alexander, PhD (1873–1939), was an American philosopher, writer, educator, scholar, poet, and iconographer.

== Family and early years ==
Alexander was born in Syracuse, Nebraska, on April 9, 1873. His father, the Rev. George Sherman Alexander (1823–1894), was a Methodist minister and pioneer newspaper editor in Nebraska. These twin sources were to implant in young Hartley a delight in the written word and a distrust of Christianity. His mother, Abigail Smith Alexander (1835–1876), died when he was three and in 1877 his father remarried Susan Godding (1829–1893). Ms. Godding had been a teacher and chairperson in the Methodist School in East Greenwich and at Friends College in Providence, Rhode Island, and brought with her to the harsh Nebraska frontier a love of art, music and language that was to stay with Alexander for the remainder of his long and productive life. Living on the frontier exposed Alexander to the ways of the First Peoples and was to instill in him an interest in Native religion and spirituality that was to form one of the paths of life that he was to follow. In 1890, while still in high school he wrote a poem, To a Child's Moccasin, (Found at Wounded Knee) that bucked the current philosophy that "the only good Indian was a dead Indian." This was not to be the only time that Alexander's conscience was to lead him to take an unpopular stand that would put him in opposition to the current American standards.

== Education ==
After graduating from high school in Syracuse, Nebraska in 1892 Alexander attended the University of Nebraska in nearby Lincoln. Following that he attended graduate school at the University of Pennsylvania and obtained his doctorate at Columbia University in 1901.

He received the Knight of the Legion of Honor award from the government of France in 1936 and was awarded an Honorary Membership in the American Institute of Architects for his collaboration with many of its architect members.

== Career and accomplishments ==
He was on the staff of Webster's Dictionary from 1903 to 1908, then became professor of philosophy at the University of Nebraska.

== Writings ==
His published writings include:

- The Problem of Metaphysics (1902)
- Poetry and the Individual (1906)
- The Mid-Earth Life (1907)
- Odes on the Generations of Man (1910)
- The Religious Spirit of the American Indian (1910)
- The Mystery of Life (1913)
- The Mythology of All Races, volume x: North American (1916); volume xi: Latin American (1920)
- Liberty and Democracy (1918)
- Letters to Teachers (1919)
- God's Drum - and Other Cycles from Indian Lore (1927)
- Truth and the Faith (1929)
- God and Man's Destiny: Inquiries into the Metaphysical Foundations of Faith (1936)
- The World's Rim - Great Mysteries of the North American Indians (1953) (Posthumous)

He wrote a volume of poetry, Odes and Lyrics (1921). In 1919 he served as president of the American Philosophical Society.

== Iconographer ==
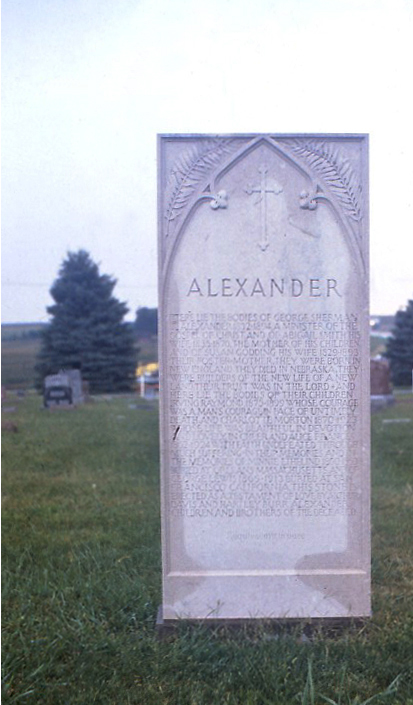
Alexander Family tombstone, Syracuse, Nebraska

Burr is believed to have coined the term iconographer to describe the work that he did developing iconographic schemes, decorative themes and inscriptions for a large number and variety of public buildings in the United States. These include:

- Alexander family burial plot marker, Lee Lawrie, sculptor, c.1924, Syracuse, NE
- California Institute of Technology
- Century of Progress Exhibition, Chicago, Illinois, 1933
- Kansas City City Hall, Wight & Wight, architects, 1936, Kansas City, Missouri. In this commission each of the three sculptors involved, C. Paul Jennewein, Walker Hancock and Ulrik Ellerhusen were required to each pay Alexander $100 from their fee for his input
- Fidelity Mutual Insurance Building, Zantzinger, Borie and Medary, architects, Lee Lawrie, sculptor, 1926, Philadelphia, Pennsylvania
- Goodhue Memorial Fountain

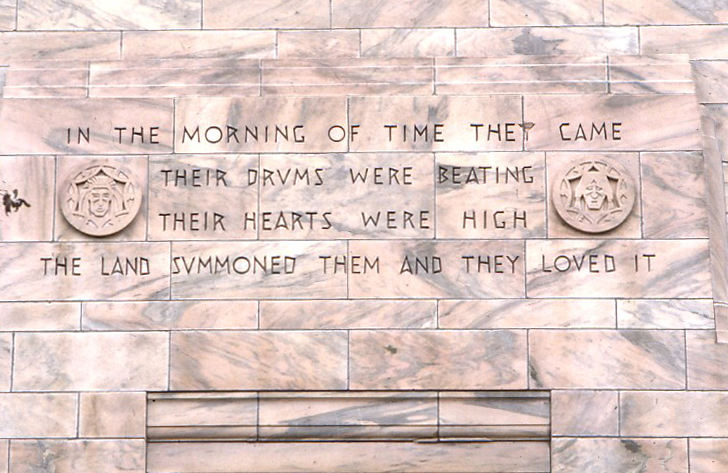
Inscription, Joslyn Art Museum, Omaha, Nebraska

- Joslyn Art Museum, John and Alan McDonald, architects, 1931, Omaha Nebraska
- Justice Department Building, Zantzinger, Borie and Medary, architects, 1931–1934, Washington D.C.
- Los Angeles Public Library, Bertram G. Goodhue, architect, Lee Lawrie, sculptor, Los Angeles, California
- Memorial Stadium, Lincoln, Nebraska
- Metropolitan Life Insurance Company Home Office Building, Ottawa, Canada
- Myron Taylor Hall, Cornell University, Ithaca, New York
- Nebraska State Capitol, Bertram G. Goodhue, architect, Lee Lawrie, sculptor, Lincoln Nebraska
- Oregon State Capitol, Salem, Oregon Leo Friedlander, sculptor
- Rockefeller Center, Lee Lawrie, Paul Manship, Rene Paul Chambellan et al., sculptors NYC
- Ellen Phillips Samuel Memorial, Paul Cret architect, Einar Jónsson, Heinz Warneke, John Flannagan, Jacques Lipchitz et al., sculptors, 1932 Philadelphia Pennsylvania
- State Finance Building, Harrisburg, Pennsylvania
- Title and Trust Building, Los Angeles, California

== Legacy ==
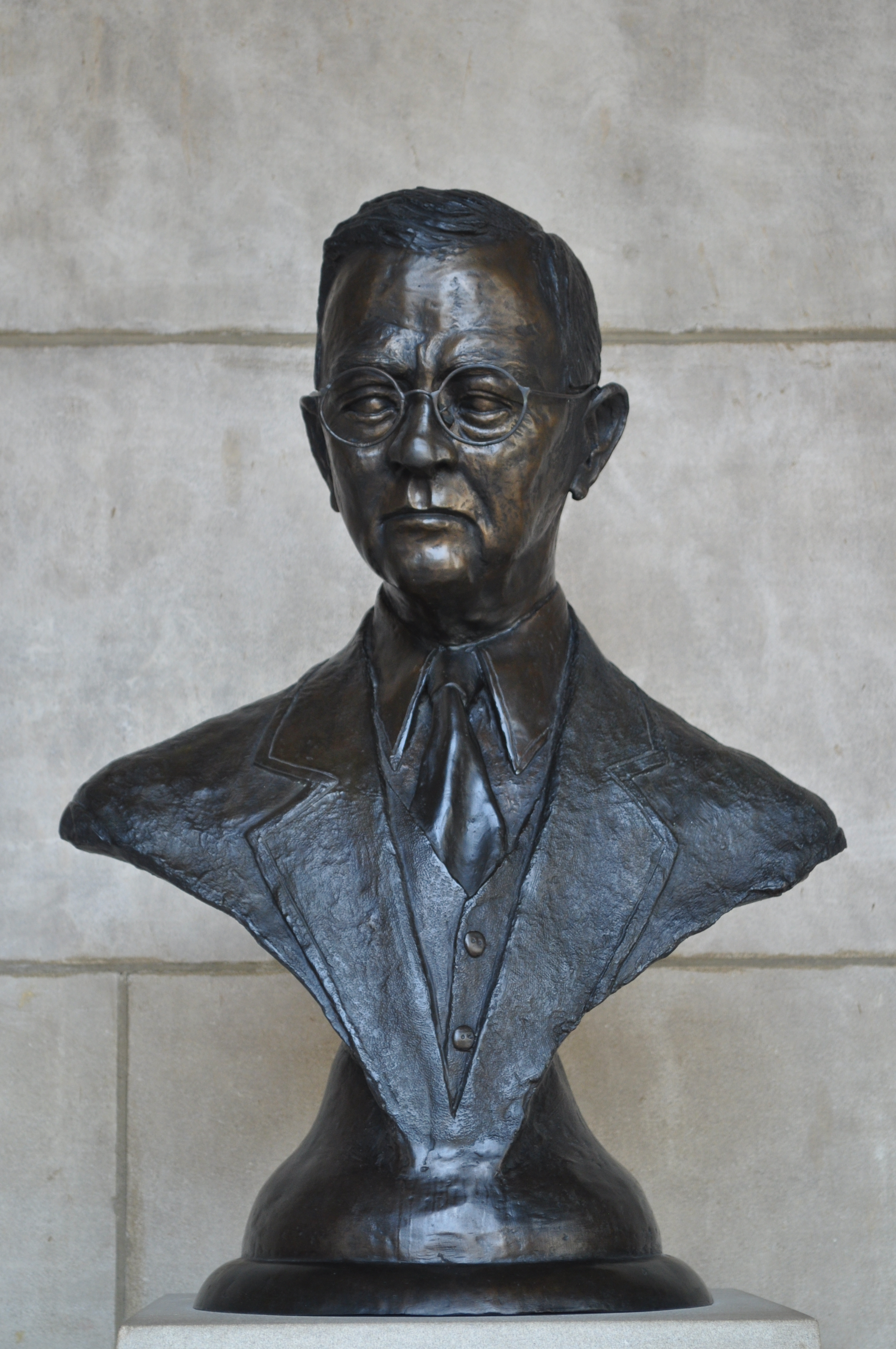
Bust of Alexander created by Tom Palmerton in 1990 for the Nebraska Hall of Fame.

The Ryons-Alexander House, which he purchased, later was listed on the National Register of Historic Places on July 8, 1982.

He was inducted into the Nebraska Hall of Fame in 1988.

== See also ==
- Ryons-Alexander House, which he purchased; it was listed on the National Register of Historic Places on July 8, 1982.
- American philosophy
- List of American philosophers
- Nebraska Hall of Fame

== Sources ==
- Kvaran and Lockley Architectural Sculpture in America, unpublished manuscript
- Luebke, Frederick C. Editor, A Harmony of the Arts – The Nebraska State Capitol, University of Nebraska Press, Lincoln, Nebraska 1990
- Masters, Magaret Dale, Hartley Burr Alexander—Writer-In-Stone, Margaret Dale Masters 1992.
- Whitaker, Charles Harris, Editor, Text by Hartley Burr Alexander, Lee Lawrie, Paul Cret et al., Bertram Grosvenor Goodhue, Architect-and Master of Many Arts, Press of the American Institute of Architects, Inc., NYC 1925
- Whitaker, Charles Harris and Hartley Burr Alexander, The Architectural Sculpture of the State Capitol at Lincoln Nebraska, Press of the American Institute of Architects, NY 1926
