= A. V. Williams Jackson =

American linguist (1862–1937)

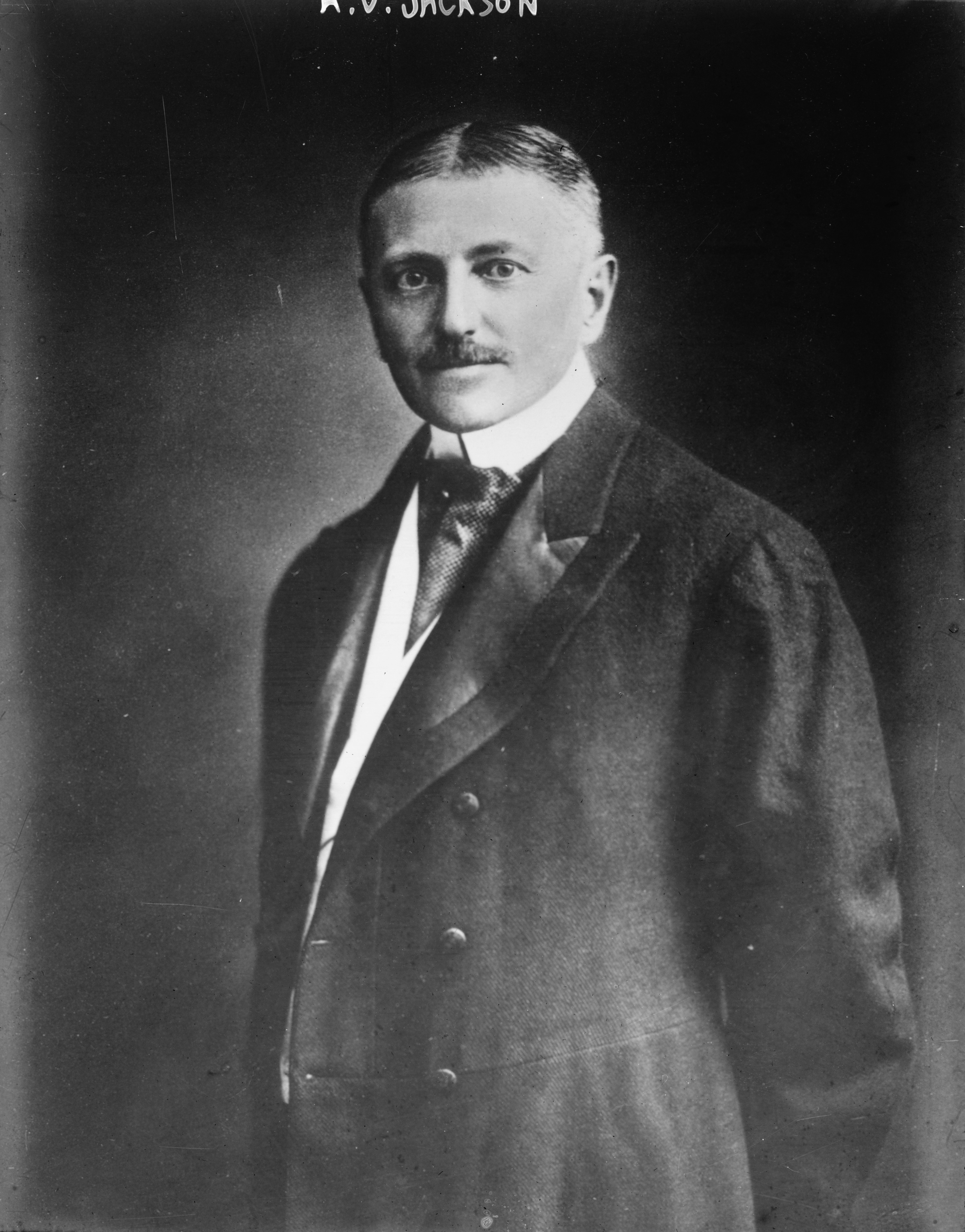
- Born: Abraham Valentine Williams Jackson; 9 February 1862; New York City
- Died: 8 August 1937 (aged 75); New York City
- Occupation: Iranologist

Abraham Valentine Williams Jackson, L.H.D., Ph.D., LL.D. (February 9, 1862 – August 8, 1937) was an American specialist on Indo-European languages.

== Biography ==
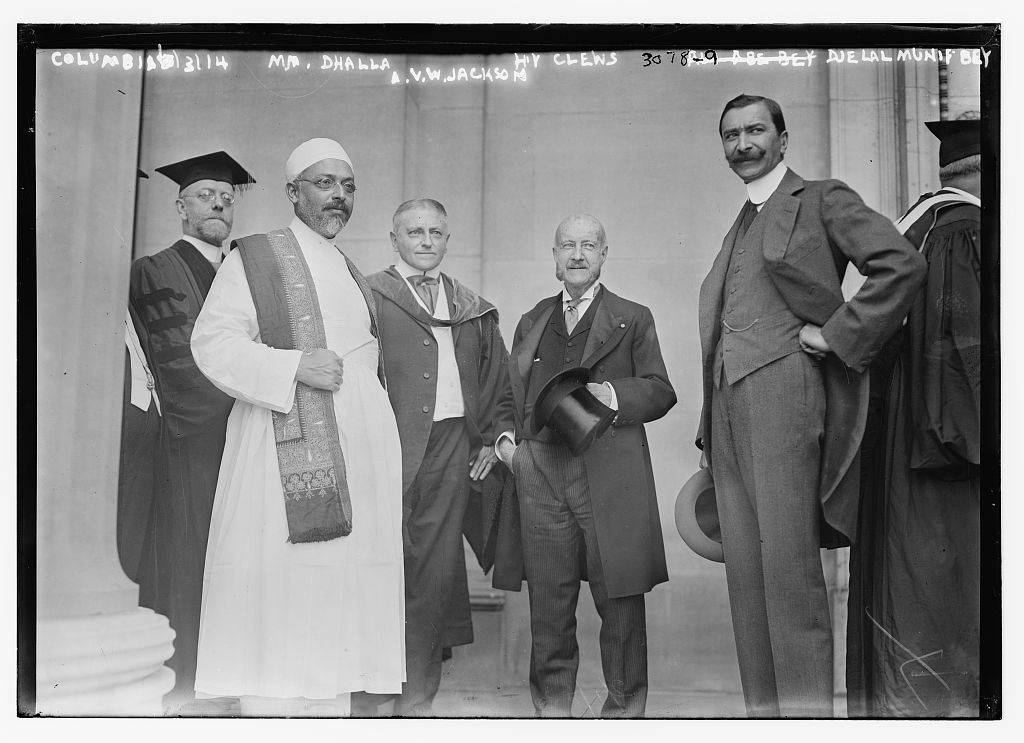
Left to right: Unknown, Maneckji Nusserwanji Dhalla, A. V. W. Jackson, Henry Clews, and Djelal Munif Bey at Columbia University in 1914

He was born in New York City on February 9, 1862. He graduated from Columbia University in 1883. He was a fellow in letters there from 1883 to 1886, and an instructor in Anglo-Saxon and the Iranian languages from 1887 to 1890. After studying at the University of Halle from 1887 to 1889 he became an adjunct professor of English language and literature. In 1895, he was appointed public lecturer and also appointed to the newly founded professorship of Indo-Iranian languages at Columbia University, where he remained until 1935.

He was well known as a lecturer on English literature and the Orient. In 1901, during a visit to India and Ceylon, he received special attention from the Parsees, who presented to Columbia a valuable collection of Zoroastrian manuscripts in recognition of the instruction there given by him in their ancient texts. In 1903 he made a second journey to the Orient, this time visiting Iran. He also visited Central Asia sometime before 1918.

Jackson's grammar of Avestan, the language used in the Zoroastrian scriptures, is still considered to be the seminal work on the topic. Jackson was one of the directors of the American Oriental Society. He was elected to the American Philosophical Society in 1909.

He died on August 8, 1937.

== Publications ==
- A Hymn of Zoroaster (1888)
- An Avesta Grammar in Comparison with Sanskrit (1892)
- An Avesta Reader (1893)
- Avesta, the Bible of Zoroaster (1893)
- Zoroaster, the Prophet of Ancient Iran (1898)
- Die iranische Religion (1900)
- Persia, Past and Present (1906)
- Descriptive Catalogue of the Persian MSS. in the Metropolitan Museum of Art’ (1913)
- From Constantinople to the Home of Omar Khayyam (1911)
- A Descriptive Catalogue of the Persian Manuscripts Presented to the Metropolitan Museum of Art by A. S. Cochran (1914), with A. Yohannan
- Early Persian Poetry (1920)
- Jackson, A V Williams. A History of India. (Editor). Full text online at ibiblio.org (All nine volumes in HTML form, complete, chapter-by-chapter, with all illustrations, footnotes and a combined index)

He made many contributions to the Journal of the American Oriental Society.

He edited the Columbia University Indo-Iranian Series (13 vols., New York, 1901–32).

== Sources ==
- New General Catalog of Old Books and Authors
- Encyclopaedia Iranica, https://referenceworks.brillonline.com/entries/encyclopaedia-iranica-online/jackson-abraham-valentine-williams-COM_3772?s.num=0&s.f.s2_parent=s.f.book.encyclopaedia-iranica-online&s.q=jackson%2C+william
