= Bhāsa =

Indian playwright in Sanskrit

Bhāsa is one of the earliest Indian playwrights in Sanskrit, predating Kālidasa. Estimates of his floruit range from the 4th century BCE to the 4th century CE; the thirteen plays attributed to him are commonly dated closer to the first or second century CE.

Bhasa's plays had been lost for centuries until the manuscripts were rediscovered in 1910 by the Indian scholar Ganapati Shastri. Bhāsa had previously only been known from mentions in other works, such as the Rajashekhara's Kāvya-mimāmsā, which attributes the play Swapnavāsavadattam to him.

In the introduction to his first play Mālavikāgnimitram, Kālidāsa wrote: "Shall we neglect the works of such illustrious authors as Bhāsa, Saūmilla, and Kaviputra? Can the audience feel any respect for the work of a modern poet, a Kālidāsa?"

== Date ==
Bhāsa's date of birth is uncertain: he likely lived after Aśvaghoṣa (1st-2nd century CE) as a verse in his Pratijna-yaugandharayana is probably from Aśvaghoṣa's Buddha-charita. He definitely lived before Kālidāsa (4th-5th century CE), who knew of his fame as an established poet. Bhāsa's language is closer to Kālidāsa than it is to Aśvaghoṣa.

Indian scholar M.L. Varadpande dates him as early as 4th century BCE. According to British scholar Richard Stoneman, Bhasa may have belonged to the late Maurya period at the earliest, and was already known by the 1st century BCE. Stoneman notes that the thirteen plays attributed to Bhasa are generally dated closer to the 1st or 2nd century CE. Other scholarly estimates of Bhasa's floruit range from the late 2nd century CE to the 4th century CE.

Bhāsa's works do not follow all the dictates of the Natya Shastra. This has been taken as a proof of their antiquity; no post-Kālidāsa play has been found to break the rules of the Natya Shastra. Scenes from Bhāsa present signs of physical violence on the stage, as in plays like Urubhangam. This is strictly frowned upon by Natya Shastra. However, these facts alone don't make chronology certain. Indu Shekhar states that, "Whatever the exact date [of Natya Shastra] may have been, it is significant that no direct reference to NS was made before the seventh century," when it became accepted as the subject of attention for many poets, writers, and theorists.

== Plays of Bhāsa ==
The Urubhanga and Karna-bhara are the only known tragic Sanskrit plays in ancient India. Though branded the villain of the Mahabharata, Duryodhana is the actual hero in Uru-Bhanga shown repenting his past as he lies with his thighs crushed awaiting death. His relations with his family are shown with great pathos. The epic contains no reference to such repentance. The Karna-bhara ends with the premonitions of the sad end of Karna, another epic character from Mahabharata. Early plays in India, inspired by Natya Shastra, strictly considered sad endings inappropriate.

The plays are generally short compared to later playwrights and most of them draw on themes from the Indian epics, Mahabharata and Ramayana. Though he is firmly on the side of the heroes of the epic, Bhāsa treats their opponents with great sympathy. He takes a lot of liberties with the story to achieve this. In the Pratima-nataka, Kaikeyi who is responsible for the tragic events in the Ramayana is shown as enduring the calumny of all so that a far noble end is achieved.

Following plays are attributed to Bhāsa

=== Plays based on Ramayana ===
- Pratimā-nāṭaka
- Abhiṣeka-nāṭaka
- Yajnaphalam-nāṭaka

=== Plays based on Mahābhārata ===
- Dūtavākya
- Karṇabhāra
- Dūtaghaṭotkaca
- Ūrubhaṅga
- Madhyama-vyāyoga
- Pañcarātra

=== Based on story of Bṛhatkathā ===
- Pratijñā-Yaugandharāyaṇa
- Svapnavāsavadatta
- Avimāraka
- Cārudatta

=== Other plays ===
- Bālacarita: On childhood of Kṛṣṇa and slaying of Kaṃsa

His most famous plays — Pratigya Yaugandharayanam (the vow of Yaugandharayana) and Swapnavāsavadattam (Vasavadatta in the dream) — are based on the legends that had grown around the legendary King Udayana, probably a contemporary of the Gautama Buddha. Another play called Yajñaphalam is also attributed to him.

== Modern revival ==
The first person to revive Bhasa in modern Indian theatre was a Professor of Ancient Indian Drama at National School of Drama, and theatre director, Shanta Gandhi, who first directed productions of Madhyamavyayoga (1966) ("The Middle One") and Urubhanga ("The Broken Thigh") in Hindi. A decade later, his work was approached by playwright Kavalam Narayan Panikkar and theatre director, Ratan Thiyam using Manipuri dance and theatre traditions, and traditional martial art of Thang-Ta, who first performed Karna-bhara ("Karna's burden") in 1976, and later Urubhanga.

Waman Kendre did an adaptation of Madhyama Vyāyoga in three different languages: O My Love in English, Mohe Piya in Hindi and Piya Bawari in Marathi.

== See also ==
- Sanskrit literature
- Sanskrit drama
- Urubhanga
