= Urubhanga =

Sanskrit play written by Bhāsa

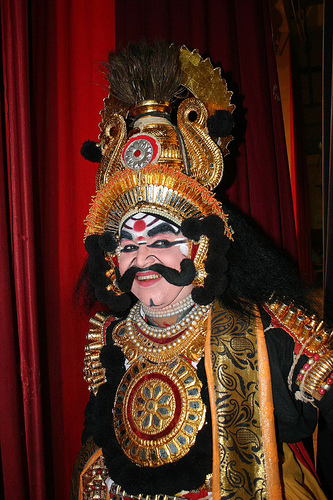
An actor portraying Duryodhana in a Yakshagana play

Urubhanga or Urubhangam, (English: Shattered Thighs) is a Sanskrit play written by Bhasa in the 2nd or 3rd century CE. Based on the well-known epic, the Mahābhārata, by Vyasa, Urubhanga focuses on the story of the character Duryodhana during and after his fight with Bhima. Although Urubhanga contains the same core storyline as that in the Mahābhārata, Bhasa's altering of certain aspects results in a different presentation of the story. The most extreme of these alterations is Bhasa's portrayal of Duryodhana, who, in the Mahābhārata, is viewed as a villain, but in Urubhanga is given more human qualities. Bhasa's presentation of Duryodhana's side of the tale adds certain tragic elements to the play.

== Synopsis ==
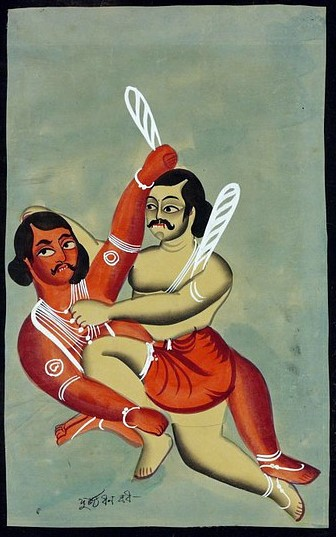
Duryodhana fights Bhima

Urubhanga is derived from the famous epic Mahabharata. Although portrayed as a villain in the original play, the protagonist Duryodhana is presented in a different light in Urubhanga. He isn't exempted from his original evil deeds, but he is shown as a character with heroic qualities. The play centers around events that happen preceding his death; Duryodhana is shown repenting his past, reconciling with his family, and realizing the futility of war.

In the beginning of the play there are three soldiers that are marveling at the battlefield between the Kauravas and Pandavas. They describe the scene before them in gory detail, each taking turn to muse and exclaim over the various details that they observe. As they progress through the battlefield, they arrive to the battle between the middle Pandava Bhima and the Kaurava Duryodhana

The soldiers then proceed to describe the fight between Bhima and Duryodhana. The audience is seeing the battle entirely through the description of the three soldiers; ultimately, Bhima falls from Duryodhana's incessant blows. Duryodhana, refusing to kill Bhima while he is on the ground, instead has his thighs crushed by Bhima from false play and violation of rules.

After Duryodhana has fallen, Bhima is carried away hurriedly by the other Pandavas, and Duryodhana is left on the battleground. This act of false play incites the anger of Baladeva, who wants to seek justice. However, Duryodhana stops him, having become resigned; this begins the part of the play that starts to emphasize the heroic qualities of Duryodhana.

Duryodhana blames Krishna and forgives Bhima, as the play progresses, he is reconciled with his blind parents, then his queens (Malavi and Pauravi), and his son. Duryodhana is distressed about his situation, as he can no longer salute his father, nor can he let his son sit on his thigh. He also rejects the futility of war.

At the end of the play, Ashvatthaman, the preceptor's son, appears with the intent to seek revenge for Duryodhana and kill the Pandavas during the night, and Ashvatthaman names Durjaya, Duryodhana's son, as king of the kingdom right before Duryodhana dies. However, it needs to be noted that the play does not end completely in a tragic note, as there are signs of hope for the future, since it is unorthodox for Indian Sanskrit dramas to end only on a sad note.

== Adaptations ==
Urubhangam was presented by the Bangladesh Centre for Asian Theatre, adapted by Niranjan Adhikari and directed by Kamaluddin Nilu. The premier of the play was held at Theatre Festival Varmland, Sweden in 2001. The performance is characterized by elements of Bengali folk theatre forms, rites, chorus, dance and modern techniques which goes beyond traditional forms of Sanskrit drama. The Centre for Asian Theatre performed at the Huashan Arts District Outdoor Tent Theatre hosted by the Department of Cultural Affairs of Taipei City Government.

The Urubhanga was also adapted by Kavalam Narayana Panikkar. This version was remodified in the theyyam style. Panikkar created two Duryodhanas in the play in which one is the mortal Duryodhana and the other is Suyodhana. Ratan Thiyam's production of the play uses Manipuri dance and theatre traditions, as well as traditional martial art, Thang-Ta.

Play is also adapted in Dogri by Kumar. A. 'Bharti', Designed by Abhishek Bharti and Directed by Aaditya Bharti which was declared as Best Production of 2017 by J&K State Cultural Academy. Its a highly experimental Production blends with Folk forms of Dogra region of J&K. Production got 10 State Cultural Academy Awards which includes Best Director Aaditya Bharti, Best Music Abhishek Bharti, Best Make up Shammi Dhamir, Best Costumes kamal Mohini and Acting Awards To Kanav Sharma, Sushmita Banerjee, Niharika Sakshi, Nitin Babu.

Adaptations of Sanskrit classics including the Urubhanga was also staged by the Suvarna Karnataka, choreographed by Maya Rao.

== Studies ==
Pusalker, A.D. Bhasa - a study. Munshiram Manoharlal Publishers Pvt. Ltd. New Delhi, India 1968

Sharma, A. Essays on the Mahabharata. Leiden, 1991

Dharwadker, A.B. Theatres of Independence: Drama, Theory, and Urban Performance in India since 1947. University of Iowa Press, 2005

Bhat, G.K. Tragedy and Sanskrit Drama. Popular Prakashan(P) Ltd. Mumbai, India 1974

Skilton, A. How the nāgas were pleased by Harṣa; & The shattered thighs by Bhāsa. New York University Press: JJC Foundation, 2009.

Bhasa's Urubhanga and Indian Poetics In this article, Gerow examines the differences between the Urubhanga and the Mahabharata ‘original’. In the Urubhanga, the villain is portrayed as the moral hero since it is Duryodhana who acts as the guide and teacher for the reader. The play draws attention to discipline over self, compassion for the enemy, reconciliation within the family. Gerow also indicates the differences between the Urubhanga and Sanskrit dramaturgy as well as the structure.

G.K. Bhat in his book Tragedy and Sanskrit Drama studies the tragic design and intent established in the play. According to Bhat, Bhasa is the single Sanskrit dramatist to experiment with ancient material to produce tragic structure. Introducing tragic motive into the play was limited and attempt at delineating the character or action was considered a denial of the existing legend and the fabrication of a new one. Therefore, Bhat is a solitary case of a daring experiment in Sanskrit dramatic literature as he breaks away from the traditional epic framework.

In Bhasa's Urubhanga the incident and featured characters are taken from the epic but Bhasa re-orients the incident and presents it with a new motivation. In Bhasa's version, the breaking of the thighs is over before the main scene of the play opens. Also, Bhasa portrays Duryodhana as a tragic hero with heroic courage and calm determination with which he accepts his inevitable end. Eventually, Duryodhana dies like a hero. Since the Mahabharata is deeply rooted in the Indian tradition those with traditionally fixed attitudes find it difficult to accept Bhasa's rendition of the Urubhanga.

== Translations ==
Urubhanga has been translated into English.

- Rangachar, S. Ūrubhaṅgam. One act play. With introd., translation, notes. Mysore, Samskrita Sahitya Sadana, 1967
- Devadhar, C.R. Urubhangam, Urubhangam, Breaking of Thighs, a Sanskrit One-Act Play Attributed to Bhasa. Poona: Oriental Book Agency, 1940.
- Menon, K.P.A. Complete Plays of Bhasa (Text With English Translation and Notes). 2003 ed. Nag Publishers, 2003.
- Sarup, Lakshman, and A.C. Woolner. Thirteen Plays of Bhasa. Delhi: Motilal Banarsidass, 1985.
- Haksa A.N. The Shattered Thigh and Other Plays. England: Penguin Publishers, 2008.

== See also ==
- Bhasa
- Mattavilasa
- Madhyamvyayoga
- Mahābhārata
- Sanskrit Drama
