= Udayana (king) =

Legendary 6th-century BC Indian King

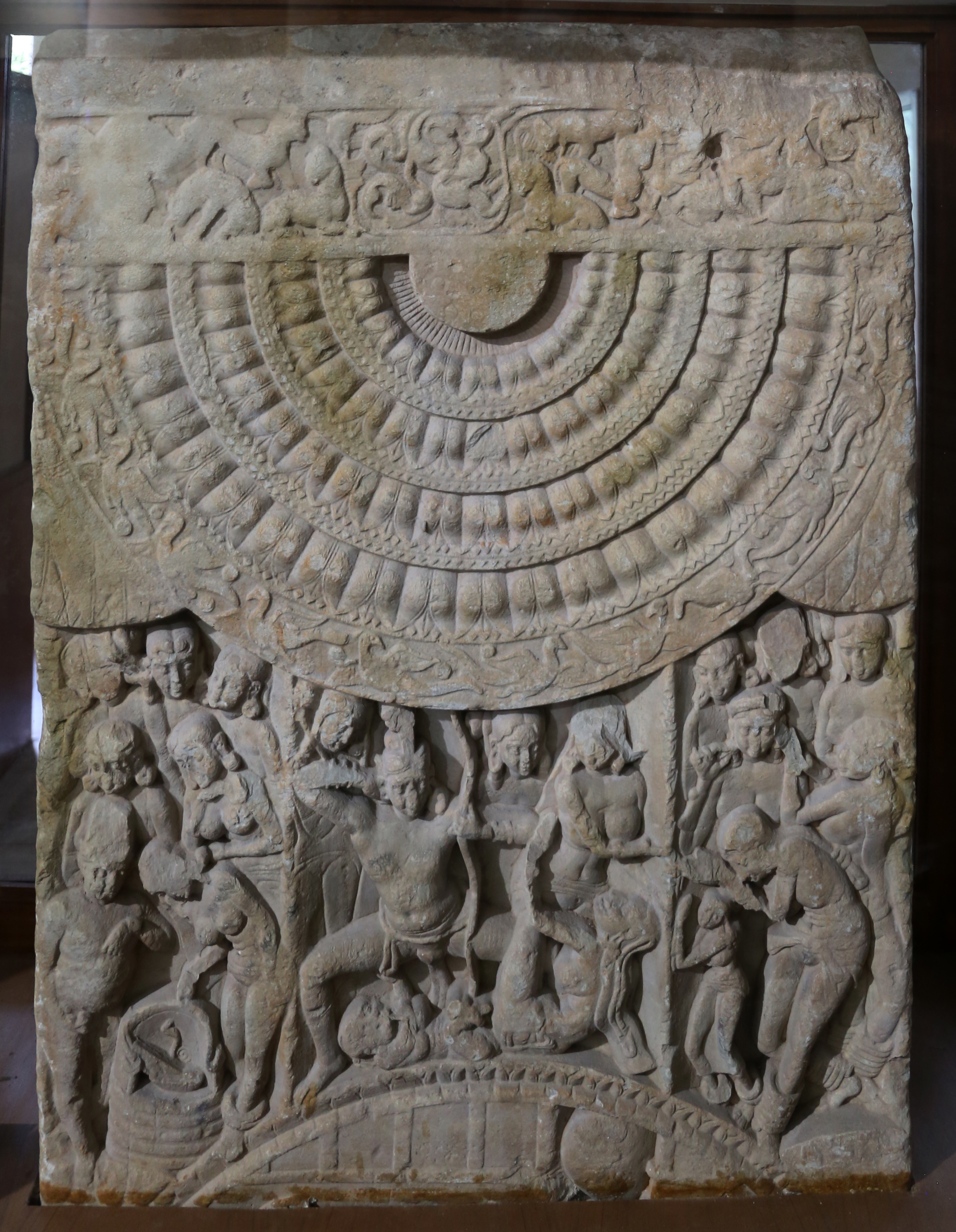
- Udayana and his three queens, Amaravarti Stupa, c. 150 AD

King of Vatsa
- Reign: 6th century BC
- Father: Śatānīka II
- Mother: Mṛgāvatī

Udayana was a king of Vatsa in India, a contemporary of Gautama Buddha. He is a popular figure in Indian literature, for both his romantic and military stories, but though he probably existed, little is known for certain about his life or reign.

According to Buddhist sources, the Buddha visited Kauśāmbī several times during the reign of Udayana on his effort to spread the dharma, the Noble Eightfold Path and the Four Noble Truths. Udayana was an upasaka (lay follower) of Buddha. The Chinese translation of the Buddhist canonical text Ekottara Āgama states that the first image of Buddha, carved out of sandalwood, was made under the instruction of Udayana.

== Life ==
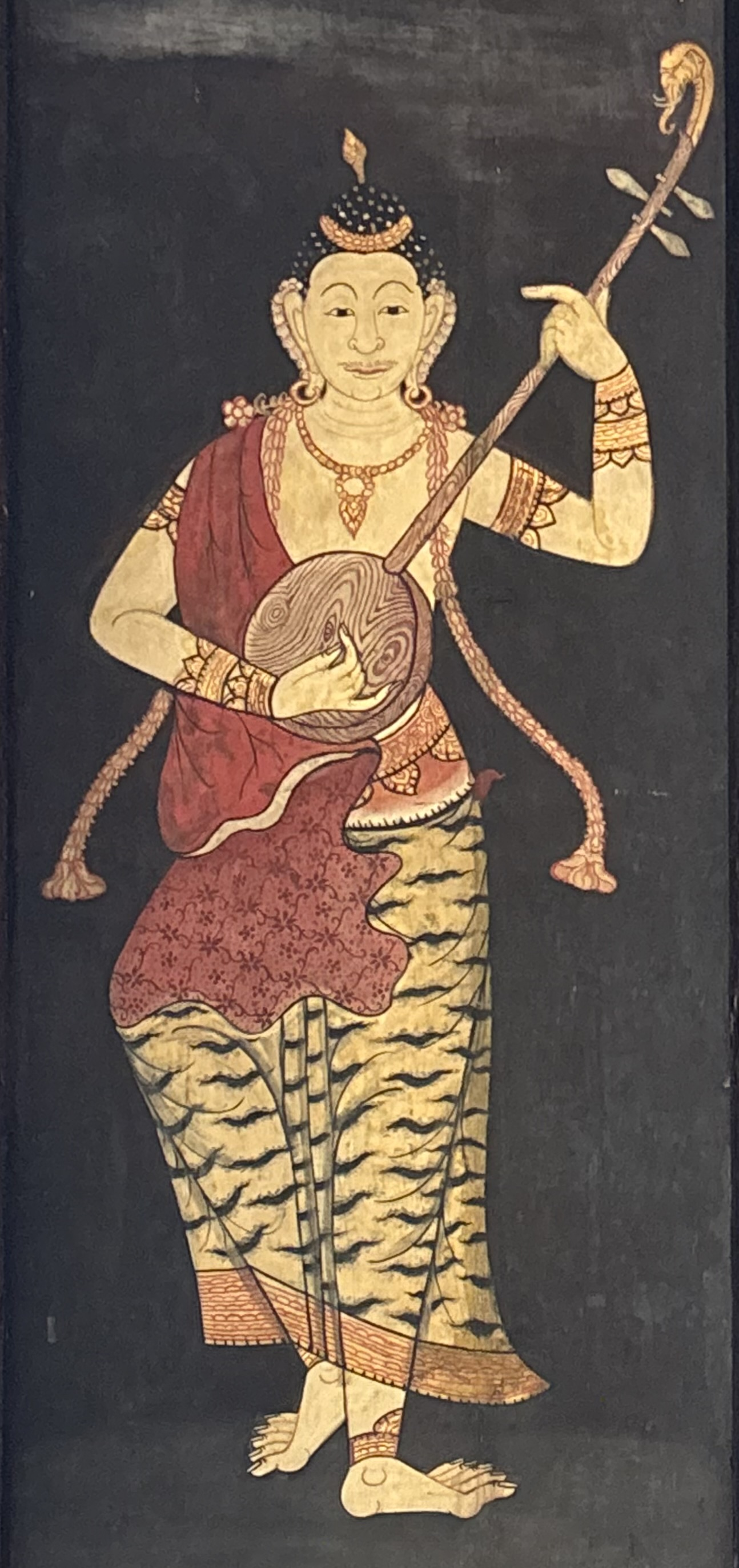
Thai depiction of Udayana in Wat Bowon Sathan Sutthawat, Bangkok, 19th century

Udayana, the son of Śatānīka II by the Videha princess succeeded him. Niti Adaval mentions about Udayana and his love for music, art and fondness of women. Due to a dohada ("pregnancy craving"), Mṛgāvatī, pregnant with Udayana, is either covered or immersed in red. A monstrous bird mistakes her for raw meat and carries her away, later dropping her. She is cared for in a hermitage, where she raises her son. Udayana obtains a wonderful lute, elephant taming skills, and confidants; he and his mother eventually return to their home, Kauśāmbī.

Udayana is later captured by Pradyota, the King of Ujjayinī. Here, he teaches the lute to Pradyota's daughter, Vāsavadattā, and they fall in love. Eventually they escape to Kauśāmbī, where Udayana's rightful kingship is restored, and they are married. But fearing Udayana is getting soft, and desiring an additional political alliance, Udayana's ministers make him believe that Vāsavadattā is dead, and get him married to Padmāvati.

Though he is later reunited with Vāsavadattā, Udayana remains childless from both of his wives. Later, as a boon of Kubera or Lord Shiva per other sources, Vāsavadattā becomes pregnant with Naravāhanadatta (his name means "given by Kubera"), who is fated to become the emperor of the vidyādharas.

According to the Puranas, the 4 successors of Udayana were Vahināra, DanḍapāṇI, Niramitra and Kṣemaka.

== Accounts ==
Udayana, the romantic hero of the Svapnavāsavadattā, the Vina-Vasavadatta, the Pratijñā-Yaugandharāyaṇa and many other legends was a contemporary of Buddha and of Pradyota, the king of Avanti. The Kathāsaritsāgara contains a long account of his conquests. The Priyadarśikā narrates the event of his victory over the ruler of Kaliṅga and restoration of Dṛḍhavarman to the throne of Aṅga. The commentary on the Dhammapada describes the story of his marriage with Vāsavadattā or Vāsuladattā, the daughter of Pradyota, the king of Avanti. It also mentions about his two other consorts, Māgandiyā, daughter of a Kuru Brahmin and Sāmāvatī, the adopted daughter of the treasurer Ghosaka. The Milindapañho refers to a peasant girl Gopāla-mātā who became his wife. The Svapnavāsavadattā of Bhāsa mentions about another queen named Padmāvatī, a sister of king Darśaka of Magadha. The Priyadarśikā tells us about the marriage of Udayana with Āraṇyakā, the daughter of Dṛḍhavarman, the king of Aṅga. The Ratnavali narrates a story of romance between him and Sāgarikā, an attendant of his chief queen, Vāsavadattā. The name of his son by his chief queen is Bodhi.
