= Djelal Munif Bey =

Ottoman/Turkish diplomat (1871 - 1928)

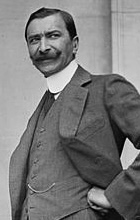
Djelal Munif Bey in 1914

Djelal Munif Bey (Turkish: Celal Münif Bey; 1871 - 1928) was an Ottoman diplomat who served at various posts including New York and Budapest. He was the Ottoman Consul General to the United States in New York. Although he was said to be murdered or committed suicide in September 1919 in Budapest, later it turned out to be that his wife committed suicide but he was alive. He was sent to New York for a second time to serve as the Turkish Consul General in 1926 and remained in this post for two years until his death on January 14, 1928.

== See also ==
- Ottoman Empire-United States relations
