= Indian classical drama =

Dramatic tradition of classical India

The term Indian classical drama refers to the tradition of dramatic literature and performance in ancient India. The roots of drama in the Indian subcontinent can be traced back to the Rigveda (1200-1500 BCE), which contains a number of hymns in the form of dialogues, or even scenes, as well as hymns that make use of other literary forms such as animal fables However, Indian drama begins its classical stage in the classical period with the composition of the Nātyaśāstra (lit. The Science of Drama). Indian classical drama is regarded as the highest achievement of Sanskrit literature.

The Buddhist playwright, poet and philosopher Asvaghosa, who composed the Buddhacarita, is considered to have been one of the first Sanskrit dramatists along with Bhāsa, who likely lived in the 2nd century BCE, and is famous for writing two of the only surviving tragedies in Sanskrit drama.

Despite its name, a classical Sanskrit drama uses both Sanskrit and Prakrit languages giving it a bilingual nature. Sanskrit drama utilised stock characters, such as the hero (nayaka), heroine (nayika), or clown (vidusaka). Actors may have specialised in a particular type. Mahābhāṣya by Patañjali contains the earliest reference to what may have been the seeds of Sanskrit drama. This treatise on grammar provides a feasible date for the beginnings of theatre in India.

Kālidāsa in the 4th-5th century CE, was arguably one of ancient India's greatest Sanskrit dramatists. Three famous romantic plays written by Kālidāsa are the Mālavikāgnimitram (Mālavikā and Agnimitra), Vikramōrvaśīyam (Pertaining to Vikrama and Urvashi), and Abhijñānaśākuntalam (The Recognition of Shakuntala). The last was inspired by a story in the Mahabharata and is the most famous. It was the first to be translated into English and German. Śakuntalā (in English translation) influenced Goethe's Faust (1808–1832). The next great Indian dramatist was Bhavabhuti (c. 7th century CE). He is said to have written the following three plays: Malati-Madhava, Mahaviracharita and Uttararamacarita. Among these three, the last two cover between them the entire epic of Ramayana. The powerful Indian emperor Harsha (606–648) is credited with having written three plays: the comedy Ratnavali, Priyadarsika, and the Buddhist drama Nagananda. Other famous Sanskrit dramatists include Śhudraka, Bhasa, and Asvaghosa. Though numerous plays written by these playwrights are still available, little is known about the authors themselves.

== Beginnings ==
The roots of Indian drama go back to the Rigveda, which contains a number of dialogues, acts and scenes, as well as literary devices such as animal fables and riddles. In many Vedic rituals, musical instruments like the flute and lyre are invariably used Shatapatha Brahmana (~800–700 BCE) has verses in chapter 13.2 written in the form of a play between two actors. Early Buddhist literature provides the earliest evidence for the existence of Indian theatre. The Pali suttas (ranging in date from the 5th to 3rd centuries BCE) refer to the existence of troupes of actors (led by a chief actor), who performed dramas on a stage. It is indicated that these dramas incorporated dance, but were listed as a distinct form of performance, alongside dancing, singing, and story recitations. (Note: According to later Buddhist texts, King Bimbisara (a contemporary of Gautama Buddha) had a drama performed for another king. This would be as early as the 5th century BCE, but the event is only described in much later texts, from the 3rd-4th centuries CE.)

A terracotta mask that was likely used in theatrical performances was excavated in Chirand, Bihar. Stratigraphical analysis dates the find to the 3rd or 4th century BCE, thus making it likely that theatre in India was fairly developed during this time. It is broad enough to have been worn comfortably on the nose, and the actor can easily see through the perforated nose. Bharatamuni mentions Pratishirsha in his Natyashastra, and these masks were likely full-headed masks with diadems and appropriate hair style appendages.

Some of the earliest-surviving fragments of Sanskrit drama date from c.200 BCE. The Mahābhāṣya by Patañjali contains the earliest reference to what may have been the seeds of classical Sanskrit drama. This treatise on grammar from the 2nd century BCE provides a feasible date for the beginnings of theatre in India.

Since the time of Alexander the Great, the Indian subcontinent came into direct contact with Greek culture. This has led to a scholarly debate about how much influence Ancient Greek drama had upon the development of Indian theatre.

== Theory ==
=== Natya Shastra ===
A major source of evidence for Sanskrit theatre is A Treatise on Theatre (Nātyaśāstra), a compendium whose date of composition is uncertain (estimates range from 200 BCE to 200 CE) and whose authorship is attributed to Bharata Muni. The Treatise is the most complete work of dramaturgy in the ancient world. It addresses acting, dance, music, dramatic construction, architecture, costuming, make-up, props, the organisation of companies, the audience, competitions, and offers a mythological account of the origin of theatre. In doing so, it provides indications about the nature of actual theatrical practices. Sanskrit theatre was performed on sacred ground by priests who had been trained in the necessary skills (dance, music, and recitation) in an hereditary process. Its aim was both to educate and to entertain.

Under the patronage of royal courts, performers belonged to professional companies that were directed by a stage manager (sutradhara), who may also have acted. This task was thought of as being analogous to that of a puppeteer—the literal meaning of "sutradhara" is "holder of the strings or threads". The performers were trained rigorously in vocal and physical technique. There were no prohibitions against female performers; companies were all-male, all-female, and of mixed gender. Certain sentiments were considered inappropriate for men to enact, however, and were thought better suited to women. Some performers played characters their own age, while others played characters younger or older than themselves. Of all the elements of theatre, the Treatise gives most attention to acting (abhinaya), which consists of two styles: realistic (lokadharmi) and conventional (natyadharmi), though the major focus is on the latter.

== Plays ==
=== Mricchakatika (The Little Clay Cart) ===
One of the earliest known Sanskrit plays, this play was composed by Śudraka in the 2nd century BC. Rife with romance, sex, royal intrigue and comedy, the juicy plot of the play has numerous twists and turns. The main story is about a young man named Charudatta, and his love for Vasantasena, a rich courtesan or nagarvadhu. The love affair is complicated by a royal courtier, who is also attracted to Vasantasena. The plot is further complicated by thieves and mistaken identities, and thus making it a greatly hilarious and entertaining play. It invited widespread admiration when staged in New York in 1924. The play was made into a 1984 Hindi movie Utsav, directed by Girish Karnad. The Indian play depicted in the 2001 film Moulin Rouge! may have been based on The Little Clay Cart.

=== Bhāsa ===
The plays written by Bhāsa were known to historians only through the references of later writers, as the manuscripts themselves were lost. Manuscripts of 13 plays written by him were discovered in an old library in Thiruvananthapuram (Trivandrum) in 1913 by the scholar Ganapati Sastri. A 14th play was later discovered and attributed to Bhāsa, but its authorship is disputed.

Bhāsa's most famous plays are Svapnavasavadattam (Swapnavāsadatta) ("Vasavadatta's dream"), Pancharātra, and Pratijna Yaugandharayaanam ("The vows of Yaugandharayana"). Some other plays being Pratimanātaka, Abhishekanātaka, Bālacharita, Dūtavākya, Karnabhāra, Dūtaghatotkacha, Chārudatta, Madhyamavyāyoga and Ūrubhaṅga.

Karnabharam is a critically acclaimed play and it is being subjected to lot of experimentation by the modern theatre groups in India.

Bhāsa is considered to be one of the best Sanskrit playwrights, second only to Kalidasa. He is earlier than Kalidasa and is dated to the 3rd or 4th century CE.

=== Kālidāsa ===
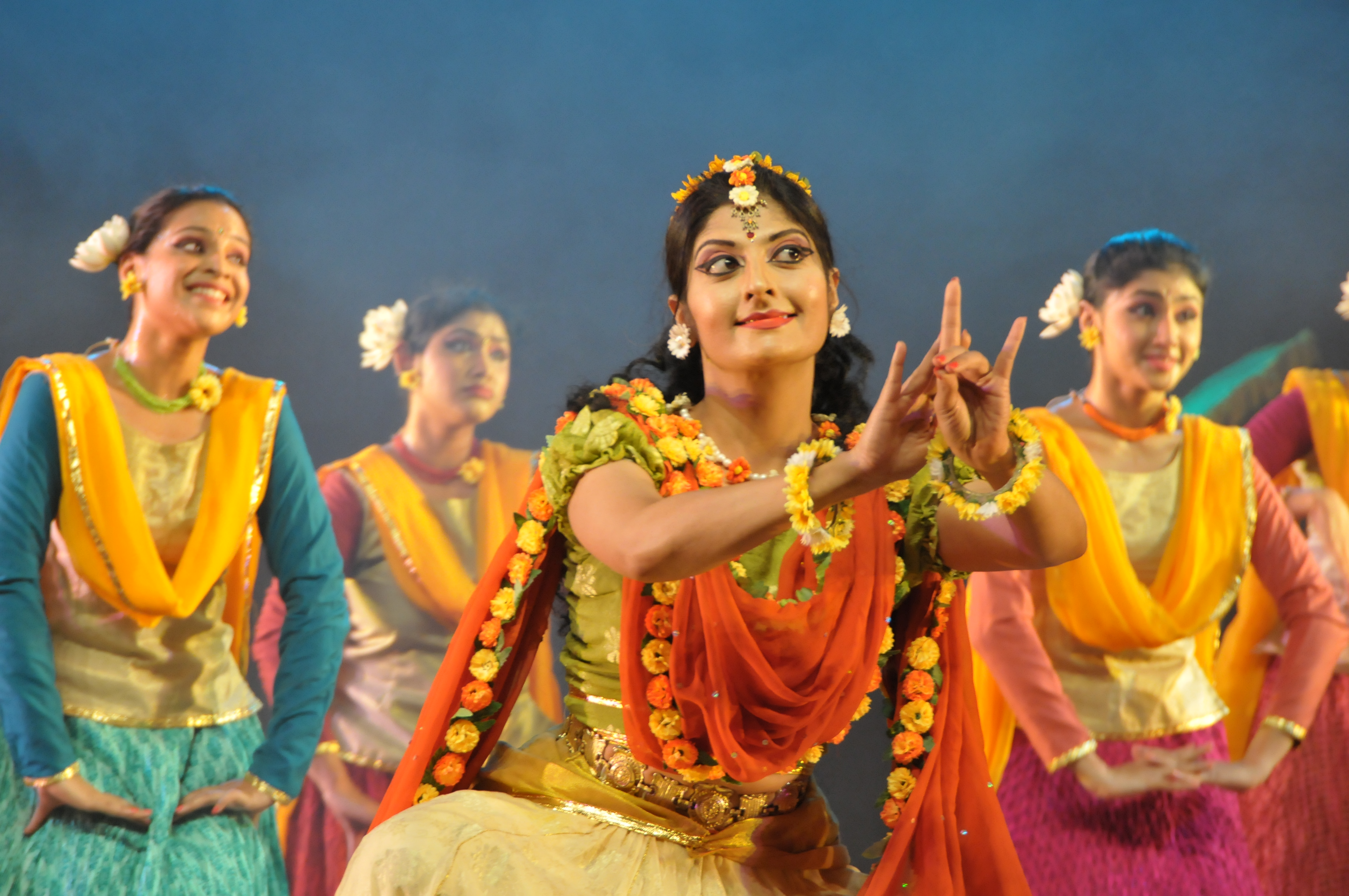
A performance of the play Shakuntala

Kālidāsa (4th-5th century CE) is easily the greatest poet and playwright in Sanskrit, and occupies the same position in Sanskrit literature that Shakespeare occupies in English literature. He deals primarily with famous Hindu legends and themes; three famous plays by Kālidāsa are Vikramōrvaśīyam ("Vikrama and Urvashi"), Mālavikāgnimitram ("Malavika and Agnimitra"), and the play that he is most known for: Abhijñānaśākuntalam ("The Recognition of Shakuntala"). The last named play is considered to be greatest play in Sanskrit. More than a millennium later, it would so powerfully impress the famous German writer Goethe that he would write:

Wouldst thou the young year's blossoms and the fruits of its decline
And all by which the soul is charmed, enraptured, feasted, fed,
Wouldst thou the earth and heaven itself in one sole name combine?
I name thee, O Sakuntala! and all at once is said.

— translation by Edward Backhouse Eastwick

Kālidāsa also wrote two large epic poems, Raghuvaṃśa ("The Genealogy of Raghu") and Kumārasambhava ("Birth of Kumara"), and two smaller epics, Ṛitusaṃhāra ("Medley of Seasons") and Meghadūta (The Cloud Messenger), another 'perfect' work.

Kālidāsa's writing is characterized by the usage of simple but beautiful Sanskrit, and by his extensive use of similes. His similes have earned him the saying, Upama Kalidasasya (Kālidāsa owns simile). The full śloka reads: upamā Kālidāsasya, Bhāraver artha gauravam | Daṇḍinah padalālityam, Māghe shanti trayoguṇah ||

=== Mudrarakshasa ===
Amongst Sanskrit plays, the historical play Mudrarakshasa by Vishakhadatta is unique because it contains political intrigue and is full of life, action and sustained interest. The time period of composition is prior to 800 C.E. In the play, Chandragupta Maurya is ruling from Pataliputra, having deposed the last of the Nanda kings. Rakshasa the minister of Nanda, attempts to avenge his late master. Chanakya, the minister of Chandragupta succeeds in winning over Rakshasa to his master's side.

=== Other major plays and playwrights ===
Other great plays include Ratnavali, Nagananda and Priyadarsika by Sri Harsha (7th century CE), Mahendra Vikram Varman Mattavilasa Prahasana, Shakti Bhadra's Āścaryacūḍāmaṇi, Kulasekhara's Subhadra Dhananjaya and Tapatisamvarana, Neelakanta's Kalyana Saugandhika and Sri Krishna Charita.

Bhavabhuti (8th century) is one of the great playwrights after Kalidasa. Other major Sanskrit playwrights include Visakhadatta, Bhaṭṭa Nārāyaṇa, Murari, Rajasekhara, Kshemisvara, Damodaramishra, and Krishnamishra.

== Performances ==
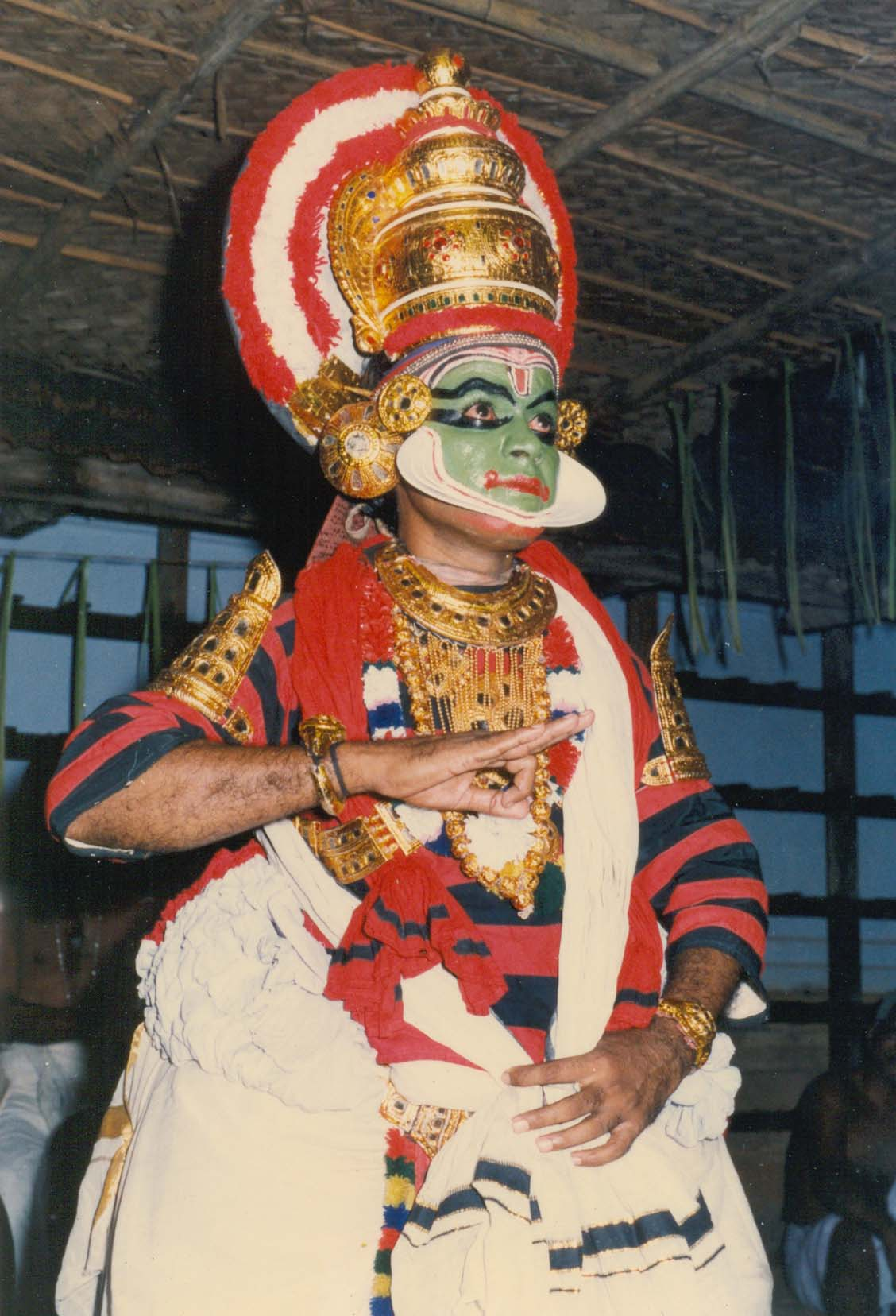
A Koodiyattam performance of Bhasa's Swapnavasavadattam

Sanskrit plays were very popular and were staged in ancient times all over India. Now the only surviving ancient Sanskrit drama theatre is Koodiyattam, which is preserved in Kerala by the Chakyar community. This form of Sanskrit drama is thought to be at least 2000 years old and is one of the oldest living theatrical traditions in the world. All major Sanskrit plays such as that of Bhasa, Sri Harsha, Shakti Bhadra etc. are performed in Koodiyattam. Guru Nātyāchārya Vidūshakaratnam Padma Shri Māni Mādhava Chākyār choreographed and directed plays like Kalidasa's Abhijñānaśākuntala, Vikramorvaśīya and Mālavikāgnimitra; Bhasa's Swapnavāsadatta and Pancharātra for the first time in the history of Koodiyattam. He popularised Koodiyattam and rejuvenated the only surviving Sanskrit drama theatre in India.

One of the hypotheses (as yet without consensus) of the origins of the "Trivandrum plays" of Bhasa is that these 13 plays were adapted from their original sources and brought to Kerala for choreography in the Koodiyattam tradition.

== Modern Sanskrit plays ==
Manmohan Acharya, a modern Sanskrit playwright has written many plays and dance dramas. Some worth-mentioning plays are Arjuna-Pratijnaa, Shrita-kamalam, Pada-pallavam, Divya-Jayadevam, Pingalaa, Mrtyuh, Sthitaprajnah, Tantra-mahasaktih, Purva-sakuntalam, Uttara-sakuntalam and Raavanah.

Vidyadhar Shastri wrote three Sanskrit plays viz. Purnanandam, Kalidainyam and Durbala Balam.

Prafulla Kumar Mishra has written the plays Chitrangada and Karuna.

== See also ==
- Classical Indian musical theatre
- Urubhanga
- Malayalam drama

== Sources ==
- Banham, Martin, ed. 1998. The Cambridge Guide to Theatre. Cambridge: Cambridge UP. ISBN 0-521-43437-8.
- Brandon, James R. 1981. Introduction. In Baumer and Brandon (1981, xvii-xx).
- ---, ed. 1997. The Cambridge Guide to Asian Theatre.' 2nd, rev. ed. Cambridge: Cambridge UP. ISBN 978-0-521-58822-5.
- Brockett, Oscar G. and Franklin J. Hildy. 2003. History of the Theatre. Ninth edition, International edition. Boston: Allyn and Bacon. ISBN 0-205-41050-2.
- Baumer, Rachel Van M., and James R. Brandon, eds. 1981. Sanskrit Theatre in Performance. Delhi: Motilal Banarsidass, 1993. ISBN 978-81-208-0772-3.
- Arthur Anthony Macdonell (1900). "The drama" . A History of Sanskrit Literature. New York: D. Appleton and company.
- Richmond, Farley. 1998. "India." In Banham (1998, 516–525).
- Richmond, Farley P., Darius L. Swann, and Phillip B. Zarrilli, eds. 1993. Indian Theatre: Traditions of Performance. U of Hawaii P. ISBN 978-0-8248-1322-2.
