= T. Ganapati Sastri =

Indian scholar

Mahamahopadhyaya T. Gaṇapati Śāstrī (1860–1926) was a Sanskrit scholar who was editor of the Trivandrum Sanskrit Series, and discovered the plays of Bhasa. He was also the principal of the Sanskrit college for some time, around 1903. His father's name is Ramasubba Iyer. He was born at Taruvai in Tirunelveli District in 1860 A.D

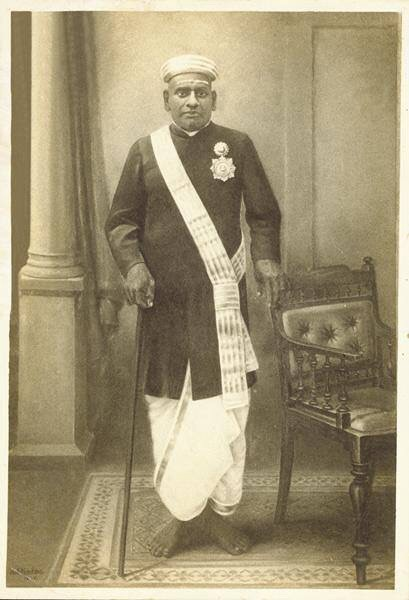
T. Ganapati Sastri

While touring Kerala searching for Sanskrit manuscripts, he came across a palm-leaf codex in Malayalam in a village near Trivandrum. Although they carried no name, he deduced based on internal evidence that they were by the same author, and concluded that they were the lost plays of Bhasa. This produced a sensation in the scholarly world, and Ganapati Sastri's work was widely applauded. This has been considered "the most important event in the twentieth century Sanskrit literary scholarship".

He was involved in bringing to light several other Sanskrit works as well. He discovered and edited the Trivandrum edition of the Arthashastra in 1924–25, with a Sanskrit commentary by himself. He pointed out that the name was more likely Kauṭalya, which has since been supported by other scholars. Sastri, was awarded the degree of Doctor of Philosophy by University of Tübingen, Germany for his edition of Bhasa plays.

He also wrote Bharatanuvarnana, a history of India.

Sastri's contribution to architectural text is notable. His presentation of MayaMata is one of the rare texts to be found on the ancient Vedic text. His work has been further translated, interpreted and built upon by many authors, including Bruno Dagens.

He is known to have read and mastered 4 vedas. There is a family legend about him which was passed down from generations to generations within his family. According to that, there was one such time when he actually called upon one of Saptha Kannis to earth.

== Life ==
His father's name is Ramasubba Iyer. He was born at Taruvai in Tirunelveli District in 1860 A.D

- At the age of 17 he composed the drama Madhavivasanta.
- In 1878 he joined the Travancore service.
- 1889 he became a professor in Sanskrit college, Trivandrum, and later became its principal.
- 1908 he became the curator of the Oriental Manuscripts Library.
- 1918 he became Mahamahopadhyaya
- 1924 he received an honorary Ph.D. of University of Tübingen
- Died in 1926.

== His works ==
- 'Srimulacarita' about history of Travancore
- 'Bharatavarnana' describes India.
- 'Tulapurusadana'
- Aparnastava - Stotra on Goddess Parvati.
- Cakravarttini gunamanimala on Queen Victoria

...

== Sources ==
- Venkatachalam, V. (1986), Bhāsa, Sahitya Akademi
- Taruvāgrahārām Gaṇapatiśāstrī; Bhāsa (1985), Bhāsa's plays: a critical study (reprint ed.), Bharatiya Vidya Prakashan
