= Kādambarī =

7th century Sanskrit literature. novel by Banabhatta

Kādambarī is a romantic novel in Sanskrit. It was substantially composed by Bāṇabhaṭṭa in the first half of the 7th century CE, who did not survive to see it through completion. The novel was completed by Banabhatta's son Bhushanabhatta, according to the plan laid out by his late father. It is conventionally divided into Purvabhaga (earlier part) written by Banabhatta, and Uttarabhaga (latter part) by Bhushanabhatta. (An alternate tradition gives the son's name as Pulindabhatta.)

The standard editions of the original Sanskrit text are by Peterson and Kane. There are translations into English by Kale, Layne and Ridding; and an abridgement into Gujarati by Bhalan (edited by Keshavlal Dhruv).

This novel has an extremely intricate plot which is difficult to summarize concisely. Its central thread is that of a romantic attachment (and eventual union) between the hero Chandrapeeda and the heroine Kadambari. However, there are several competing subplots; indeed, the heroine does not make her appearance until past the midpoint. Many of the characters appear in multiple incarnations, some as humans and some as demigods or animals. The narration proceeds in a succession of nested frames; a large part of it is a retelling by a parrot of a story which was told to it by a sage. The latter story also contains several instances of one character relating a sub-story to another character.

The plot has probably been adapted from the story of King Sumanas from Gunadhya's Brihatkatha (a conjectural collection of stories in the extinct Paishachi language). This story also appears in Somadeva's Kathasaritsagara (which is believed to be a Sanskrit precis of Gunadhya's work).

Apart from the Kadambari, Banabhatta is also the author of Harshacharita, a biography of his patron king Harshavardhana. It is this circumstance which allows one to date the author with a reasonable degree of certainty.

== Plot synopsis ==
(The paragraphs have been numbered for ease of reference. The original text is continuous, and has no chapter divisions. The Purvabhaga (first part) ends abruptly inside Paragraph 16, at a point when Kadambari is speaking about her love-sickness to Patralekha, as narrated by the latter to Chandrapeeda.)

1. There is a valiant king named Shudraka, who rules over a vast and prosperous kingdom with the capital city of Vidisha. One day, a Chandala (ചണ്ടാല, चाण्डाल) maiden comes to his court and makes a present of a parrot (named Vaishampayana) to the king. After having (eating) some tasty morsels and rested in the royal chambers, the parrot begins to narrate his tale with the preamble, "Your Majesty, this is a very long story; but if you are curious, it will be told."
2. The parrot says that he used to live in the Vindhya forest with his aging father. One day, the forest is overrun by Shabaras (शबर) (a band of hunters) who kill an enormous number of animals and cause great destruction. Vaishampayana's father is dragged from his hollow and murdered. After the commotion has died out, Vaishampayana wanders off, and eventually finds refuge in a hermitage where he meets the divine sage Jabali. The latter stares at the parrot for a while and remarks that "He is experiencing the fruit of his own misbehaviour." The other hermits become curious at this remark, and Jabali begins to narrate the tale which fills a large part of the 'Kadambari'.
3. Jabali says that in the country of Avanti, there was a city called Ujjayini which was ruled by King Tharapeeda. He had wealth, vitality, spiritual knowledge, and a large harem, but no son (अनपत्यता). One night, the king dreams that Chandra (चन्द्र, the Moon God) had entered the mouth of his queen Vilasavati. He relates this dream to his chief minister Shukanasha, who in turn confides that in his dream, a figure clad in white placed a Pundarika (पुण्डरीक, lotus) into the lap of his wife Manorama.
4. Within a few days, both wives are found to be pregnant, and each of them gives birth to a boy. Tarapeeda's son is named Chandrapeeda, and Shukanasha's son is named Vaishampayana (वैशम्बायन:). The two boys, who become bosom friends, are raised together in a heavily fortified university built especially for them. Chandrapeeda acquires a powerful and swift horse called Indrayudha (इन्द्रायुधः), which becomes his inseparable companion.
5. Having completed their education, the two friends reenter the capital city. There are boisterous celebrations at their return, and Chandrapeeda is ogled at by throngs of besotted young women. Queen Vilasavati makes a present of a beautiful prepubescent girl named Patralekha (पत्रलेखा) to her son. Tarapeeda decides to install his son as the heir-apparent. Shukanasha gives him some worldly advice, after which, Chandrapeeda and Vaishampayana, accompanied by a vast army, set forth to conquer the world.
6. Chandrapeeda subdues all the princes in the world, and decides to settle for a temporary rest at Suvarnapura in the Himalayas. One day, while riding his horse, he sees a couple of Kinnaras (किन्नरः, a race of demigods), and gives a chase. They elude him however, and the prince gets lost. He finds himself at the bank of the beautiful lake Acchoda. Having quenched his thirst, he hears a sweet melody and begins to look for its source. It is found to originate from the Veena ( वीणा, lute) of a heavenly and lustrous damsel dressed as an ascetic, sitting in a temple of Lord Shiva (शिव).
7. The damsel, named Mahashveta (महाश्वेत), offers hospitality to Chandrapeeda. He insists that she should narrate her story. Mahashveta begins the narration in a gush of tears with the words, " O Prince, what is to be gained by hearing my story of my renunciation of the world? But if you are eager to know, I shall narrate it for you."
8. Mahashveta relates that she is the daughter of a Gandharva (गन्धर्वः, a demigod). One day, she had come to Lake Acchoda for a bath, when she spotted a handsome young ascetic and was instantly smitten. An enticing smell seemed to emanate from his body. The ascetic, too, appeared to be overwhelmed by passion. She approaches a second young sage (named Kapinjala), who tells her that her object of infatuation is named Pundarika. He is the son of Lakshmi (Goddess of Wealth) who had conceived him while sitting on a lotus, by merely looking at the great sage Shvetaketu (श्वेतकेतु). One day, as Kapinjala and Pundarika were wandering in the Nandana forest, the goddess of the forest presented a fresh mango sprout to Pundarika as an ornament for his ear. It is this sprout which is the source of this smell.
9. Pundarika removes the sprout from Pundarika's ear, and places it onto Mahashveta's ear. His rosary falls down, as he is trembling from the pleasure of touching her cheek. Mahashveta wears it around her neck. Kapinjala scolds Pundarika for succumbing to such a mean passion, contrary to his calling as an ascetic. Pundarika feels abashed, and asks for his rosary back in mock-anger. Since Pundarika is visibly befuddled due to his passion, Mahashveta deceives him by giving him her strand of pearls instead of the rosary.
10. They part company, and that night Mahashveta is driven senseless by her love-sickness. Her beetle-box bearer Taralika mentions to her that she was approached by Pundarika, who enquired about her mistress. He has given a love-letter for Mahashveta written on the bark of a tree using the juice of a leaf as ink. Mahashveta loses her mind after reading it, when the arrival of Kapinjala is announced. The latter reports that Pundarika is driven to the brink of his existence by his passion for Mahashveta, and henceforth his life is in her hands.
11. After Kapinjala has departed, Mahashveta is tormented and falls into a swoon. As the moon rises, she leaves her palace to meet Pundarika. However, she hears Kapinjala's wailing from a distance, who tells her that Pundarika is dead. Mahashveta is heart-broken, and prepares to immolate herself on the funeral pyre. At this moment, a divine being descends from the skies and carries aloft Pundarika's body. He admonishes Mahashveta not to give up her life, and reassures her that "You two will be reunited." Kapinjala is agitated, and flies away himself in pursuit of this being. Mahashveta believes herself to be responsible for Pundarika's death. She has given up all worldly pleasures, and is now an ascetic. This ends Mahashveta's narrative, begun in Paragraph 7.
12. Chandrapeeda consoles Mahashveta and advises her not to blame herself. He enquires after her companion Taralika. Mahashveta explains: The Gandharva king Chitraratha and his queen Madira have a daughter named Kadambari, who has been a childhood companion to me. She is filled with despair due to my plight, and has vowed not to marry as long as I am in grief. Kadambari's parents are vexed by this decision of hers, and have asked me to persuade her. Thus, immediately before your arrival here, I have sent Taralika to deliver my message to Kadambari.
13. The very next day, Taralika returns along with a young Gandharva named Keyuraka. The latter says that Kadambari was very upset by the message and is firmly decided against marrying while Mahashveta's bereavement continues. Mahashveta decides to visit Kadambari herself, accompanied by Chandrapeeda. They visit Mount Hemaketu (the Gandharvas' dwelling). Immediately after Chandrapeeda and Kadambari have seen each other, the two are utterly in love.
14. Mahashveta importunes Kadambari that she should let Chandrapeeda return to his place, since his companions must be anxious about him. Chandrapeeda returns, and is reunited with Vaishampayana, Patralekha and his army. The next day, he is trailed by Keyuraka who brings the message that Kadambari is suffering from pangs of separation.
15. Chandrapeeda, immediately mounts his horse Indrayudha, and accompanied by Patralekha, speeds away towards Kadambari. Kadambari is growing pale from desire. Chandrapeeda coyly offers to cure her by suggesting that his body is at her service, but Kadambari demurs. As Chandrapeeda is about to leave, Kadambari requests that Patralekha be left behind as her companion. This is agreed to, and Chandrapeeda returns to his camp.
16. He receives a letter from his father Tarapeeda complaining of his prolonged absence and requesting his immediate return to the kingdom. Chandrapeeda sends a messenger to Kadambari, leaves Vaishampayana in charge of the slowly returning army and marches rapidly onwards towards the capital. In a few days he reaches Ujjayini. Along the way he comes across a Chandika temple and witnesses the antics of a very eccentric shrivelled Dravida ascetic. (This part seems to have been composed merely for amusement, and has no connection with the later narrative.) Chandrapeeda's parents and the citizens are delighted to see him. In a few days, Patralekha brings news that Kadambari is suffering exceedingly from love-sickness.
17. Keyuraka arrives shortly thereafter, confirming this description of Kadambari. Chandrapeeda's own state of mind is quite the same. He decides to solicit the help of his friend Vaishampayana. He goes forth and meets his returning army, but hears the following strange account from his generals: while the army was camped at Lake Acchoda, Vaishampayana went into a state of trance and seemed to be searching for something. He now refuses to be separated from the lake.
18. Chandrapeeda becomes anxious for his friend and sets out in search of him, having taken leave of his parents. However, he finds no trace of Vaishampayana at Lake Acchoda. He meets Mahashveta however, who narrates the following story. She saw a young Brahmin wandering about, who made passionate advances of love towards her. She was inflamed by anger, and cursed him that he would turn into a parrot. That very moment he fell lifeless on the ground. It was only later that she learnt that the youth was Chandrapeeda's friend Vaishampayana.
19. Chandrapeeda is rendered unconscious by this news. At this moment, Kadambari (who has told her parents that she is leaving to see Mahashveta), arrives at the scene, accompanied by Patralekha. They both fall into a swoon after seeing Chandrapeeda lying on the ground. When Kadambari recovers, still thinking that Chandrapeeda is dead, she prepares to immolate herself on his funeral pyre.
20. At this moment, a disembodied voice calls out from the sky: 'My child Mahashveta, the body of Pundarika is in my world. He remains imperishable until he unites with you. On the other hand, although Chandrapeeda's soul has fled because of a curse; his body is made of light, and thus forever imperishable. Kadambari must see to it that his body is carefully guarded.' Everyone is astonished. Patralekha exclaims that it is not proper for Indrayudha to remain on earth while his master is no more. She mounts him, and throws herself along with the horse into the Acchoda lake.
21. The very next moment, Kapinjala emerges from the lake. Mahashveta is delighted to see her lover Pundarika's friend, and is curious to know his tale. Kapinjala narrates as follows: I chased the heavenly being who had carried aloft Pundarika's body (Paragraph 11) to the moon world. This being declared himself to be the Moon God.
22. The latter said to Kapinjala: ' I was once cursed by your friend (Pundarika) for no sound reason, that I would suffer from unrequited love more than once. I cursed him back saying that he would share my agonies. However, once I discovered that he is the lover of Mahashveta (who has a kinship with my race), I brought his body here to preserve it. You (Kapinjala) should go and consult the sage Shvetaketu (Paragraph 8) about seeking his son's deliverance.'
23. Kapinjala continues: 'As I hurled myself towards Shvetaketu, I inadvertently ran over an irascible sage who cursed me that I would become a horse. I implored his pardon. The sage relented and said that the curse would only last until my rider was alive. I further requested him that even as a horse, I should not be separated from my friend Pundarika. Thereupon, the sage told me that the Moon God would be born upon the earth as Tarapeeda's son, who would be my rider. Pundarika would be reborn as the chief minister's son and a companion to my rider. After hearing this, I fell into the ocean below, and reemerged as a horse.
24. Since I had retained memories of my past life even after having turned into a horse, I purposefully brought Chandrapeeda here in pursuit of the Kinnara couple. Vaishampayana, the youth cursed by you (Mahashveta), was in fact Pundarika himself in his earlier birth.' This closes the narration of Kapinjala begun in Paragraph 21. Mahashveta is heartbroken at the fact that she has lost her lover for a second time.
25. Kadambari enquires after Patralekha who had entered the lake with the horse. However, Kapinjala knows nothing about this, and he leaps into the sky to meet Shvetaketu. Kadambari whiles away her time watching over Chandrapeeda's lifeless body, which shows no signs of decay.
26. A messenger sent by Kadambari informs Chandrapeeda's parents of their son's plight. Tarapeeda, Vilasavati, Shukanasa and Manorama arrive at the scene, and are very sorrowful. Tarapeeda gives up all worldly pleasures, and begins to spend his days in the forest near his son's body. Jabali reveals that Vaishampayana (who was cursed by Mahashveta) is the very parrot who is present in the hermitage with them. This ends the narrative of Jabali, begun in Paragraph 2.
27. The parrot Vaishampayana continues his narration. He says: 'After Jabali had finished, all of my past life came back to me. I requested him to tell me something of my friend Chandrapeeda's present birth, but he was dismissive. Jabali told me that although as Pundarika I was an ascetic; I came under the pall of sensual desire, because I was born only of a woman's seed (Paragraph 8) and hence lacked the requisite element of manliness.
28. After the assembly in Jabali's hermitage has broken up for the night, I (the parrot) became sorrowful at my own degradation from the state of an ascetic Brahmin to that of an animal. At the very moment, the sage Kapinjala arrived at the hermitage. He embraced me and wept with joy. Kapinjala told me (the parrot): 'I have met your father Shvetaketu, who directed me here. Your woes are about to end.' Afterwards, Kapinjala left the hermitage.
29. Eventually, my wings grew stronger, and I could fly. I set off in the northern direction to meet Mahashveta. On my way I fell asleep due to fatigue, and when I woke up, found myself caught in a snare laid by a Chandala (forest-dweller). I was taken to a Chandala girl who said to me, "Ah my son! You cannot leave me now." Then she brought me here in a golden cage, and made a present of myself to you (King Shudraka). I do not know who this girl is, and why she calls me her son.' This ends the narration of the parrot (begun in Paragraph 1).
30. King Shudraka becomes curious and summons the Chandala girl. The girl tells the king that she is Lakshmi, Pundarika's mother (Paragraph 8). Moreover, the king is no other than Chandrapeeda (the Moon God). The mutual curses between the Moon and Pundarika are now at an end. At these words, the king remembers everything in his former life, and slumps in a state of love-sickness for Kadambari.
31. At Mahashveta's hermitage, the season of spring arrives gloriously. Chandrapeeda is brought back to life by the touch of Kadambari's hand. He says that since the curse is over, he has abandoned the earthly body of Shudraka. Pundarika appears from heaven in the form in which Mahashveta had fallen in love with him. Both the couples are united. The parents of all the lovers gather around them, and everyone is overcome with joy.
32. One day, Kadambari asks Chandrapeeda about Patralekha's whereabouts. Chandrapeeda tells her that Patralekha is in fact Rohini (a demigoddess and a spouse of the Moon) who had come to the mortal world to take care of Chandrapeeda during his curse. Kadambari and Chandrapeeda enjoy their first sexual union. Chandrapeeda returns to Ujjayini, and installs Pundarika as the King. He divides his days between Ujjayini and Mount Hemaketu. The two couples live in eternal happiness.

== Editions and translations ==
- (1896) C. M. Ridding, The Kādambarī of Bāṇa. Translated, with Occasional Omissions, And Accompanied by a Full Abstract of the Continuation of the Romance by the Author’s Son Bhūshaṇabhaṭṭa.
- (1913) Kādambarī (Uttarabhāga) edited by P. V. Kane at the Internet Archive
- (1916: 5th edition) Kadambari - Purva Bagha at the Internet Archive
- (1928: 3rd edition) M. R. Kale, Sanskrit text and translation.
- (1991) Gwendolyn Layne, Kādambarī : a classic Sanskrit story of magical transformations, Garland Publishing, New York.
- (2009) David Smith, Princess Kadambari, Clay Sanskrit Library, ISBN 0-8147-4080-4
- (2010) Padmini Rajappa, Kadambari: Bana. Translated with an introduction, Penguin Books. ISBN 978-0-143-06466-4.

== Adaptations ==
It has been adapted into an Indian silent film, Mahashweta Kadambari (1922), by Shree Nath Patankar and an Indian Hindi-language film, Kadambari (1944), by Nandlal Jaswantlal.
