= Vidyadhara =

Mystical beings in Hinduism and Jainism

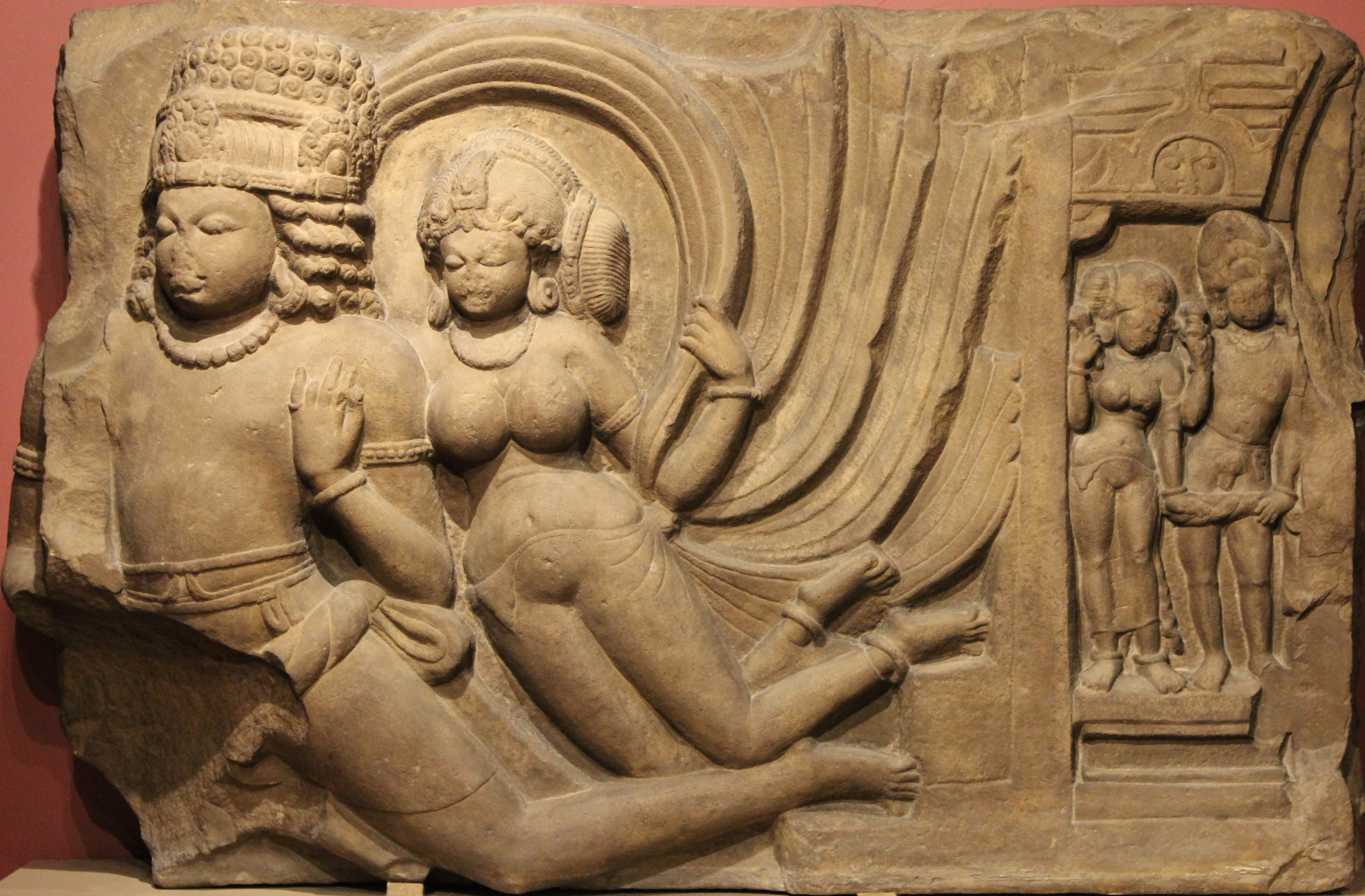
A Vidyadhara couple. Sondani, circa 525 CE.

Vidyadhara(s) (Sanskrit Vidyādhara, meaning "wisdom-holders") are a group of supernatural beings in Indian religions who possess magical powers. In Hinduism, they also attend Shiva, who lives in the Himalayas. They are considered Upadevas, or demi-gods.

== Iconography ==
=== Sondani relief ===
A buff sandstone doorframe fragment from Sondani, near Mandsaur, now in the National Museum, New Delhi, depicts a large flying celestial couple beside a smaller standing couple in an architectural niche. The museum record identifies the sculpture as Flying celestial and gives its accession number as 51.94.

Prithvi K. Agrawala described the same object as "a flying Gandharva couple and a standing Mithuna". The more general identification as a flying celestial or Vidyadhara-type figure is also possible, since celestial beings such as Vidyadharas, Gandharvas and Yakshas often overlap in Indian religious art.

The fragment has also been compared with Jain celestial and guardian imagery. Its architectural context as a doorframe may suggest an auspicious or protective threshold function, and Jain tradition includes yakshas and yakshis as subsidiary deities associated with Tirthankaras. The apparent nudity of the smaller standing pair may also recall the Digambara Jain visual language of the sky-clad body. However, because the fragment does not preserve a Tirthankara, inscription, or specific yaksha-yakshi attributes, a Jain identification remains only a possibility rather than a secure attribution.

== In Hinduism ==
=== In Hindu epics ===
In the Hindu epics, Vidyādharas are described as essentially spirits of the air. They are described as doing different activities in the epics like gazing at human prowess with astonishment, strewing flowers watching a combat, rejoicing with music and laughter, crowned with wreaths and fleeing with their wives from danger. They possess great magical powers like the ability to diminish their size. They are endowed with epithets describing them as "doers of good and devoted to joy". They also live in Gandhamandhana mountain and other Himalayan mountains with Kinnaras. They are also described residing on Mount Krauncha, on Citrakuta where Rama saw Vidyadhara women playing, in the hills of Malabar and in the Khandava forest. They are also seen in Kubera's court, headed by their leader Chakradharman and in Indra's palace under Vipracitti. A third leader of the Vidyadharas is described to the wise Jambavan. In the epic Mahabharata, Vidyadharas are described as following Indra with other semi-divine beings to the serpent-sacrifice of Janamejaya. In the epics, the women of the Vidyadharas, called Vidyadharis are described to possess great beauty, and were victims of kidnapping by demons like Ravana. In the Ramayana, Sundarkanda Verses 1.22 to 1.26 describe the plight of Vidyadharas and their women following the pressure exerted on Mount Mahendra by Hanuman while taking his position in his attempt to leapcross the ocean.

=== In Puranas and other texts ===
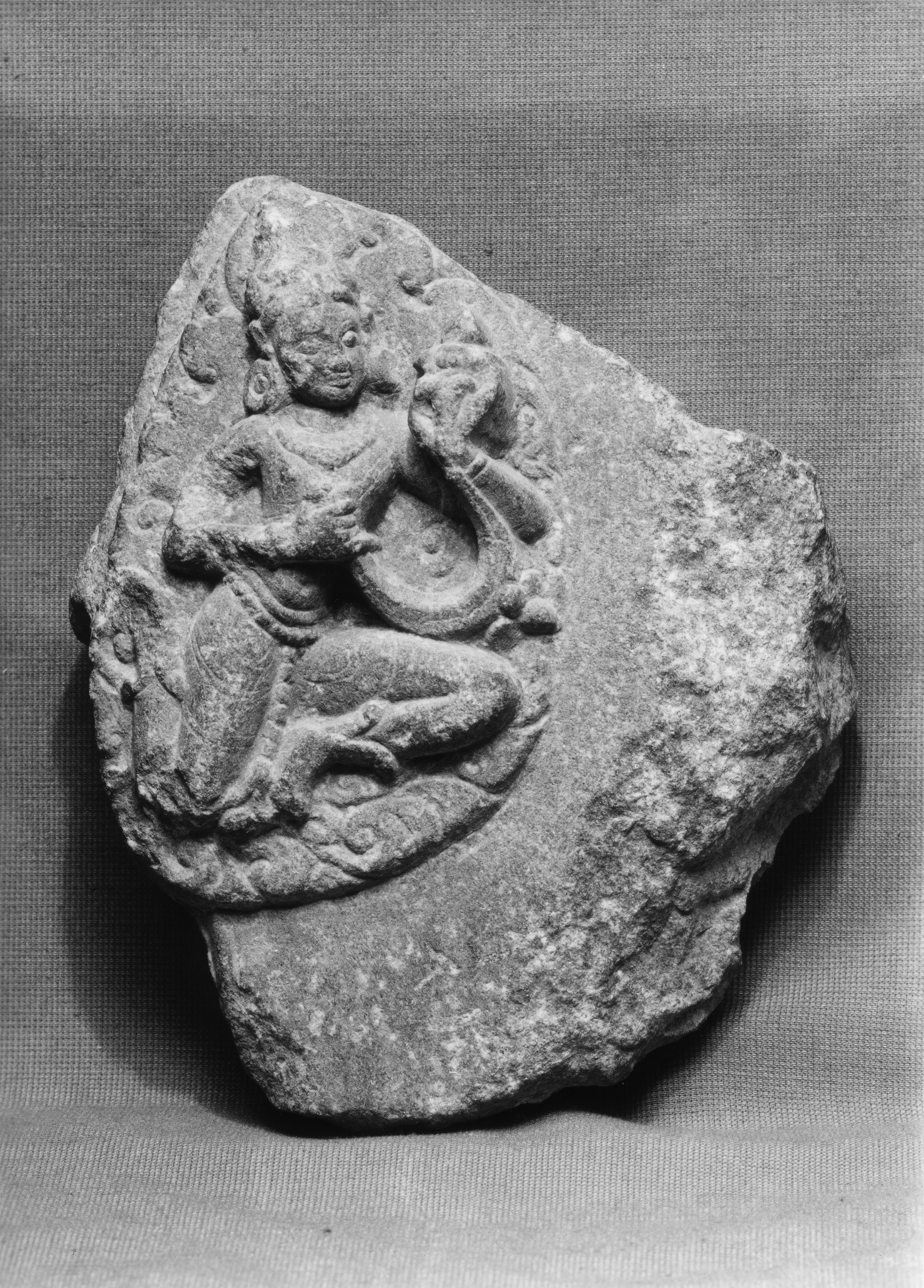
A flying Vidyadhara.

In Agni Purana, they are described as wearing garlands in the sky and mentioned with other semi-divine beings like Yakshas and Gandharvas.

In the Bhagavata Purana, Citraketu is described as the king of Vidyadharas. It also tells about a cursed Vidyadhara called Sudarshana. In various references in the Purana, they are coupled with other semi-divine beings, who pray to the god Vishnu for help or enumerated among the many creations of God. The Vidyadhras with siddhas are said to have milked Mother Earth (Prithvi), who had assumed the form of a cow, by using the sage Kapila as the calf and collected different yogic mystic powers (siddhis) and the art of flying as milk in the pot of the sky.

Gunadhya is said to have composed seven massive stories about Vidyadharas, then to have destroyed the first six stories when the king rejected them, retaining only the seventh story — of Naravahanadatta — which became the Brihatkatha written in Paishachi language. This work is not extant, but three adaptations exist in Sanskrit: Brhatkathamanjari by Kshemendra, Kathasaritsagara by Somadeva, and Bṛhatkathāślokasaṃgraha by Budhasvamin. The Kathasaritsagara presents some stories about Vidyadharas like Devadatta (a Brahmin boy who acquired Vidyadhara-hood), Jimutavahana, Muktaphalaketu and Naravahanadatta (who became an emperor of the Vidyadharas).

== In Jainism ==
Jain narrative texts describe Vidyadharas as human or semi-divine lineages who possess Vidyas, or special sciences and powers. In Jain versions of the Ramayana, the Vanaras and Rakshasas are not treated as literal monkeys and demons. They are explained as branches of the larger Vidyadhara dynasty, whose members possess Vidyas(powers) such as flying and other superhuman abilities.

Jain genealogies also preserve long lines of Vidyadhara kings after Nami and Vinami. The following table lists selected figures who have notable roles in Jain narrative literature.

| No. | Name | Period or story cycle | Clan or lineage | Vidyas or powers | Famous Jain story |
|---|---|---|---|---|---|
| 1 | Nami | Grandson of Adinath | Founder of the Vidyadhara Dynasty | Many vidyas, including sky-travel | Nami and Vinami receive kingdoms and vidyas from Dharanendra and become the first rulers of the Vidyadhara lineage. |
| 2 | Vinami | Grandson of Adinath | Founder of the Vidyadhara Dynasty | Many vidyas, including sky-travel | Vinami is paired with Nami as an early Vidyadhara ruler in Jain universal history. |
| 3 | Ratnamalin | Early Vidyadhara genealogy after Adinath | Vidyadhara lineage | Not individually named | Listed among the early Vidyadhara kings in Jain genealogical traditions. |
| 4 | Ratnavajra | Early Vidyadhara genealogy after Adinath | Vidyadhara lineage | Not individually named | One of the early kings in the Vidyadhara genealogy preserved in Jain Ramayana-related texts. |
| 5 | Ratnaratha | Early Vidyadhara genealogy after Adinath | Vidyadhara lineage | Not individually named | Included in the long Vidyadhara royal line that connects the first Vidyadhara rulers with later Jain Ramayana lineages. |
| 6 | Ratnacitra | Early Vidyadhara genealogy after Adinath | Vidyadhara lineage | Not individually named | Remembered as one of the early successors in the Vidyadhara royal genealogy. |
| 7 | Meghavahana | After Ajitanatha and before the main Jain Ramayana story | Vidyadhara king | General Vidyadhara powers | Installed as the first ruler of Lankapuri and Patalankarapura in the Jain account of early dynasties. |
| 8 | Srikantha | Before the main Jain Ramayana story | Vidyadhara king connected with Vanaradvipa | General Vidyadhara powers | Installed as the first king of Kiskindhipura, later connected with the Vanara lineage. |
| 9 | Amaraprabha | Before the main Jain Ramayana story | Descendant of Srikantha | General Vidyadhara powers | Establishes the Vanara lineage by adopting the monkey emblem for his state; this explains why the Vanaras are called “monkey” people in Jain tradition. |
| 10 | Asanivega | Before the main Jain Ramayana story | Vidyadhara ruler of Rathanupura connected with the Vanara line | General Vidyadhara powers | A Vidyadhara ruler involved in the early conflicts over Kiskindhipura and Lanka. |
| 11 | Indra | Before the main Jain Ramayana story | Vidyadhara king | General Vidyadhara powers | A powerful Vidyadhara king defeated by Ravana; he should not be confused with the heavenly god Indra. |
| 12 | Candragati | During the time of Munisuvrata; Jain Ramayana cycle | Khecara/Vidyadhara king of Rathanupura | General Vidyadhara powers | Finds and adopts Bhamandala, the lost brother of Sita, in the Jain Ramayana story. |
| 13 | Ravana | During the time of Munisuvrata; Jain Ramayana cycle | Rakshasa branch of the Vidyadharas | Mastery of various vidyas and magical warfare | A powerful Vidyadhara king of Lanka who abducts Sita. In Jain tradition, Ravana is killed by Lakshmana, not by Rama. |
| 14 | Vibhishana | During the time of Munisuvrata; Jain Ramayana cycle | Rakshasa branch of the Vidyadharas | General Vidyadhara powers | Opposes Ravana's conduct and joins Rama's side. |
| 15 | Kumbhakarna | During the time of Munisuvrata; Jain Ramayana cycle | Rakshasa branch of the Vidyadharas | General Vidyadhara powers | Brother of Ravana, born in the same Rakshasa Vidyadhara family. |
| 16 | Hanuman | During the time of Munisuvrata; Jain Ramayana cycle | Vanara branch of the Vidyadharas | Aerial movement and other heroic Vidyadhara abilities | Not a monkey in Jain tradition, but a heroic Vidyadhara of the Vanara clan who goes to Lanka and helps Rama find Sita. |
| 17 | Vali | During the time of Munisuvrata; Jain Ramayana cycle | Vanara branch of the Vidyadharas | General Vidyadhara powers | In the Jain narrative, Vali renounces the world; Ravana later tries to disturb him by lifting Mount Astapada but is defeated. |
| 18 | Sugriva | During the time of Munisuvrata; Jain Ramayana cycle | Vanara branch of the Vidyadharas | General Vidyadhara powers | Becomes ruler of the Vanara Vidyadharas and helps Rama search for Sita. |
| 19 | Indrajit | During the time of Munisuvrata; Jain Ramayana cycle | Rakshasa branch of the Vidyadharas | Magical warfare, including binding powers | Ravana's son, who uses supernatural battle techniques in Jain Ramayana narratives. |
| 20 | Satyabhama | Krishna–Neminatha cycle, often treated as the Jain Mahabharata/Krishna cycle | Daughter of a Vidyadhara | Associated with vidya-power through her Vidyadhara birth | In Somakirti's Pradyumna Charitra, Satyabhama is described as the daughter of a Vidyadhara and as Krishna's chief queen. |
| 21 | Manojava | Krishna–Neminatha cycle | Vidyadhara | General Vidyadhara powers | In Pradyumna Charitra, Pradyumna finds Manojava tied to a tree and frees him from captivity. |
| 22 | Basanta | Krishna–Neminatha cycle | Vidyadhara | Gives the Indrajala vidya | After a conflict with Manojava, Basanta is reconciled through Pradyumna and gives a valuable necklace and the Indrajala vidya. |
| 23 | Pramana | Krishna–Neminatha cycle | Leader of the Vidyadharas | General Vidyadhara powers | Father of Rati in Pradyumna Charitra. |
| 24 | Rati | Krishna–Neminatha cycle | Daughter of Pramana, a Vidyadhara leader | Not individually named | Marries Pradyumna after waiting for him in the forest, according to Pradyumna Charitra. |

=== Vidyas and powers ===
The Sanskrit word vidya generally means knowledge, learning, or science. In Jain narrative literature, however, the vidyas of Vidyadharas are special sciences, spells, or powers that allow their possessors to perform extraordinary acts. Jain accounts describe Vidyadharas as people who may possess one or more such vidyas, giving them superhuman abilities such as flight.

K. R. Chandra's study of the Jain Paumacariya lists several named vidyas and describes their effects in Jain Ramayana narratives. These include sky-going powers, form-changing powers, magical construction, invisibility, curing snake-bites, creating illusions, and supernatural battle abilities.

| Vidya or power | Meaning or function | Example in Jain narrative |
|---|---|---|
| Agasagamini / sky-going vidya | Power connected with movement through the sky | Narada is described as receiving the Agasagamini Vijja from celestial beings. |
| Bahurupa-vidya | "Many-forms" power; ability to create or multiply forms | Ravana performs austerity in a Jina temple to acquire Bahurupa-vidya; in battle, his severed heads and arms reappear through its power. |
| Indrajala-vidya | Magical or illusion-producing lore | In Somakirti's Pradyumna Charitra, the Vidyadhara Basanta gives Pradyumna a vidya called Indrajala. |
| Form-changing | Ability to alter one's appearance | Chandra notes that Sahasagati changed his form through vidya power. |
| Invisibility | Ability to become unseen | Ravana is described as becoming invisible through vidya power. |
| Magical construction | Ability to create objects or scenes through vidya | Ravana's battle chariot is described as being constructed by Bahurupa-vidya. |
| Healing and protection | Use of vidya to remove danger or cure harm | Chandra notes that vidyas could cure snake-bites and ward off calamities such as fire. |

== See also ==
- Rishi
- Sennin
- Weizza
- Xian
- Yaksha
