= Clay Sanskrit Library =

Series of books

Kālidāsa's The Recognition of Shakúntala (lit. 'अभिज्ञानशकुन्तलम्'), ed. Somadeva Vasudeva.

The Clay Sanskrit Library is a series of books published by New York University Press and the JJC Foundation. Each work features the text in its original language (transliterated Sanskrit) on the left-hand page, with its English translation on the right. The series was inspired by the Loeb Classical Library, and its volumes are bound in teal cloth.

== History ==
The Clay Sanskrit Library (CSL) is the product of the JJC Foundation, a charitable foundation established by John P. and Jennifer Clay, along with New York University Press. John Peter Clay was born in Paterson, New Jersey in 1934. He won a scholarship to attend St Paul's School, London in 1947. In 1951, he was offered a full scholarship by the Queen’s College, Oxford, where he achieved a First-class degree in Sanskrit, Old Persian and Avestan. He was later appointed an Honorary Fellow of the Queen's College. On leaving Oxford, Clay joined Vickers da Costa, a stockbroking firm based in the City of London. He spent 25 years at Vickers, becoming Deputy Chairman and an elected Member of the London Stock Exchange council. In 1982, he left Vickers and moved to New York City, where he founded the international investment management company Clay Finlay Inc.

In the late 1990s, when he was semi-retired, Clay decided to return to his early passion, Sanskrit literature: he envisioned a series that would make the classics easily available to the general public for the first time. He shared his ambitions for the CSL with Richard Gombrich (also an alumnus of St Paul’s School, London), who was the Boden Professor of Sanskrit at Oxford University from 1976 to 2004. Richard Gombrich was appointed General Editor of the Clay Sanskrit Library. Sanskrit scholars Somadeva Vasudeva and Isabelle Onians were appointed Associate Editors, and thirty academics from eight countries were appointed to produce new translations of classical Sanskrit texts. In 2007, Sheldon Pollock joined Gombrich as Co-General Editor, and Gombrich resigned in early 2008. In 2009, the CSL ended its initial project and in 2010 Pollock joined the Murty Classical Library of India, which seeks to publish works in Sanskrit as well as other Indian languages. John Clay died in 2013, following complications from multiple sclerosis. In early 2016, Camillo Formigatti (formerly of the University of Cambridge) became John Clay Sanskrit Librarian at the Bodleian Library, University of Oxford, where previously in 2010 the JJC Foundation had sponsored a CSL international outreach program led by Matt Kimberly.

== Publication history ==
Facing page layout from Budhasvāmin's The Emperor of the Sorcerers

The first 15 volumes of the Clay Sanskrit Library (CSL) were published in 2005. An additional 41 volumes were published between 2006 and 2009, far exceeding Clay’s original vision of 50 titles. The 56 published volumes represent the richness and wide variety of Sanskrit literature. They include selections from famous epics, novels, poetry, satire and drama. The entire Clay Sanskrit Library is available for purchase through NYU Press. Selected titles may be purchased individually, in a 56 volume complete set or in mini-sets, grouped thematically.

In 2016, in conjunction with NYU Press, JJC launched the Digital Clay Sanskrit Library (eCSL) for ebook platforms: Amazon's Kindle, Apple's iBooks, Google Play and KOBO. The eCSL collection comprises 20 volumes. In November 2019, in conjunction with the JJC Foundation, the Bodleian Library published A SANSKRIT TREASURY: A Compendium of Literature from the Clay Sanskrit Library with a foreword by Amartya Sen. The lavishly illustrated Compendium (ISBN 978-1-85124-5314) is produced by Dr. Camillo Formigatti, the John Clay Sanskrit Librarian. It contains excerpts from the CSL collection. These excerpts are paired with manuscripts from the Bodleian Library from the Hindu, Buddhist, and Jain traditions, and Mughal miniatures.

== List of volumes ==
=== Epic ===
Maha·bhárata

- Maha·bhárata II: The Great Hall (Sabhāparvan): 588 pp, Paul Wilmot, 2006, ISBN 978-0-8147-9406-7
- Maha·bhárata III: The Forest (Vanaparvan) (volume four of four): 374 pp, William J. Johnson, 2005, ISBN 978-0-8147-4278-5
- Maha·bhárata IV: Viráta (Virāṭaparvan): 516 pp, Kathleen Garbutt, 2007, ISBN 978-0-8147-3183-3
- Maha·bhárata V: Preparations for War (Udyogaparvan) (volume one of two): 450 pp, Kathleen Garbutt, with a foreword by Gurcharan Das, 2008, ISBN 978-0-8147-3191-8
- Maha·bhárata V: Preparations for War (Udyogaparvan) (volume two of two): 789 pp, Kathleen Garbutt, 2008, ISBN 978-0-8147-3202-1
- Maha·bhárata VI: Bhishma (Bhīṣmaparvan) (volume one of two) Including the "Bhagavad Gita" in Context: 615 pp, Alex Cherniak, Foreword by Ranajit Guha, 2008, ISBN 978-0-8147-1696-0
- Maha·bhárata VI: Bhishma (volume two of two): 582pp, Alex Cherniak, 2009, ISBN 978-0-8147-1705-9
- Maha·bhárata VII: Drona (Droṇaparvan) (volume one of four): 473 pp, Vaughan Pilikian, 2006, ISBN 978-0-8147-6723-8
- Maha·bhárata VII: Drona (Droṇaparvan) (volume two of four): 394 pp, Vaughan Pilikian, 2009, ISBN 978-0-8147-6776-4
- Maha·bhárata VIII: Karna (Karṇaparvan) (volume one of two): 604 pp, Adam Bowles, 2007, ISBN 978-0-8147-9981-9
- Maha·bhárata VIII: Karna (Karṇaparvan) (volume two of two): 624 pp, Adam Bowles, 2008, ISBN 978-0-8147-9995-6
- Maha·bhárata IX: Shalya (Śalyaparvan) (volume one of two): 371 pp, Justin Meiland, 2005, ISBN 978-0-8147-5706-2
- Maha·bhárata IX: Shalya (Śalyaparvan) (volume two of two): 470 pp, Justin Meiland, 2007, ISBN 978-0-8147-5737-6
- Maha·bhárata X & XI: Dead of the Night & The Women (Sauptikaparvan & Strīparvan): 416 pp, Kate Crosby, 2009, ISBN 978-0-8147-1727-1
- Maha·bhárata XII: Peace (Śāntiparvan): "The Book of Liberation" (volume three of five): 626 pp, Alex Wynne, 2009, ISBN 0-8147-9453-X

Ramáyana by Valmíki

- Ramáyana I: Boyhood (Bālakāṇḍa): 424 pp, Robert P. Goldman, 2005, ISBN 0-8147-3163-5
- Ramáyana II: Ayódhya (Ayodhyākāṇḍa): 652 pp, Sheldon I. Pollock, 2005, ISBN 0-8147-6716-8
- Ramáyana III: The Forest (Araṇyakāṇḍa): 436 pp, Sheldon I. Pollock, 2006, ISBN 0-8147-6722-2
- Ramáyana IV: Kishkíndha (Kiṣkindhākāṇḍa): 415 pp, Rosalind Lefeber, 2005, ISBN 0-8147-5207-1
- Ramáyana V: Súndara (Sundarakāṇḍa): 538 pp, Robert P. Goldman & Sally J. Sutherland Goldman, 2006, ISBN 0-8147-3178-3

=== Classical poetry ===
- The Birth of Kumára (Kumārasaṃbhava) by Kālidāsa. 360 pp, David Smith, 2005, ISBN 0-8147-4008-1
- Love Lyrics (Amaruśataka, Śatakatraya and Caurapañcāśikā) by Amaru, Bhartṛhari and Bilhaṇa. 327 pp, Greg Bailey & Richard Gombrich, 2005, ISBN 0-8147-9938-8
- Messenger Poems (Meghadūta, Pavanadūta and Haṃsadūta) by Kālidāsa, Dhoyī and Rūpa Gosvāmin. 293 pp, Sir James Mallinson, 2006, ISBN 0-8147-5714-6
- Three Satires (Kaliviḍambana, Kalāvilāsa and Bhallaṭaśataka) by Nīlakaṇṭha, Kṣemendra and Bhallaṭa. 403 pp, Somadeva Vasudeva, 2005, ISBN 0-8147-8814-9
- Gita·govínda: Love Songs of Radha and Krishna by Jayadeva. Foreword by Sudipta Kaviraj. 256 pp, Lee Siegel, 2009, ISBN 0-8147-4078-2
- “Bouquet of Rasa” and “River of Rasa” by Bhānudatta. 442 pp, Sheldon I. Pollock, 2009, ISBN 0-8147-6755-9
- Bhatti’s Poem: The Death of Rávana by Bhaṭṭi. 566 pp, Oliver Fallon, 2009, ISBN 0-8147-2778-6
- On Self-Surrender, Compassion, and the Mission of a Goose: Sanskrit Poetry from the South by Appayya Dīkṣita and Vedāntadeśika, Yigal Bronner & David Shulman, 2009, ISBN 978-0-8147-4110-8
- Seven Hundred Elegant Verses by Govardhaṇa: 360 pp, Friedhelm Hardy, 2009, ISBN 0-8147-3687-4

=== Drama ===
- The Lady of the Jewel Necklace and The Lady who Shows her Love (Ratnāvalī and Priyadarśikā) by Harṣa: 514pp, Wendy Doniger, 2007, ISBN 978-0-8147-1996-1
- Much Ado About Religion (Āgamaḍambara) by Bhaṭṭa Jayanta: 320 pp, Csaba Dezső, 2005, ISBN 0-8147-1979-1
- Rákshasa’s Ring (Mudrārākṣasa) by Viśākhadatta: 385 pp, Michael Coulson, 2005, ISBN 0-8147-1661-X
- Rama Beyond Price (Anargharāghava) by Murāri: 638 pp, Judit Törzsök, 2006, ISBN 0-8147-8295-7
- The Recognition of Shakúntala (Abhijñānaśākuntala, Kashmir Recension) by Kālidāsa: 419 pp, Somadeva Vasudeva, 2006, ISBN 0-8147-8815-7
- Rama’s Last Act (Uttararāmacarita) by Bhavabhūti: 458 pp, Sheldon I. Pollock, with a foreword by Girish Karnad, 2007, ISBN 978-0-8147-6733-7
- How the Nagas were Pleased (Nāgānanda) by Harṣa and The Shattered Thighs (Ūrubhaṅga) by Bhāsa: 376 pp, Andrew Skilton, 2009, ISBN 0-8147-4066-9
- Little Clay Cart by Śūdraka. Foreword by Partha Chatterjee: 674 pp, Diwakar Acharya, 2009, ISBN 0-8147-0729-7
- How Úrvashi Was Won by Kālidāsa: 566 pp, Velcheru Narayana Rao & David Shulman, 2009, ISBN 0-8147-2778-6
- The Quartet of Causeries by Śūdraka, Śyāmilaka, Vararuci & Īśvaradatta, Csaba Dezső & Somadeva Vasudeva, 2009, ISBN 978-0-8147-1978-7
- Málavika and Agni·mitra by Kālidāsa: 350 pp, Daniel Balogh & Eszter Somogyi, 2009, ISBN 0-8147-8702-9
- The Rise of Wisdom Moon by Kṛṣṇamiśra: 396 pp, Matthew Kapstein, 2009, ISBN 0-8147-4838-4

=== Other narrative ===
- The Emperor of the Sorcerers (Bṛhatkathāślokasaṃgraha) by Budhasvāmin (volume one): 452 pp, Sir James Mallinson, 2005, ISBN 0-8147-5701-4
- The Emperor of the Sorcerers (Bṛhatkathāślokasaṃgraha) by Budhasvāmin (volume two): 467 pp, Sir James Mallinson, 2005, ISBN 0-8147-5707-3
- The Epitome of Queen Lilávati (Līlāvatīsāra) by Jinaratnasuri (volume one): 543 pp, R.C.C. Fynes, 2005, ISBN 0-8147-2741-7
- The Epitome of Queen Lilávati (Līlāvatīsāra) Jinaratnasuri (volume two): 650 pp, R.C.C. Fynes, 2006, ISBN 0-8147-2742-5
- Five Discourses on Worldly Wisdom (Pañcatantra) by Viṣṇuśarman: 562 pp, Patrick Olivelle, 2006, ISBN 0-8147-6208-5
- Heavenly Exploits (Divyāvadāna): 444 pp, Joel Tatelman, 2005, ISBN 0-8147-8288-4
- The Ocean of the Rivers of Story (Kathāsaritsāgara) by Somadeva (volume one of seven): 556 pp, Sir James Mallinson, 2007, ISBN 978-0-8147-8816-5
- The Ocean of the Rivers of Story (Kathāsaritsāgara) by Somadeva (volume two of seven): 608 pp, Sir James Mallinson, 2009, ISBN 0-8147-9558-7
- What Ten Young Men Did (Daśakumāracarita) by Daṇḍin: 651 pp, Isabelle Onians, 2005, ISBN 0-8147-6206-9
- “Friendly Advice” and “King Víkrama’s Adventures” (Hitopadeśa and Vikramacarita) by Nārāyaṇa: 742 pp, Judit Törzsök, 2007, ISBN 978-0-8147-8305-4
- Handsome Nanda (Saundarananda) by Aśvaghoṣa: 392 pp, Linda Covill, 2007, ISBN 978-0-8147-1683-0
- Life of the Buddha by Aśvaghoṣa: 561 pp, Patrick Olivelle, 2008, ISBN 978-0-8147-6216-5
- Garland of the Buddha’s Past Lives (volume one of two) by Āryaśūra: 548 pp, Justin Meiland, 2009, ISBN 0-8147-9581-1
- Garland of the Buddha’s Past Lives (volume two of two) by Āryaśūra: 543 pp, Justin Meiland, 2009, ISBN 0-8147-9583-8
- Princess Kadámbari by Bāṇa, David Smith (volume one of three): 490 pp, David Smith, 2009, ISBN 0-8147-4080-4

== Bibliography ==
- Banks, Eric (December 2005 – January 2006), "100 Paths to Nirvana", Bookforum, archived from the original on 2007-09-27.
- Hanneder, Jürgen (2008), "Review of Clay Sanskrit Library" (PDF), Zeitschrift der Deutschen Morgenländischen Gesellschaft, 158: 496–499.
- Ormsby, Eric (May 2005), "The jewel in the cobra's mouth", The New Criterion.
- Pollack, R. (7 September 2008), "The Clay Sanskrit Library", rpollack.net.
- Regier, Willis G. (3 March 2006), "Seduced by Sanskrit", Chronicle of Higher Education, vol. 52, no. 26.
- Shulman, David (12 August 2008), "The Arrow and the Poem", New Republic.
- Smith, John D. (11 November 2005), "Script doctors' blunders mar valuable texts", Times Higher Education.
