= Pavanadūta =

Pavanadūta (पवनदूत) or Wind Messenger is an historical sanskrit poem. It was composed by Dhoyin or Dhoyī, a poet at the court of the Sena king Lakshmana who ruled Gauda, in what is now Bengal, during the latter part of the twelfth century CE. His Pavanadūta is probably the earliest surviving example of the many messenger poems which were written in imitation of the Meghadūta or Cloud Messenger by Kālidāsa. It tells the story of Kuvalayavatī, a gandharva maiden from the south who falls in love with King Laksmana when she sees him during his victory tour of the world. She asks the south wind to take her message to the king at his court.

The theme, as of all messenger poems, is viraha, separation in love. Allusions to romance are never far away. While Dhoyin devotes 48 out of 104 stanzas of Pavanadūta to describing the wind’s journey from Sandal mountain in the south to king Lakshmana’s palace in Vijayapura in Bengal, he spends nearly as long a time (38 stanzas) on the message, in which the lovelorn condition of Kuvalayavatī and the wonderful qualities of the king are described in detail.

== English translations ==
The Clay Sanskrit Library has published a translation of Pavanadūta by Sir James Mallinson as a part of the volume Messenger Poems.
