= Amaru Shataka =

Collection of poems by Amaru

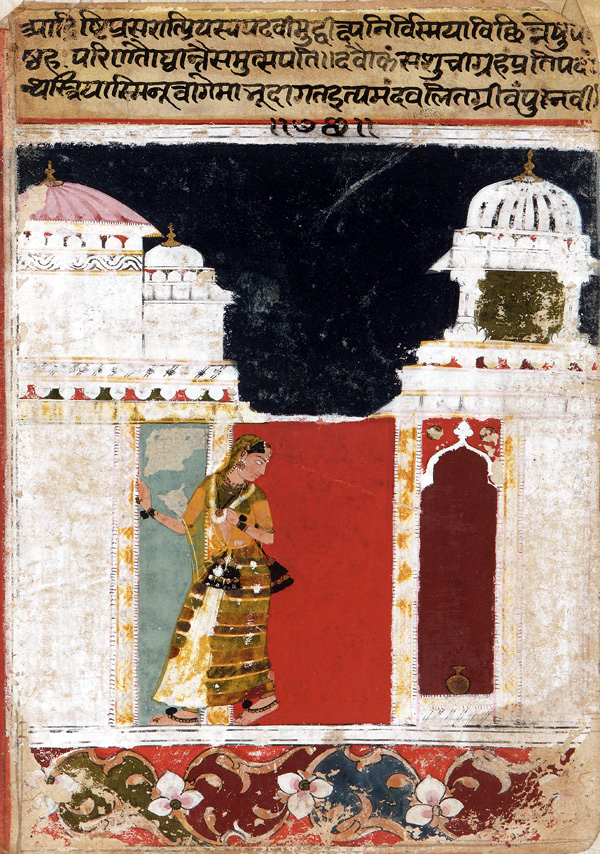
Wife awaits her husband, Verse 76, Amaru Shataka by Amaru, early 17th-century painting.

The Amaruśataka or Amarukaśataka (अमरुशतक, "the hundred stanzas of Amaru"), authored by Amaru (also Amaruka), is a collection of poems dated to about the 7th or 8th century.

== Description ==
The Amaruśataka ranks as one of the finest lyrical poetry in the annals of Sanskrit literature, ranking with Kalidasa and Bhartṛhari's Śṛngâraśataka. The ninth-century literary critic Anandavardhana declared in his Dhvanyaloka that "a single stanza of the poet Amaru ... may provide the taste of love equal to what's found in whole volumes." Its verses have been used by poets and critics as examples and standards to judge other poems by. Andrew Schelling describes it as "love poetry original and vivid as that produced anywhere on the planet".

Its subject is mostly Sringara (erotic love, romantic love) including aspects such as love, passion, estrangement, longing, rapprochement, joy and sorrow, etc. Greg Bailey notes that it is "as much about the social aspects of courting, betrayal, feminine indignance and masculine self-pity as it is about sensuality". Similarly, Schelling notes: "All the flavours or nuances of love are said to lie within the book, though you'll notice that the emphasis falls more on the bitter taste of separation or betrayal than on the sweetness of consummation.". Three recensions were made - The Southern represented by Verma, the Bengali or the Eastern by Ravichandra and the Western by Arjuna . Out of 127 stanzas that r found only 72 are considered to be genuine by Dr. S.K. De and the rest have a doubtful authorship.

As examples, here are some verses:

She had suffered in separation, was weary, pale and gaunt, with her hair all dull and dry.

But, her radiance was restored the moment I returned from travel.

Then, at our game of love, delightful, she so proud and lovely looked, that I did then sip the lips of that slender-bodied woman, in ways that I can never describe.

— translation by A.N.D. Haksar

The pressure of the palm of thy hand, that covers the cheek, has wiped the ornamental paintings off it; thy sighs have lapped up the nectar-sweet moisture of thy lips; the tears which continually choke thy throat. Cause the bosom to heave: thus, Oh inexorable one, thy anger has become thy beloved, but not I! — translation by Chintaman Ramchandra Devadhar

== Authorship ==
Not much is known about the life of Amaru. Traditional accounts attribute the work to King Amaru of Kashmir. The collection in its present form may well represent the work of more than one author—the poems that form part of the collection differ quite significantly across its different regional recensions.

There are also a number of legends associating the collection with the philosopher Adi Shankara. One version occurs in his 14th century biography written by a follower, the Shankara-digvijaya. According to this version, during his debate with Maṇḍana Miśra, he was asked philosophical questions phrased in metaphors of love by the latter's wife, Ubhaya Bharati. Being celibate and therefore ignorant of the kama shastras, Shankara requested an adjournment. He then entered the recently dead body of Amaru and spent a hundred days mastering the art of erotic love, before returning to defeat his opponent. He wrote the Amarushataka to memorialise his learning.

Another version, given in Ravichandra's commentary on the Amarushataka, states that Shankara composed these poems to impart spiritual insight to the epicurean king Amaru, in metaphors he might understand. When this was misunderstood and mocked by the advisers at the court, Shankara entered the body of Amaru and provided a spiritual exegesis of the poems.

Accordingly, several manuscripts add colophons naming Shankara as the true author of the work, and Ravichandra, a mediaeval commentator on the Bengal recension of the Amarusataka, read metaphysical meanings into the verses. Other legends also state that Amaru was the 101st reincarnation of a soul that had previously occupied 100 women.

== English translations ==
- Erotic Love Poems from India, A Translation of the Amarushataka translated by Andrew Schelling, Shambala Library, 2004.
- The Amaruśataka was also translated by Greg Bailey as part of the volume Love Lyrics in the Clay Sanskrit Library.
- Amarusatakam (A centum of Ancient Love Lyrics of Amaruka); edited by C. R. Devadhar A literal translation of the complete text Motilal Banarsidass: first published Poona, 1959; Reprint: Delhi, 1984
- The Norton Anthology of World Literature features a translation by Martha Ann Selby.
- My Shameless Heart Love Lyrics of Amaru Shatakam translated by A.N.D Haksar, Penguin Classics, 2021

== Sources ==
- Lienhard, Siegfried (1984), A history of classical poetry: Sanskrit, Pali, Prakrit, History of Indian literature, v. 3, Wiesbaden: Otto Harrassowitz, ISBN 3-447-02425-9
- Arthur Anthony Macdonell (1900), A History of Sanskrit Literature, Chapter 12
- Arthur Berriedale Keith (1993), A history of Sanskrit literature (reprint ed.), Motilal Banarsidass, pp. 183–187, ISBN 978-81-208-1100-3
