= Brihatkatha =

Lost ancient Indian epic

Bṛhatkathā
- by Guṇāḍhya
- Probable relationship between versions of the Brihatkatha
- Language: Paisaci (पैशाची)
- Form: epic

Bṛhatkathā (बृहत्कथा) (Sanskrit, "the Great Narrative") is an ancient Indian epic, said to have been written by Guṇāḍhya (गुणाढ्य) in a poorly-understood language known as Paiśācī. The work no longer exists but several later adaptations — the Kathāsaritsāgara (कथासरित्सागर), Bṛhatkathāmañjarī (बृहत्कथामंजरी) and Bṛhatkathāślokasaṃgraha (बृहत्कथाश्लोकसंग्रह) in Sanskrit, as well as the Peruṅkatai and Vasudevahiṃḍi in vernaculars — make commentary on the piece.

The date of its composition is uncertain. According to testimonials by later Sanskrit poets such as Daṇḍin, the author of the Kavyadarsha, Subandhu, the author of Vasavadatta, and Bāṇabhaṭṭa, the author of the Kadambari, the Bṛhatkathā existed in the 6th century CE. According to other estimates it predates that period by several more centuries. For example, if the story of Udayana by poet Bhāsa (and also later by Harsha in Ratnavali) was inspired by Brihatkatha, it had to be older than the time of Bhāsa — itself uncertain, but before the 3rd century CE.

Scholars compare Guṇāḍhya with Vyasa and Valmiki even though he did not write the now long-lost Brihatkatha in Sanskrit; the loss of this text is one of the greatest losses of Indian literature. Presently available are its two Kashmiri Sanskrit recensions, the Brihatkathamanjari by Kshemendra and the Kathasaritsagara by Somadeva.

== Gunadhya ==
Guṇāḍhya could have flourished during the reign of a Satavahana king of Pratishthana (modern-day Paithan, Maharashtra). According to D. C. Sircar, he probably flourished between the 1st century BCE and 3rd century CE. An alternative account, mentioned in the Nepala Mahatmya of the Skanda Purana, states that Gunadhya was born in Mathura, and was a court poet of the king Madana of Ujjain. Sircar calls this tradition less authentic.

== Early references ==
The earliest extant reference to the Bṛhatkathā seems to be that of Subandhu (600-700 CE) in Vasavadatta. Bāṇa (7th century) refers to it in his romances Harshacharita and Kadambari. A reference by Daṇḍin in his Kavyadarsha is problematic because it describes the Bṛhatkathā as being marvelous and as composed in the vernacular of the bhūtas (evidently Paiśācī). However, the information appears to be second-hand. A fuller reference is provided in Dashakumaracharita, whose author is possibly not the same Daṇḍin. Later references include the Daśarūpa of Dhanamjaya, Nalacampū of Trivikramabhaṭṭa, and Āryāsaptaśatī of Govardhanācārya. A Cambodian inscription (c. 875) expressly mentions Guṇāḍhya and his aversion to Prakrit. The earliest extant Kannada work on grammar and poetics, Kavirajamarga by Nripatunga (c. 850), mentions a now-lost Sanskrit version of Bṛhatkathā by the author Durvinita. We can safely assume the existence of a romantic work by Guṇāḍhya before 600 CE.

== Reconstructed content ==
Relationships of chief characters in the Brihatkatha (as evidenced by the derived texts Brihatkathashlokasamgraha, Brihatkathamanjari, and Kathasaritsagara).

Although several derivative works remain today, they differ so greatly that they cannot be used to reconstruct the Bṛhatkathā in its totality. However, some strong inferences can be made about its content based on their similarities.

=== Udayana ===
Due to a dohada ("pregnancy craving"), Mṛgāvatī, pregnant with Udayana, is either covered or immersed in red. A monstrous bird mistakes her for raw meat and carries her away, later dropping her. She is cared for in a hermitage, where she raises her son. Udayana obtains a wonderful lute, elephant-taming skills, and confidants; he and his mother eventually return to their home, Kauśāmbī.

Udayana is later captured by Pradyota, the King of Ujjayinī. Here, he teaches the lute to Pradyota's daughter, Vāsavadattā, and they fall in love. Eventually, they escape to Kauśāmbī, where Udayana's rightful kingship is restored, and they are married. But, fearing Udayana is weakening, and desiring an additional political alliance, Udayana's ministers make him believe that Vāsavadattā is dead, and arrange a marriage to Padmāvatī.

Though he is later reunited with Vāsavadattā, Udayana remains childless. Later, as a boon of Kubera, Vāsavadattā becomes pregnant with Naravāhanadatta (his name means "given by Kubera"), who is fated to become the emperor of the Vidyādharas.

=== Naravāhanadatta ===
Udayana's life serves as the prelude to the central story of his son, Naravāhanadatta. Unlike his father, who appears in several works unrelated to the Bṛhatkathā, Naravāhanadatta is known only from texts demonstrably linked to the Bṛhatkathā.

Equivalents of chief names
Sanskrit	Tamil (Peruṅkatai)
Kauśāmbī	Kōcampi
Ujjayinī	Uñcai, Uñcēṉai
Gomukha	Kōmukaṉ
Hariśikha	Arucikaṉ
Kaliṅgasenā	Kaliṅkacēṉai
Madanamañjukā	Mataṉamañcikai
Mānasavega	Māṇacavēkaṇ
Mārubhūtika (Bhūti, Marubhūti)	Pūti
Naravāhanadatta	Naravāṇatattaṉ
Padmāvatī	Patumāpati
Pradyota Mahāsena	Piraccōtaṉaṉ Maṟamāccēṉaṉ
Ṛṣabhaka	Iṭapakaṉ
Rumaṇvān (Rumaṇvat)	Urumaṇṇuvā
Śatānīka	Catāṉikaṉ
Tapantaka	Tavantakaṉ
Udayana	Utayaṇaṉ
Vasantaka	Vayantakaṉ
Vāsavadattā	Vācavatattai
Vegavatī	Vēkavati
Yaugandharāyaṇa	Yūkantarāyaṇaṉ, Yūki
Placenames in gray.

Character equivalents in the Vasudevahiṃḍi
Sanskrit	Mahārāṣṭri
Naravāhanadatta	Vasudeva
Udayana	Aṃdhagavaṇhi

== Relevance ==
The earliest reference to Vikramāditya is traced in the lost Brihatkatha. Guṇāḍhya describes the great generosity, undaunted valour and other qualities of Vikramāditya, whose qualities are also mentioned by Satavahana king Hāla or Halavahana, a predecessor of Gautamiputra Satakarni in his Gaha Sattasai; Guṇāḍhya and Hāla lived close to the time of Vikramāditya.

Guṇāḍhya wrote the Brihatkatha in the little-known Prakrit called Paiśācī, the language of common people of the border regions of Northwest India. Daṇḍin asserts the fundamental importance of the Brihatkatha and states that it was written in prose and not in poetic form suggested by the three known Kashmiri rescensions Haracaritacintamani of Jayaratha included.

Brihatkatha must have been a storehouse of tales about heroes and kings and gods and demigods and also about animals and birds. Kshemendra's Brihatkathamanjari must be a faithful summary of the original which too was in eighteen Books called Lambakas. The earliest version must have been the Bṛhatkathāślokasaṃgraha of Budhasvamin, the complete work of which has not been found.

Guṇāḍhya was thought to have been a versatile writer, and well professed in literary featuring myths, magic and fairy tales. The stories forming the Brihatkatha are said to have had a divine origin which origin is recounted by Somadeva. Since King Satvahana has been identified with Shalivahana, Guṇāḍhya may have lived around 78 CE. Guṇāḍhya's story is told from his point of view and not by an unseen, omnipresent narrator, as in the case of Vyasa and Valmiki.

== Legendary origin ==
Major characters and path of Shiva's story in the legend of Gunadhya, as told in the first Book of the Kathasaritsagara (Ocean of Rivers of Story).

For the origin of Brihatkatha as described in Kathasaritsagara, see the adjacent diagram.
