= Anargharāghava =

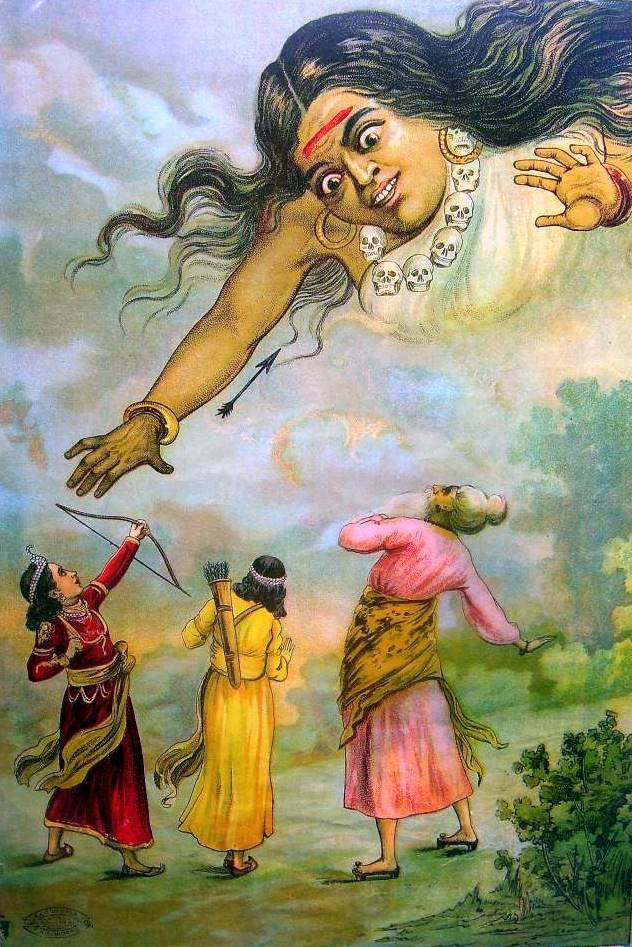

The Anargharāghava (Devanagari: अनर्घराघव; English: priceless (anargha) Rama (rāghava)) is a dramatised retelling of the Ramayana, and is a piece of classical Sanskrit poetry. It is the only surviving work by Murāri, a Brahmin court poet, who lived some time between the 8th and 10th century CE, perhaps in Odisha or in neighbouring South India.

Because of its elegant style, learned allusions and often striking imagery, the poem has been a favourite among pandits, although it received little attention in the West until recently. The epic story of Rama’s exploits is presented as a series of political intrigues and battles, and contrasted with lyrical passages of various kinds: on love and war, pride and honor, gods and demons, rites and myths, regions and cities of ancient India.

The play has little action — most fights and events take place behind the scenes or between acts — focussing instead on diction and other elements of dramatic representation, reminiscent of the Keralan Kudiyattam tradition. Although Kutiyattam representations are envisaged for dramas with more action than the Anargharāghava, actual performances — which normally include only one episode of a play in one performance — often resemble chanting recitations of poetry interspersed with choreographed movements rather than what one would normally call theatre.

Murāri's emphasis on writing a play rather than a series of stanzas is also seen in the numerous allusions to plays and theatre. In the Prakrit-Sanskrit prelude of Act 4, entitled miśraviṣkambhaka, Mālyavan, the great intriguer of the demons, Rāvaṇa’s minister, is angry with Vishvāmitra, who is directing a ‘bad drama’, durnāṭaka, a play which is altogether against Mālyavan’s will. The expression is made more explicit by one of the commentators, Vishnubhatta, who gives the following paraphrase: he Vishvamitra directs everything himself, just as a stage-manager does (svayaṃ sūtradhāravat sarvaprēraka iti bhāvaḥ). In presenting the Rama-story as a story of intrigues, Murāri follows the tradition of Bhavabhuti’s Mahāvīracarita, but renews it with his parallels from the world of stage.

== Translations ==
- Anargharāghavam with Sanskrit commentary and Hindi translation by Rāmachandra Miśra, Varanasi: Chowkhamba Vidya Bhawan, 1960.
- Anargharāghava: Das Schauspiel vom kostbaren Raghuspross. Einführung und Übersetzung by Karin Steiner, Drama und Theater in Südasien, Wiesbaden: Harrassowitz Verlag, 1997.
- Rama Beyond Price by Judit Törzsök, Clay Sanskrit Library, 2006.

== See also ==
- Sanskrit drama
- Sanskrit literature
