= Dhoyin =

Dhoyin or Dhoyī was a 12th century Sanskrit-language poet who composed the Pavanadūta. He was a court poet of the Sena king Lakshmana Sena, who ruled Gauda in what is now Bengal.

== Personal life ==
Dhoyi was born in a Tantuvaya (weaver) caste family from Nabadwip, according to Niharranjan Ray; Whereas according to PN Chopra he was a Baidya. He is sometimes referred as Dhoyi Kaviraj. He was one of the five gems of Sanskrit scholars, which was mentioned at the court of Lakshmana Sena.

== Style ==
The theme of all messenger poems is viraha, separation in love, and allusions to romance are never far away. Despite sharing Kālidāsa's use of conventional romantic motif, Dhoyin’s messenger poem was much more than a mere pastiche of the Meghadūta. Dhoyin devoted nearly half of his work (48 out of 104 stanzas) to describing the wind’s journey from Sandal mountain in the south to King Lakshmana’s palace at Vijayapura in Bengal. He spends a long time on the message (38 stanzas) in which the lovelorn condition of Kuvalayavatī and the wonderful qualities of the king are described in detail.

Dhoyin had aims beyond the expression of rasa, aesthetic sentiment, which is traditionally the sole purpose of Sanskrit poetry. He devoted a greater proportion of his poem to the message because so he could pursue his aims more effectively. The Pavanadūta is similar in style to Kālidāsa's Meghadūta.

== Works ==
Dhoyin's Pavanadūta or Wind Messenger is probably one of the earliest surviving examples of the many messenger poems which were written in imitation of Kālidāsa's Meghadūta or Cloud Messenger.

The Clay Sanskrit Library has published a translation of Pavanadūta by Sir James Mallinson as a part of the volume Messenger Poems.
