= John P. Clay =

John Clay (born in 1934 in Paterson, New Jersey – June 24, 2013) was an investor and through this work, the founder and patron of the Clay Sanskrit Library, a publishing venture that produced editions of Sanskrit classics with English translation on facing pages.

== Education and financial career ==
Clay was a 1957 graduate of the University of Oxford where he took first class honors in Sanskrit, Avestan and Old Persian. He went on to a long career in global investment banking with Clay Finlay, Inc, New York, and before that with Vickers da Costa, New York, and the London Stock Exchange.

== Sanskrit translation ==
In 1999 he decided that he wanted to give enduring patronage to his real passion: Sanskrit literature and his vision of a series that would make all the classics available to the general public for the first time. With his wife Jennifer, John founded the JJC Foundation and he shared his vision for the Clay Sanskrit Library with Richard Gombrich, Boden Professor of Sanskrit at Oxford since 1976 (a classmate of Clay's at St Paul’s school, London), and Gombrich agreed to serve as general editor of the Library. As John Clay himself remembers: “We were inspired by a spirit of exploration.” Clay then hired Somadeva Vasudeva and Isabelle Onians (themselves Sanskrit scholars) to be associate editors for the series, as well as more than forty leading academics from ten different countries, to produce new translations of all of the classical Sanskrit texts. Later, another joint general editor was Sheldon Pollock, William B. Ransford Professor of Sanskrit and South Asian Studies at Columbia University. The series, co-published with New York University Press, was initially planned to consist of some 100 volumes upon completion, but was brought to an end in summer 2009 with 56 volumes published.

One anecdote told of Clay is that on graduation from Oxford, Clay was invited to make an academic career. He is said to have responded that he would prefer to go out into the world and make his fortune, but he more or less told the Academy that one day he might be back. In his decades of intercontinental air travel he wished he had pocket-sized volumes with facing pages of Sanskrit literature and English translation, the Greek and Latin Loeb analogues of which he was able to carry in his pocket. His dream was thus to get the Clay Sanskrit Library on sale in airport bookshops.

At his death Clay established at Queen’s College Oxford, the John P Clay Graduate Scholarship in Manuscript and Text Cultures: Sanskrit. This is a graduate scholarship for up to a maximum of three years for a DPhil student in Oriental Studies whose research focuses on Manuscript and Text Cultures with a special focus on Sanskrit.
