= Vasudeva-hindi =

C. 5th-century CE Jain narrative

- Author: Sangha-dasa Gani
- Original title: वसुदेव-हिण्डी
- Language: Archaic Maharashtri Prakrit
- Subject: Adventures of Vasudeva
- Publication date: possibly 3rd-5th century CE
- Publication place: India

Vasudeva-hindi (IAST: Vasudevahiṇḍī, "Vasudeva's wanderings") is a Jain text by Sangha-dasa, probably from 5th-century India. The text narrates several stories in the form of nested narrative layers. The main story is borrowed from Gunadhya's Brihat-katha, with the original hero Nara-vahana-datta replaced by Krishna's father Vasudeva.

== Authorship and date ==
Vasudeva-hindi is the oldest surviving text of the Jain narrative literature. The Jain monk Sangha-dasa wrote it in archaic Maharashtri Prakrit language. The author claims that the legend of Vasudeva was first told by Mahavira's pupil Sudharman to his disciple Jambu, and since then, the story was transmitted to the author through a series of teachers and disciples.

The text was definitely composed before 610 CE, when Jina-bhadra-gani Kshama-shramana refers to it in his Visheshana Vati. The author dates the text to the year 530 of an unspecified calendar era. Scholars K.R. Chandra and M.A. Dhaky believe that the era is the Vikrama Samvat, and thus, date the text to 473 CE. Indologist J.C. Jain writes that the date of Vasudeva-hindi has been "fixed" as the end of the 3rd century, but Indologist John E. Cort notes that there is no scholarly consensus on this, and Jain authors tend to date their texts as early as possible. U.P. Shah dates the text to early 5th century or a little earlier, while M.N.P. Tiwari dates it to mid-6th century.

Some parts of the text, such as Dhammilla-hindi, are a later addition to the original text.

The second layer of the frame story in the text names Mahavira as a narrator, which is a way of legitimizing the story as true. The naming of a king (instead of a Jain disciple) as the listener suggests that the text was aimed at an urban audience rather than monks.

== Contents ==
The text narrates the legend of Krishna's father Vasudeva. It is in form of multiple narrative layers, featuring several characters and stories from different times and places. The main story is borrowed from Gunadhya's Brihat-katha tradition, in which the hero is Nara-vahana-datta instead of Vasudeva. The text also includes materials from Vaishnavite texts such as Harivamsa and Vishnu Purana. The author quotes long passages from Jain canonical texts such as Samavayanga Sutra and Sthananga Sutra.

The text progresses to the main story as follows:

Layer	Narrator	Story
1		Conversation between the Jain monk Suhamma and King Konia
2	Suhamma	Conversation between Mahavira and Konia's father, King Senia of Raya-giha
3	Mahavira	Story of king Vasudeva's grandsons
4	Vasudeva	Vasudeva tells his grandsons about his adventures

Layer 4 contains the main story of Vasudeva's adventures, which is interspersed with secondary stories that talk about the Jain faith and its 63 illustrious persons. The narrative layers containing these secondary stories go still deeper. For example, in one of the narrative layers, Vasudeva refuses to marry the grand-daughter of an old woman because of her low social status. The old woman then talks about the origins of her family, narrating the story of her ancestor Usabha.

Layer	Narrator	Story
5	The old woman	Story of Jina Usabha.
6	Sijjamsa	Story of the previous births of Usabha and his donor Sijjamsa (Shreymsa) as twins in the Uttarakurus.
7	The female twin	Story of the twins' previous births as the god Laliyamga and his wife Sayam-pabha.
8	Laliyamga	Story of Laliyamga's previous birth as King Mahabala.
9	Sayambuddha	Mahabala's friend Sayambuddha tells him a series of moral stories.

The narrative then goes back to the main story as follows:

Layer	Narrator	Story
8	Laliyamga	Story of Laliyamga's previous birth as King Mahabala, continued: Mahabala renounces the world, practices extreme austerity, and dies.
7	The female twin	Story of the twins' previous births, continued: Laliyamga and Sayam-pabha die and are reborn as prince Vairajamgha and princess Sirimai.
8	Sirimai	Sirimai remembers her previous birth as Sayam-pabha and her existence as Niāmiyā (Nirnāmikā, "a girl with no name").
7	The female twin	Story of the twins' previous births, continued: Vairajamgha and Sirimai marry and live happily before being poisoned by their son.
6	Sijjamsa	Stories of several previous births of the twins: Gods in Sohamma-heaven; Physician Kesava and his friend Abhayaghosa; Gods in Accua-heaven; Prince Vairanabha and his friend Sujasa; Gods in Savvattha-siddha-heaven; Sijjamsa recalls that after their birth as gods, they were born as Usabha and Sijjamsa.
5	The old woman	Story of Usabha, continued: Usabha preaches the dharma.
4	Vasudeva	Vasudeva continues to narrate stories of his adventures, with each story containing multi-layer sub-stories.

Unlike other texts, such as the Mahabharata, Vasudeva-hindi does not remind the reader of the main frame story or any sub-frame story at any point. According to scholar Anna Aurelia Esposito, Vasudeva-hindi deliberately confuses the readers with such complex layers to cause them to "experience the sensation to be completely lost – lost not only in this thicket of stories, but also in the complex and incomprehensible nature of the world."
