= Govardhana (poet) =

Court poet of the 12th-century Sena king, Lakshmana Sena

Govardhana or Govardhanacharya was the court poet of the 12th-century Sena king, Lakshmana Sena. He was a contemporary of Jayadeva and is known for his aryasaptashati (IAST: āryasaptaśatī), a collection of 700 stanzas of erotic poetry following the arya metre. This was a response to the 700 verses in the more demotic Prakrit language traditionally attributed to King Hala, composed almost a thousand years earlier. Both sets of poems were composed in the āryā metre.
