= Paishachi =

Extinct language of ancient India

Paiśācī Prakrit
- Paishachi
- Brahmi: 𑀧𑁃𑀰𑀸𑀘𑀻
- Region: North India
- Era: Perhaps from 5th century BCE; most texts, however are from 3rd–10th centuries CE
- Language family: Indo-European: Indo-Iranian; Indo-Aryan; (unclassified); Paiśācī Prakrit

Language codes
- ISO 639-3: None (mis)
- Glottolog: pais1238

Paishachi or Paisaci (IAST: Paiśācī) is a largely unattested literary language of the middle kingdoms of India mentioned in Prakrit and Sanskrit grammars of antiquity. It is generally grouped with the Prakrits, with which it shares some linguistic similarities, but is still not considered a spoken Prakrit by the grammarians because it was purely a literary language, and because of its archaicism.

== Identity ==
The etymology of the name suggests that it is spoken by piśācas, (demons). In works of Sanskrit poetics such as Daṇḍin's Kavyadarsha, it is also known by the name of Bhūtabhāṣa, an epithet which can be interpreted either as a "dead language" (i.e. with no surviving speakers), or as "a language spoken by the dead" (i.e. ghouls or ghosts). Evidence which lends support to the former interpretation is that literature in Paiśācī is fragmentary and extremely rare but may have been once common.

The Siddha-Hema-Śabdanuśāśana, a grammar treatise written by Rev. Acharya Hemachandraacharya, includes six languages: Sanskrit, the "standard" Prakrit (virtually Maharashtri Prakrit), Shauraseni, Magahi, Paiśācī, the otherwise-unattested Cūlikāpaiśācī and Apabhraṃśa (virtually Gurjar Apabhraṃśa, prevalent in the area of Gujarat and Rajasthan at that time and the precursor of Gujarati language).

Some scholars have considered Paiśācī to have been the native language of the Punjab region, particularly in the city of Taxila where the Kaikeyī dialect was spoken. The non-aspiration often in the records of those regions is apparently due to the foreign influence.

The 13th-century Tibetan historian Buton Rinchen Drub wrote that the early Buddhist schools were separated by choice of sacred language: the Mahāsāṃghikas used Prākrit, the Sarvāstivādins used Sanskrit, the Sthaviravādins used Paiśācī, and the Saṃmitīya used Apabhraṃśa.

== Relationship to later languages ==
Today, the Punjabi and the Dardic languages have been proposed as descendants of Paiśācī. According to Mangat Bhardwaj, it is possible that the Western and Eastern Punjabi zones may have originally spoken different Apabhraṁśas, with the Lahnda zone being primarily Paiśāchī Apabhraṁśa while the Eastern Punjabi area consisted of a transitional zone of Śaurasenī merging into Paiśāchī, with Śaurasenī being spoken in the neighbouring Western Hindi zone. As per Suniti Kumar Chatterji (1926), the protoform of Sindhi, Lahndi, and Punjabi was Udicya (north-western dialects) while Punjabi also bore influence from Sourseni. According to Prabodh Pandit, the Indo-Aryan languages was initially split into three groups, with Punjabi, Lahndi, Sindhi, Kachchi, Kashmiri, and Pahari forming out of the north (north-western) group. As per this formulization, eastern Punjabi (originally very similar to Lahndi) was later influenced by the central zone, first by Śaurasenī and later by Braj, leading it to deviate from Lahndi.

== Literature ==
The most widely known work, although lost, attributed to be in Paiśācī is the Bṛhatkathā (literally "Big Story"), a large collection of stories in verse, attributed to Gunadhya. It is known through its adaptations in Sanskrit as the Kathasaritsagara in the 11th century by Somadeva, and also from the Bṛhatkathā by Kshemendra. Both Somadeva and Kshemendra were from Kashmir where the Bṛhatkathā was said to be popular.

Talking of its existence, Pollock writes:

Linguists have identified this as everything from an eastern Middle-Indic dialect close to Pali to a Munda language of inhabitants of the Vindhya Mountains […] In fact there is little reason to bother to choose […] Paishachi is the joker in the deck of South Asian discourses on language, having an exclusively legendary status, since it is associated with a single lost text, the Bṛhatkathā (The Great Tale), which seems to have existed less as an actual text than as a conceptual category signifying the Volksgeist, the Great Repository of Folk Narratives […] In any event, aside from this legendary work (which "survives" only in one Jain Maharashtri and several Sanskrit embodiments), Paishachi is irrelevant to the actual literary history of South Asia.

== Grammar ==
There is one chapter (Chapter 10 of Prakrita Prakasha) dedicated to Paisachi Prakrit in Prakrita Prakasha, a grammar book of Prakrit languages attributed to Vararuchi. In this work, it is mentioned that the base of Paisachi is Shauraseni Prakrit. It further goes on to mention 10 rules of transforming the base text to Paisachi. D.G. Sircar in his Grammar Of The Prakrit Languages details 14 rules in total, with the first two describing its base. The remaining 12 are as follows:

1. Soft Consonants become Hard. For example, Ga becomes Ka, Gha becomes Kha, Ba becomes Pa and Da becomes Ta.
2. The common word iva (meaning "like" or "as") is replaced by piva.
3. The dental na is always replaced by the retroflex ṇa.
4. The conjunct ṣṭa is replaced by saṭa (breaking the cluster).
5. Similarly, the conjunct sna is replaced by sana.
6. The conjunct ry is replaced by riya.
7. The conjunct jña is replaced by ñña.
8. Specifically in the word Kanyā (Girl), the nya also becomes ñña.
9. Similar to Rule 3, the soft geminated sound jja becomes the hard geminated cca.
10. When the word for King (Rajan) is in certain grammatical cases (like "by the king" or "of the king"), the stem changes to Raci (ja changes to ci)
11. The Suffix -tva, used to say "having done X" is replaced with -tuna.
12. The word for "Heart," Hridaya, is completely substituted with the word Hitapakam. The text mentions this is a very strange rule and might be a corruption of the text, but the rule stands.

== See also ==
- Pali
