= Kathasaritsagara =

11th-century Sanskrit collection of tales

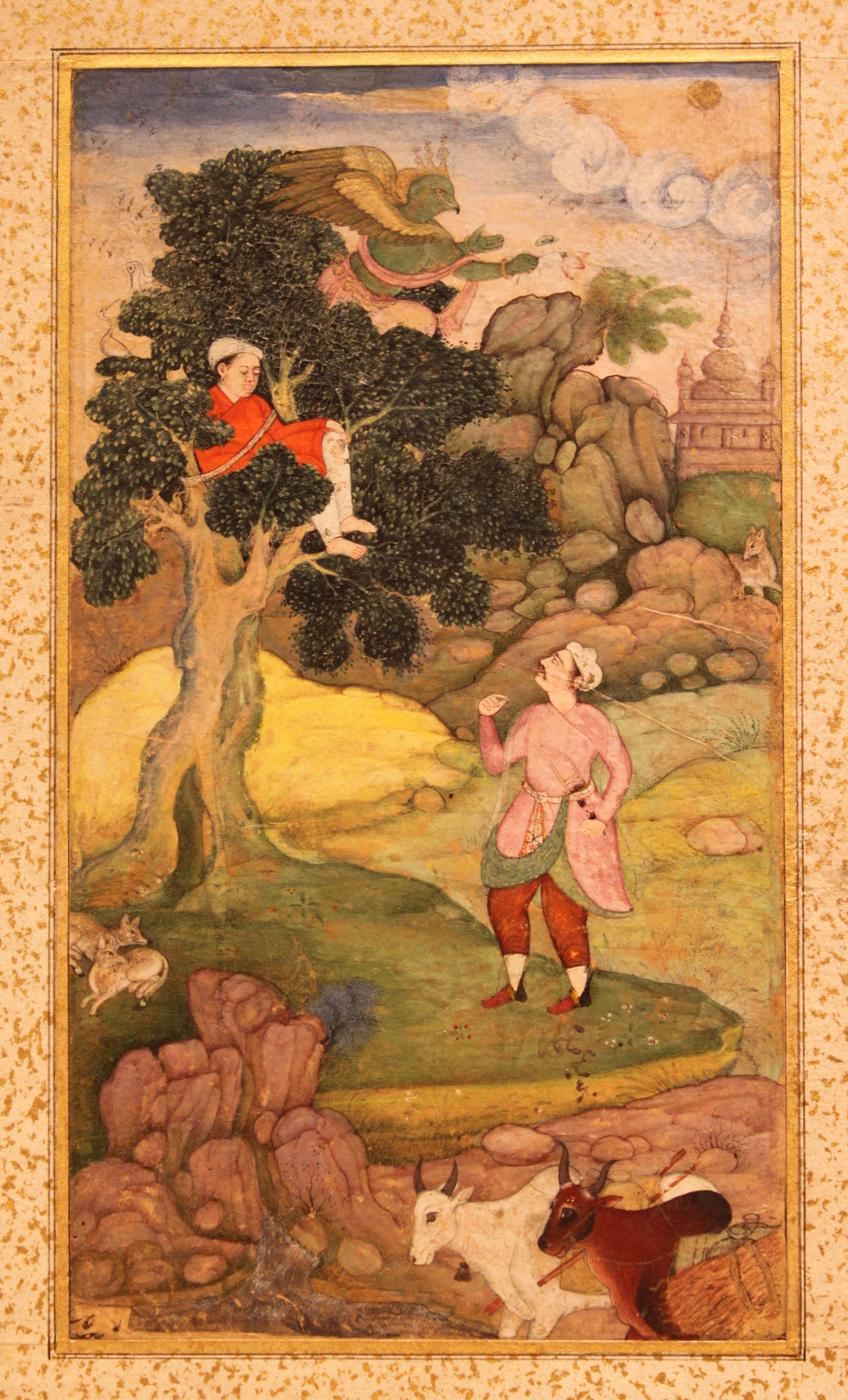
- A 16th-century folio from an Indian retelling of the Kathāsaritsāgara

The Kathāsaritsāgara ("Ocean of the Streams of Stories") (Devanagari: कथासरित्सागर) is a famous 11th-century collection of Indian legends and folk tales as retold in Sanskrit by the Shaivite Somadeva from Kashmir.

Kathāsaritsāgara contains multiple layers of story within a story and is said to have been adopted from Guṇāḍhya's Bṛhatkathā ("the Great Narrative"), which was written in a poorly understood language known as Paiśāchī. The Bṛhatkathā is no longer extant, but several later adaptations still exist—the Kathāsaritsāgara, Bṛhatkathamanjari and Bṛhatkathāślokasaṃgraha. However, none of these recensions necessarily derives directly from Gunadhya, and each may have intermediate versions. Scholars compare Guṇāḍhya with Vyasa and Valmiki even though he did not write the now long-lost Bṛhatkathā in Sanskrit. Presently available are its two Sanskrit recensions, the Bṛhatkathamanjari by Kṣemendra and the Kathāsaritsāgara by Somadeva.

== Author and structure ==
Probable relationship between versions of the Brihatkatha

The author of Kathasaritsagara, or rather its compiler, was Somadeva, the son of Rāma, a Śaiva Brāhman of Kashmir. He tells us that his magnum opus was written (sometime between 1063–1081 CE) for the amusement of Sūryavatī, wife of King Ananta of Kashmir, at whose court Somadeva was a poet. The tragic history of Kashmir at this period—Ananta's two sons, Kalaśa and Harṣa, the worthless degenerate life of the former, the brilliant but ruthless life of the latter, the suicide of Ananta himself, the self-immolation of Sūryavatī on his funeral pyre, and the resulting chaos—forms as a dark and grim background for the setting of Somadeva's tales. The frame story is the narrative of the adventures of Naravahanadatta, son of the legendary king Udayana, his romances with damsels of great beauty and wars with enemies. As many as 350 tales are built around this central story, making it the largest existing collection of Indian tales.

Somadeva declares that his work is a faithful though abridged translation of a much larger collection of stories known as the Bṛhatkathā, or Great Tale written in the lost Paisaci dialect by Guṇāḍhya. But the Kashmirian (or "Northwestern") Bṛhatkathā that Somadeva adapted may be quite different from the Paisaci ur-text, as at least 5 apparent descendants of Guṇāḍhya's work exist—all quite different in form and content, the best-known (after the Kathāsaritsāgara itself) probably being the Bṛhatkathāślokasaṃgraha of Budhasvamin from Nepal. Like the Panchatantra, tales from the Kathāsaritsāgara (or its related versions) travelled to many parts of the world.

Kathāsaritsāgara consists of 18 lambhakas ("books") of 124 taramgas (chapters called as "waves") and approximately 22,000 ślokas (distichs) in addition to prose sections. The śloka consists of 2 half-verses of 16 syllables each. Thus, syllabically, the Kathāsaritsāgara is approximately equal to 66,000 lines of iambic pentameter; by comparison, John Milton's Paradise Lost is 10,565 lines. All this pales in comparison to the (presumably legendary) 700,000 ślokas of the lost original Brihatkatha.

== Synopsis ==
The Kathāsaritsāgara is a large work. Each book comprises a number of stories loosely strung together, by being narrated for the recreation or information of the same individuals, or arising out of their adventures. These are Udayana, king of Kosambi, and his son Naravahanadatta. The marriage of the latter with various damsels of terrestrial or celestial origin, and his elevation to the rank of king of the Vidyadharas, a class of heavenly spirits, are the leading topics of most of the books; but they merely constitute the skeleton of the composition, the substance being made up of stories growing out of these circumstances, or springing from one another with an ingenuity of intricacy which is one of the great charms of all such collections.

Kathāsaritsāgara
Book	Lambhaka	Taramga	Count of slokas
1	Kathapitha (Foundation)	1-8	818
2	Kathamukha (Introduction)	9-14	871
3	Lavanaka	15-20	1198
4	Naravahanadattajanana (Birth of Naravahanadatta)	21-23	501
5	Caturdarika (The Four Wives)	24-26	818
6	Madanamancuka	27-34	1544
7	Ratnaprabha	35-43	1421
8	Suryaprabha	44-50	115
9	Alamkaravati	51-56	4929
10	Saktiyasas	57-66	1120
11	Vela	67	220
12	Sasankavati	68-103	993
13	Madiravati	104	624
14	Panca (The Five)	105-108	1628
15	Mahabhiseka (The Imperial Coronation)	109-110	1739
16	Suratamanjari	111-113	2128
17	Padmavati	114-119	301
18	Visamasila	120-124	420

=== Book 1 ===
The first book (Kathapitha) is introductory, and refers to the origin of the tales contained in the collection to Shiva, who, it is said, related them in private conversation with his wife, Parvati, for her entertainment. One of the attendants of the deity, Pushpadanta, took the liberty of listening, and he repeated them, under the seal of secrecy, to his wife, Jaya, a sort of lady's maid to the goddess. Jaya takes an opportunity of intimating to her mistress that she is acquainted with the stories narrated by Shiva to the great mortification of Parvati who had flattered herself that they had been communicated to her alone. She accordingly complains to Shiva of his having deceived her, and he vindicates himself by discovering the truth. Parvati thereupon pronounces an imprecation upon Pushpadanta, condemning him to be born upon the earth as a man; and she sentences his friend Malyavan, who had ventured to intercede for him, to a like destination. Parvati tells the culprits that they shall resume their celestial condition when Pushpadanta, encountering a yaksha, a follower of Kubera, the god of wealth, doomed for a certain time to walk the earth, as a pishacha or goblin, shall recollect his own former state, and shall repeat to the pishacha the stories he overheard from Shiva; and when Malyavan, falling in with the Pisacha, shall hear from him again the stories that his friend Pushpadanta had narrated. The recitation of the stories also forms the limit of the pishacha's sojourn amongst mortals.

The two demigods, Pushpadanta and Malyavan, are born as two Brahmins, named Vararuchi and Gunadhya, and their adventures as mortals constitute the subject of several tales. Some of these possess much local interest: we have in them literary anecdotes relating to celebrated works and authors, as to Panini the grammarian; notices of historical persons and events, as of the accession of Chandragupta Maurya; and traditions of the origin of celebrated places, as of that of Pataliputra. One of the best-told stories in the whole work occurs here. Upakosha the wife of Vararuchi, becomes, during the absence of her husband, the object of the addresses of the king's family priest, the commander of the guards, the prince's tutor, and her husband's banker. She makes assignments with them all: each as he arrives is quickly followed by his successor, and is secreted only to be finally exposed and punished.

Malyavan, or Gunadhya, in consequence of a dispute with a rival Brahmin, forgoes the use of the Sanskrit, Prakrit and Deshya, or vernacular languages. He afterwards learns the Paisachi language, or that of the goblins, which enables him to receive the narrations as they are told to him by the metamorphosed yaksha, or pishacha. Gunadhya having heard the stories, extending to seven hundred thousand stanzas, wrote them with his blood, for there was no ink in the forest. He then offered the work to Satavahana, king of Pratishthana, who rejected it with abhorrence, on which the author kindled a fire in the forest, and reading it aloud, to the great edification of spirits and goblins, and birds and beasts, he burned it leaf by leaf as he finished the perusal. The news of this proceeding at last reached the king, and he repented of what he had done, and repaired to Gunadhya to solicit the gift of the work. The sage consented to present the king with the hundred thousand verses that had not yet been consigned to the flames. Satavahana took it to his capital, and having received an explanation of it from two of Gunadhya's disciples, he translated it from the language of the pishachas.

=== Books 2 to 5 ===
The second book (Kathamukha) commences that part of the original narrative which was supposedly not consumed, and records the adventures of Udayana, king of Kosambi, a prince of great fame in Sanskrit plays and poems, and his marriage with Vasavadatta, princess of Ujjain. The major sub-stories include the tales of Sridatta, Devasmita and Lohajangha.

The third book (Lavanaka) describes his marriage to the second wife, Padmavati, princess of Magadha and his subsequent conquests. This book is especially rich in mythological sub-stories like Durvasa and Kunti, Urvashi and Pururavas, Indra and Ahalya, Sunda and Upasunda &c.

The fourth book (Naravahanadattajanana) narrates the birth of the son of Udayana, by Vasavadatta, Naravahanadatta; at the same time sons are born to the chief ministers of Udayana, and they become the companions and councilors of the young prince. The book contains the famous story of Jimutavahana.

The fifth book (Caturdarika) records the adventures of Saktivega who became king of the heavenly beings termed Vidyadharas, a class of spirits who reside upon the loftiest peaks of the Himalaya mountains. While a mortal, he possessed superhuman longevity and faculties, including clairvoyance and extrasensory perception. Naravahanadatta, is prophecised to be a king of the Vidyadharas.

=== Book 6 ===
Relationships of chief characters in the Brihatkatha (as evidenced by the derived texts Brihatkathashlokasamgraha, Brihatkathamanjari, and Kathasaritsagara)

The main focus of the sixth book (Madanamanchuka) is the marriage of the young prince Naravahanadatta with Madanamanchuka the daughter of Kalingasena, a princess whose mother is a celestial nymph. Kalingasena had been enamoured of Udayana, and desired to wed him. Udayana wants to marry her, but as he has two wives already, his chief minister argues against it. A friend of the princess, a nymph of air, is also opposed to the match, and a variety of tales are recited on either side in support of the reasoning for and against the union. In the end, a spirit of air, in love with the princess, assumes the form of Udayana, and in this identity weds her. She reconciles without remedy, and has a daughter, Madanamanchuka who is the bride of Udayana's son. The book features the famous story of Usha and Aniruddha.

=== Book 7 ===
In the next book (Ratnaprabha) Naravahanadatta marries Ratnaprabhā a Vidyadhari who was prophesied to be his bride; the wedding is celebrated at the palace of her father, Hemaprabha, on one of the snow-crowned summits of the Himalaya. When the married couple returns to Kosambi the young bride persuades her husband to throw open the doors of the inner quarters, and allow free access to his friends and associates. "The honour of women," she affirms, "is protected by their own principles alone; and where these are corrupt, all precautions are vain." This arrangement not only emancipates the women from jealous restraint, but also triggers a subsequent series of tales, with the prince's companions as narrators. The stories that then ensue (for e.g. Somasvamin, Sringabhuja and Rupasikha) are about the conduct of women; some are tales of revenge.

=== Books 8 and 9 ===
The eighth book (Suryaprabha) is devoted to the adventures of a prince named Suryaprabha, who became king of the Vidyadharas. The scene of action is mostly in the Lokas beyond earth, and the dramatis personae are the Nagas or snake-gods of Patala and the Vidyadharas. This is further illustration of the mode in which Naravahanadatta may fulfil the prophecy.

In the ninth book (Alamkaravati), Naravahanadatta is distraught on the disappearance of his favorite bride Madanamanchuka after throwing open the doors of the inner quarters. He is consoled by the narration of a number of stories about the temporary separation and final reunion of faithful couples. They consist of a compendious recital of the adventures of Nala and Damayanti. The stories continue till the thirteenth book.

=== Book 10 ===
The next book (Saktiyasas), the tenth, is important in the history of literature, as it includes the whole of the Panchatantra. We also have in this book a possible inspiration of another well-known story, that of King Shahryar and His Brother in the One Thousand and One Nights. Two young Brahmins travelling are benighted in a forest, and take up their lodging in a tree near a lake. Early in the night a number of people come from the water, and having made preparation for an entertainment retreat, a Yaksha, a genie, then comes out of the lake with his two wives, and spends the night there; when he and one of his wives are asleep, the other, seeing the youths, invites them to approach her, and to encourage them, shows them a hundred rings received from former gallants, notwithstanding her husband's precautions, who keeps her locked up in a chest at the bottom of the lake. The youths reject her advances; she wakes the genie who is going to put them to death, but the rings are produced in evidence against the unfaithful wife, and she is cast away with the loss of her nose.

=== Books 11 to 13 ===
The eleventh book (Vela) is one huge story, that of Vela, a damsel married to a merchant's son, focusing on their shipwreck, separation and re-union.

The twelfth book (Sasankavati) narrates the huge tale of Mrigankadatta, prince of Ayodhya. The narrative is similar to Daṇḍin's Dashakumaracharita, the Tale of the Ten Princes, in which a prince and his nine companions are separated for a season, and recount what has happened to each when they meet again. The exact stories, however, are different. This book also contains an earlier version of a popular collection of tales called the Vetala Panchavimshati: twenty-five tales of a Vetala being related to Trivikramasena, king of Pratishthan, on the Godavari.

The thirteenth book (Madiravati) is short and recounts the adventures of two young Brahmans, who have secret marriages with a princess and her friend. The incidents are curious and diverting and similar to the contrivances by which Madhava and Makaranda obtain their mistresses in the drama entitled Malatimadhava by Bhavabhuti.

Illustrations from an edition of the Kathasaritsagara, c. 1590

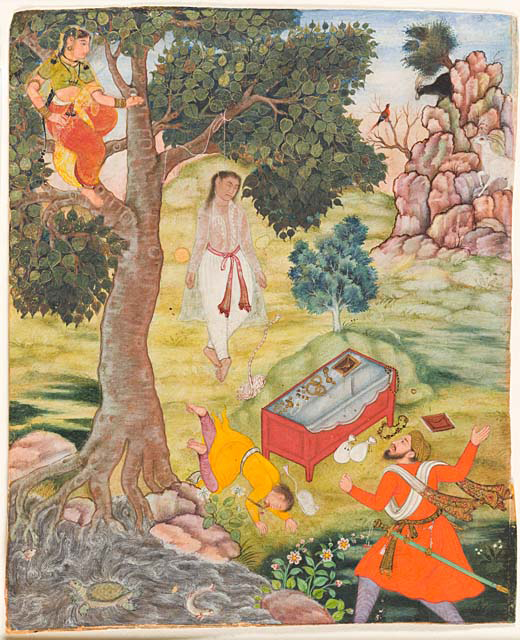
Tale of the Cunning Siddhikari

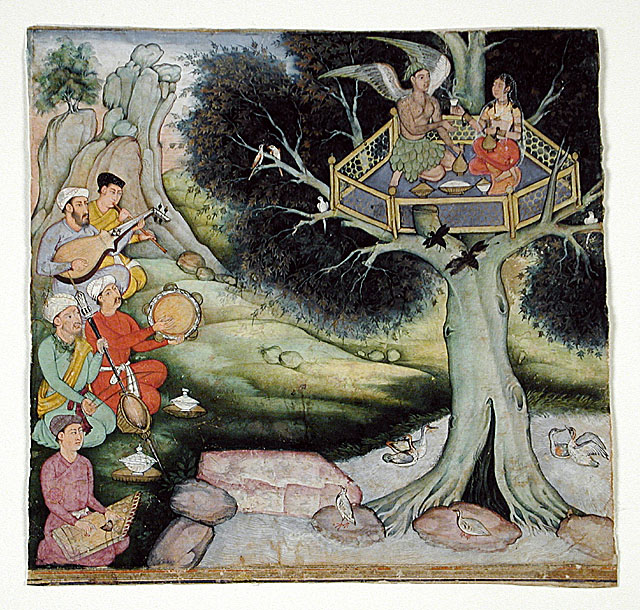
Somaprabha and a Celestial Nymph Listening to Music

=== Book 14 and 15 ===
In the two next books, the fourteenth (Panca) and fifteenth (Mahabhisheka), the scene of action is the fabulous region of the Vidyadharas. In the first, the prince Naravahanadatta, realises that his queen Madanamanchuka was abducted by Manasavega the Vidyadhara, marries additional five women of Vidhyadhara (Vidhyadhari) and finally kills Manasavega to regain his queen.

In Mahabhisheka, Naravahanadatta is crowned emperor of the Vidyadhara people.

=== Book 16 ===
In (Suratamanjari), the sixteenth book, Udayana, resigns his throne to Gopalaka, the brother of his wife Vasavadatta, and, accompanied by his wives and ministers, goes to Mount Kalanjana. A heavenly chariot descends, and conveys them all to heaven. Gopalaka, inconsolable for the loss of his brother-in-law, soon relinquishes his regal state of Kosambi to his younger brother, Palaka, retires to the White Mountain, and spends the rest of his days in the hermitage of Kashyapa. We have then an account of the son of Palaka falling in love with a young girl of low caste, a Chandali, and different stories illustrative of odd couples. Palaka's ministers argue that the very circumstance of the prince's being enamoured of the Chandali is a proof that she must be a princess or goddess in disguise; otherwise, it would be impossible that she should have attracted the affections of any noble individual. They therefore counsel the king to demand her hand from Matanga, her father. Matanga consents on condition that the Brahmins of Ujjain eat in his house. Palaka issues orders that eighteen thousand Brahmins, shall dine with the Chandala. The Brahmins are in great alarm, as this is a degradation and loss of caste, and they pray to Mahakala, the form of Siva especially worshipped in Ujjain, to know what to do. He commands them in a dream to comply, as Matanga is in truth a Vidyadhara. He had conspired against the life of Naravahanadatta, in order to prevent his becoming emperor of the Vidyadharas, and had been therefore condemned by Siva to live in Ujjain with his family as Chandalas. The curse was to terminate when eighteen thousand Brahmins should eat in his house; and this being accomplished, Matanga is restored to his rank, and his daughter is judged a fit bride for the son of the king.

=== Books 17 and 18 ===
The two last books are composed of narratives told by Naravahanadatta, when on a visit to his uncle Gopalaka at the hermitage of Kashyapa. He repeats those stories which were communicated to him when he was separated from Madanamanchuka, to console him under the anguish of separation. (Padmavati) is the love story of Muktaphalaketu, a prince of the Vidyadharas, and Padmavati, daughter of the king of the Gandharvas. The former is condemned by a holy person to become a man, and he is thus for a season separated from the latter. He is, after a short time, restored to his station and his wife.

The last book (Visamasila) has Vikramaditya or Vikramasila, son of Mahendraditya, king of Ujjain, for its hero, and describes his victories over hostile princes, and his acquirement of various princesses. These are interspersed with love adventures, some of which reiterate the calumnies against women, and with stories relating the tricks of professed cheats.

== Historiography: versions and translations ==
=== Sanskrit antecedents: Bṛhatkathāmañjarī and Bṛhatkathāślokasaṃgraha ===
==== Bṛhatkathāmañjarī ====
Bṛhatkathāmañjarī
Book	Lambhaka	Count of slokas
1	Kathapitha (Foundation)	392
2	Kathamukha (Introduction)	421
3	Lavanaka	414
4	Naravahanadattajanana (Birth of Naravahanadatta)	142
5	Caturdarika (The Four Wives)	263
6	Suryaprabha	245
7	Madanamancuka	612
8	Vela	75
9	Sasankavati	2435
10	Visamasila	288
11	Madiravati	83
12	Padmavati	115
13	Panca (The Five)	236
14	Ratnaprabha	83
15	Alamkaravati	375
16	Saktiyasas	646
17	Mahabhiseka (The Imperial Coronation)	55
18	Suratamanjari	215

Somadeva tells us that the Kathāsaritsāgara is not his original work, but is taken from a much larger collection by Guṇāḍhya, known as the Bṛhatkathā. Kṣemendra, the Sanskrit aesthete from Kashmir, had written his Bṛhatkathāmañjarī, a summary of the Bṛhatkathā twenty or thirty years previously. The Kathāsaritsāgara and the Bṛhatkathāmañjarī agree in the number and the titles of the different lambhakas but, after lambhaka 5, disagree in the order of them. However, all the books of the same name in both versions overlap with each other exactly (excluding a few minor details), except for two. Book 8 (Vela) in Kṣemendra is a combination of Book 11 (Vela) and the beginning of Book 14 (Panca) in Kathāsaritsāgara. Considering that Kṣemendra composed two near faithful extracts of the celebrated epics: the Bharatamanjari and the Ramayanamanjari, it is more probable that it was Kṣemendra, and not Somadeva, who drew up the faithful reproduction of the old Paisaci poem. Kathāsaritsāgara is considered to have better charm of language, elegance of style, masterly arrangement and metrical skill. Also, Kṣemendra's collection is a third the length of the Kathāsaritsāgara, the printed text amounting to a little more than 7,561 slokas.

In 1871 Professor Bühler (Indian Antiquary, p. 302 et seq.) proved two important facts: firstly, that Somadeva and Kṣemendra used the same text, and secondly, that they worked entirely independently from one another. A Bṛhatkathā such as the two writers reproduced, a prose work in the Paiśācī dialect, existed, therefore, in Kashmir. But it was no longer the book which Guṇāḍhya had composed. It was a huge compilation, incorporating not only many particular stories from heterogeneous sources, but even whole books such as the Pañcatantra, the Vetālapañcaviṃśati and the story of Nala. The charge of abridging, obscuring and dislocating the main narrative is valid, not against Somadeva and Kṣemendra, but against predecessors, whose work of amplification had been completed, so far as completion can be predicated, perhaps two or three centuries earlier.

==== Bṛhatkathāślokasaṃgraha ====
Apart from the Kashmir redactions there exists a Sanskrit version of Guṇāḍhya's work, bearing the title Bṛhatkathāślokasaṃgraha, i.e. the "Great Tale: Verse Epitome." Only about six of the twenty-six lābhas are currently available. Its discoverer and editor, M. Félix Lacôte, had published (Essai sur Guṇāḍhya et la Bṛhatkathā, Paris, 1908) along with the text an elaborate discussion of all the questions of higher criticism relating to the Kathāsaritsāgara and the other recensions. M. Lacôte's conclusions, which are developed with great perspicacity, may be summarised as follows. The manuscript came from Nepal, the work of a Nepalese writer, by name Budhasvāmin. It is dated to the eighth to the ninth century CE and is based upon the Paiśāci original. It lacks many of the subsidiary tales in the Kathāsaritsāgara, and thus the main narrative stands out concerned predominantly with the actual adventures of Naravāhanadatta, a hero of Guṇāḍhya's own invention.

=== Persian adaptations: Bahr al-asmar and Darya-yi asmar ===
Kathāsaritsāgara was translated into Persian in Kashmir during the reign of Zayn al-‘Abidin (r. 1418/20–1470) under the name of Bahr al-asmar ("Ocean of Stories"). Nowadays this version is not extant; it is known solely through the evidence from other sources. A likely reference to it can be found in the Rajatarangini by Śrīvara (fl. 1459–1505). Śrīvara, the poet laureate at the court, refers to the commissioning of the translation of Sanskrit works into Persian and vice versa by his patron Zayn al-‘Abidin, among them a translation of "a digest of the Bṛhatkathā" (bṛhatkathāsāra) which may refer to the Kathāsaritsāgara.

Another Persian version was commissioned in the second half of the 16th century during Akbar's reign and accomplished by a certain Mustafa Khaliqdad ‘Abbasi also known as the translator of other works. This work was presumably carried out after 1590 following the military annexation of Kashmir. Abbasi named it Darya-yi asmar ("River of Stories") to distinguish it from the Kashmirian translation. In its preface, ʿAbbasi mentions that he was assigned to rewrite an earlier version "of the book barhatkata [...] which the Kashmirian Brahmin Sumdevbat [...] had shortened" and which "someone had undertaken during Zayn al-‘Abidin's reign", being fraught with Arabic expressions, in a more readable style." In conformity with the Sanskrit text, the Persian adaptation is likewise divided into eighteen main chapters, called nahr (rivers), each subdivided into several mauj (waves). This translation was discovered around 1968–69 (National Museum, New Delhi no. 62.1005). It was edited by Dr. Tara Chand and Prof. Syed Amir Hasan Abidi. It is worth mentioning that today only two manuscripts of the Persian version are available; both are incomplete and contain only 8 out of the original 18 chapters of the Sanskrit version each, which Chand and ‘Abidi based their edition upon.

In contrast to other examples from similar kind of literature like Abu al-Maʿali Nasrullah Munshi's Kalila va Dimna, the Darya-yi asmar was retold not in artificial prose (nasr-i musajja‘) aimed at connoisseurs but rather in simple prose with features that remind of an oral recital. In the Persian narrative we encounter a mix of adaptation techniques: some sections display a transfer close to the Indian version, whereas most parts indicate a more narrative approach. This means that special attention was given to the transmission of the narrated story and not to the preservation of as many textual features as possible. One of the adaptation techniques applied in the Kathāsaritsāgara is the use of explanations and glosses to single words that refer to persons, objects or concepts. The translator-compiler ‘Abbāsī remarks, for example, that "this story is elaborated upon in [other] Indian books", or comments on certain passages by adding: "[...] according to the sayings of the people of India [...]." The second type of strategy encountered is that of inserting poetic quotations from the pool of Persian poetry such as Gulistan, Divan-i Hafiz, Divan-i Salman-i Savaji, Manzumat-i Sharaf al-Din Yazdi, Nizami's Khusrau-u-Shirin, Makhzan al-Asrar, Haft paykar, and various others.

=== Printed editions and modern translations ===
Professor H. H. Wilson was the first European scholar who drew the attention of the Western world to this storehouse of fables. In 1824, he gave a summary of the first five books in the Oriental Quarterly Magazine. The first edition of the work was undertaken by Professor Brockhaus. In 1839 he issued the first five chapters only, and it was not until 1862 that the remaining thirteen appeared. Both publications formed part of the Abhandlungen der Deutschen Morgenländischen Gesellschaft.

It was this text which C. H. Tawney used for his excellent translation (Ocean of the River of Streams) published by the Asiatic Society of Bengal in the Bibliotheca Indica, 1880–1884 (the index not appearing till 1887). Brockhaus' edition was based primarily on six MSS., though in the second part of the work he apparently had not so many at his disposal. Tawney was not satisfied with several of Brockhaus' readings, and consequently made numerous fresh renderings or suggestions largely taken from MSS. borrowed from the Calcutta College and from three India Office MSS. lent him by Dr Rost.

In 1889 Durgāprasād issued the Bombay edition, printed at the Nirṇayasāgara Press, which was produced from Brockhaus' edition and two Bombay MSS. This is the latest text now available.

In 1919, N. M. Penzer first approached Tawney with the suggestion of reissuing his Ocean of the River of Streams. But he revised and published Tawney's 2 volumes in 10 volumes in 1924. The first volume gave an introduction of Hindu fiction and the other famous story-collections like Panchatantra, Hitopadesha etc. Volumes 2 to 10 published the original translation with extensive comments. Penzer invited different scholars to write forewords to each volume resulting in nine excellent essays dealing with all aspects of the great collection.

A project to translate the full work into modern English prose, translated by Sir James Mallinson, began to appear in 2007 from the Clay Sanskrit Library, published by New York University Press. The translation was based on the Nirnaya Press's 1915 edition of the Sanskrit text, the edition favored by Sanskritists today. Currently available are 2 volumes of the projected 7-volume edition.

==== Printed editions ====
- Pandit Durgāprasāda; Kāśīnātha Pāṇḍuraṅga Paraba, eds. (1889), The Kathâsaritsâgara of Somadevabhatta, The Nirnaya-Sâgara Press
- Pandit Durgāprasāda; Kāśīnātha Pāṇḍuraṅga Paraba; Wasudev Laxman Shastri Pansikar, eds. (1915), The Kathâsaritsâgara of Somadevabhatta (3rd ed.), The Nirnaya-Sâgara Press

==== Translations ====
- C. H. Tawney (1880–1884), The Kathá sarit ságara; or, Ocean of the streams of story, 2 vols, Vol I, Vol II at the Internet Archive. The only complete translation into English.
- N. M. Penzer (1924–1928), The ocean of story, being C. H. Tawney's translation of Somadeva's Katha sarit sagara (or Ocean of streams of story), 10 vols Vol I, Vol II, Vol III, Vol IV, Vol V, Vol VI, Vol VII, Vol VIII, Vol IX, Vol X at the Internet Archive. Based on Tawney's translation, but greatly expanded, with additional notes and remarks comparing stories from different cultures.
- A. R. Krishnashastry (1952), Kathaamrita (Kannada: ಕಥಾಮೃತ), Geetha Book House, K.R. Circle, Mysore 570 001, India.
- Sir James Mallinson (2007–2009), The Ocean of the Rivers of Story, Clay Sanskrit Library. New York: New York University Press. vol 1, vol 2. intended to be a complete translation in nine volumes, only two volumes, reaching up to canto 6.8, were published before the publisher ended operations.
- P. C. Devassia (1978) Sri Somadevabattante Kathasaritsagaram (samboornagadyavivarthanam. Prose translation of Somadeva's Sanskrit Poem) (Malayalam). Publishers: Sahitya Pravarthaka Cooperative Society Ltd., Kottayam, Kerala State, India. Sold by National Book Stall. Reprinted 1990.
- Arshia Sattar (1997), Tales from the Kathasaritsagara. Penguin. Includes key selections from the Kathasaritsagara.
- Radhavallabh Tripathi, Katha Sarit Sagar (Hindi). National Book Trust. ISBN 9788123714318.

== Influence ==
- The stories and their order in Tantrakhyayika within Book 10 are consistent with the tales and arrangement of the Kalila wa Demna more than even the Panchatantra, and it would appear therefore that we have in the Kathasaritsagara an earlier representative of the original collection than even the Panchatantra, at least as it is now met with.
- The book was a favourite of scholar of Buddhism Herbert V. Guenther, according to Jodi Reneé Lang, Ph.D.
- The idea of a sea of stories was an inspiration for Salman Rushdie's Haroun and the Sea of Stories.

== See also ==
- Hitopadesa
- Kshemendra
- One Thousand and One Nights
