= Bṛhatkathāślokasaṃgraha =

Budhasvāmin's Sanskrit abridgment of the now lost Great Story

Probable relationship between versions of the Brihatkatha

Relationships of chief characters in the Brihatkatha (as evidenced by the derived texts Brihatkathashlokasamgraha, Brihatkathamanjari, and Kathasaritsagara)

Bṛhatkathāślokasaṃgraha (Brihat-katha-shloka-sangraha, बृहत्कथाश्लोकसंग्रह), "Verse Abridgment of the Great Story", is an abridgement into Sanskrit verse of the now lost Great Story (Bṛhatkathā). It tells the legend of the youthful exploits of prince Naravāhanadatta (Nara-vahana-datta). The poet, Budhasvamin (बुधस्वामिन, also transliterated as Budhasvāmin), is known only through this work.

== Story ==
The main story narrates Naravāhanadatta's progress culminating in his destined enthronement as the emperor of the vidhyādharas, celestial beings with magical abilities, winning twenty-six wives along the way. The surviving manuscripts of the text break off while he is in pursuit of his sixth wife. The narrative is fast-paced and eschews lengthy description.

It is also unusually homogeneous and hasn't suffered the intrusion of interpolation: Budha·svamin's laconic style remains consistent throughout. ... Occasional allusions show that Budha·svamin had a thorough grounding in the various sciences that made up the traditional brahmin education ... [and] a wonderfully wide acquaintance with all manner of people and places in the ancient Indian world. The action happens in cities like Ujjayinī [modern Ujjain], Vārānasi [modern Varanasi or Benares], Champa and Madurai, in royal palaces and their harems and parks, in courtesans' parlours and boudoirs, in merchants' mansions, caravans and ships, in paupers' hovels and slums, in outcastes' villages, in ascetics' hermitages, in cremation grounds, on festive pilgrimages, in gambling dens and in jungles, mountains and deserts. The incidental descriptions of these places suggest their authors' personal acquaintance with them.

Somadeva's Kathāsaritsāgara (Ocean of Streams of Story) and Ksemendra's Brhatkathamanjari are other works said ultimately to derive from the same lost Great Story.
