= Somadeva =

11th-century Poet and writer from Kashmir, India

Somadeva Bhatta
- Born: Kashmir, India
- Occupation: Poet, writer
- Language: Sanskrit
- Period: 11th century CE
- Notable works: Kathasaritasagara

Somadeva, also known as Somadeva Bhatta, was an 11th century writer from Kashmir. He is best known for his work Kathasaritsagara.

Somadeva is believed to have lived in Kashmir, a region in the northwestern part of the Indian subcontinent, during the 11th century CE. He was a Shaivite Brahmin scholar and a court poet, serving in the court of King Ananta of Kashmir. Somadeva's most famous work, "Katha Sarit Sagara," is a vast compilation of stories and folktales drawn from various sources, including earlier Indian texts, oral traditions, and the literary heritage of Kashmir. The work is divided into 18 books (or lambakas), each containing a series of interconnected stories within a larger narrative framework. Most of his work was composed under Ananta's patronage and were composed for Ananta's queen, Suryamati, a princess of Jalandhara.
