= Shribhargavaraghaviyam =

Poem composed by Jagadguru Rambhadracharya

श्रीभार्गवराघवीयम्
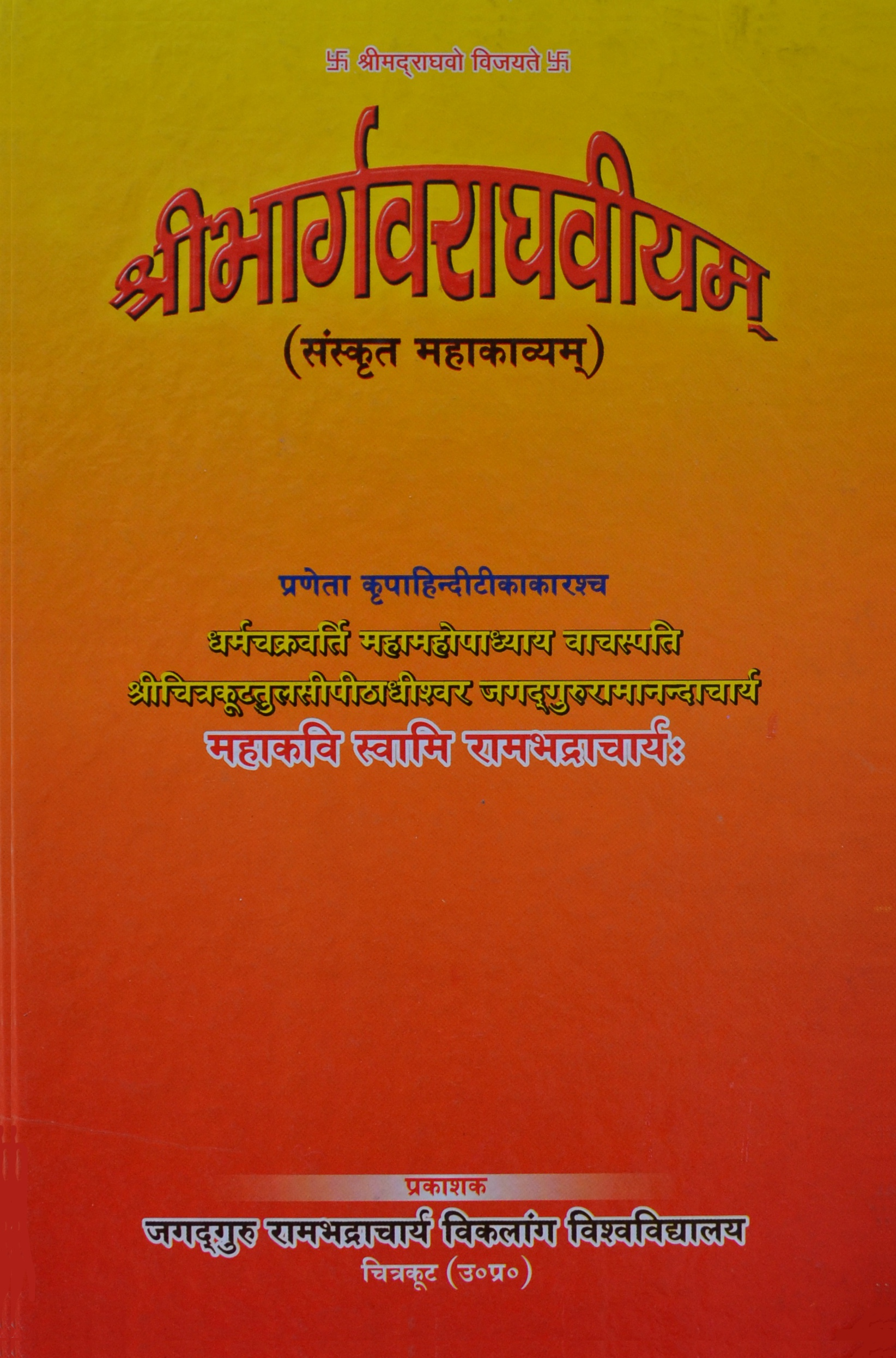
- Cover page of Śrībhārgavarāghavīyam, first edition
- Author: Jagadguru Rāmabhadrācārya
- Original title: Śrībhārgavarāghavīyam
- Language: Sanskrit
- Genre: Epic Poetry
- Publisher: Jagadguru Rambhadracharya Handicapped University
- Publication date: 21 October 2002
- Publication place: India
- Media type: Print (hardcover)
- Pages: 512 pp (first edition)

Śrībhārgavarāghavīyam (Sanskrit: श्रीभार्गवराघवीयम्) (2002), literally Of Paraśurāma and Rāma, is a Sanskrit epic poem (Mahākāvya) composed by Jagadguru Rambhadracharya (1950–). It consists of 2121 verses in 40 Sanskrit and Prakrit metres and is divided into 21 cantos (Sargas) of 101 verses each. The epic is the narrative of the two Rāma Avatars – Paraśurāma and Rāma, which is found in the Rāmāyaṇa and other Hindu scriptures. Bhārgava refers to Paraśurāma, as he incarnated in the family of the sage Bhṛgu, while Rāghava refers to Rāma as he incarnated in the royal dynasty of king Raghu. For the work, the poet was awarded the Sahitya Akademi Award for Sanskrit in 2005, and several other awards.

A copy of the epic with a Hindi commentary by the poet himself was published by the Jagadguru Rambhadracharya Handicapped University, Chitrakuta, Uttar Pradesh. The book was released by the then prime minister of India, Atal Bihari Vajpayee on 30 October 2002.

== Composition ==
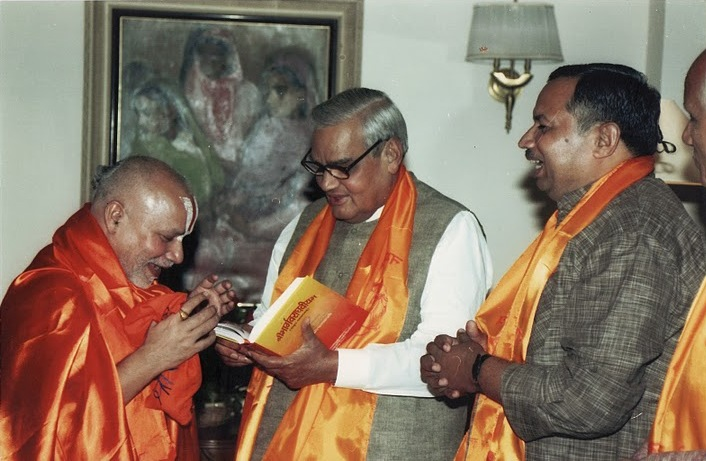
The poet (left) with Atal Bihari Vajpayee at the release of the epic

Jagadguru Rambhadracharya composed the epic in 2002 at Chitrakuta during his sixth six-month Payovrata (milk-only diet). The poet chose 21 as the number of cantos due to several reasons. He composed the epic at the beginning of the 21st century, and it was the first Sanskrit epic to be composed in the 21st century. The number 21 is also associated with the narrative of the epic. Reṇukā, the mother of Paraśurāma, beats her chest 21 times after the Haihaya kings murder her husband Jamadagni. Subsequently, Paraśurāma annihilates the Kṣatriyas 21 times from the earth. One more reason cited by the poet is that the previous Sanskrit epics which are included in the Laghutrayī and Bṛhattrayī – Meghadūtam, Kumārasambhavam, Kirātārjunīyam, Raghuvaṃśam, Śiśupālavadham and Naiṣadhīyacaritam – were composed in 2, 8, 18, 19, 20 and 22 cantos respectively; and the number 21 was missing from this sequence. The poet says that he composed the work as he intended to sing of both the Rāmas – Paraśurāma and Rāma, with the former being the Avatāra, the follower and the Brāhmaṇa and the latter being the Avatārin (source of the Avatār), the leader and the Kṣatriya. Although there is no formal division in the epic, the poet indicates that the epic consists of a first part of nine cantos describing the nine qualities of Paraśurāma, and a second part of 12 cantos in which the brave and noble (Dhīrodātta) protagonist of the epic Rāma is presented with Sītā being the lead female character.

Most of the events described in fifteen cantos of the epic can be found in the Hindu scriptures including Vālmīki's Rāmāyaṇa, Tulasīdāsa's Rāmacaritamānasa, Śrīmadbhāgavata, Brahmavaivartapurāṇa, Prasannarāghava (a play by Jayadeva) and Satyopākhyāna. The narrative of six cantos is original composition by the poet.

== Narrative ==
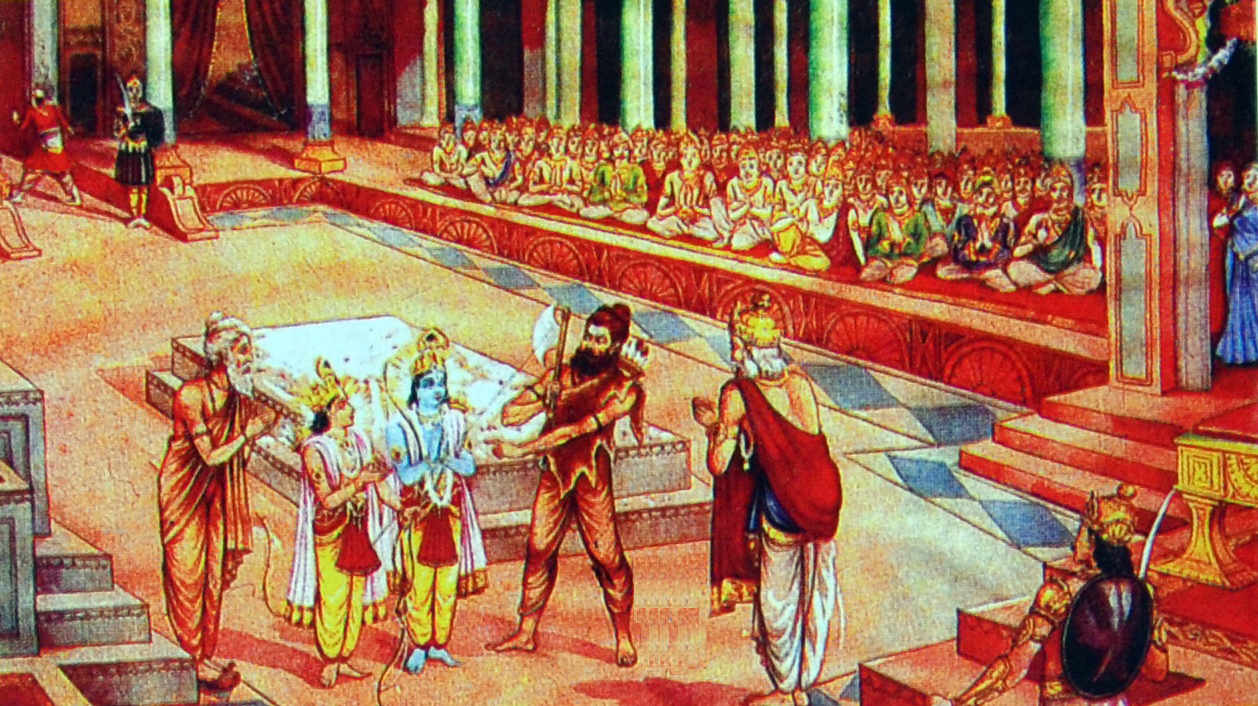
The central characters of Śrībhārgavarāghavīyam as seen in the canto Śrībhārgavalakṣmaṇasaṃvādaḥ. Left to right – Viśvāmitra, Lakṣmaṇa, Rāma, Paraśurāma and Janaka (in the centre); Sunayanā and Sītā (extreme right).

The epic is composed in 21 cantos of 101 verses each. The first nine cantos describe the incarnation of Paraśurāma, his learning from the god Śiva on mount Kailāsa, the execution of his father's command to kill his mother and three brothers and their subsequent resurrection, his battle with the thousand-armed king Sahasrārjuna, the extermination of Kṣatriya ("warrior") race 21 times from the earth by him, and his confrontation with Śiva's son and the god of wisdom, Gaṇeśa. The next five cantos describe the incarnation of Rāma and his consort Sītā, and their child sports (Līlā). The final seven cantos follow the Bālakāṇḍa of the Rāmacaritamānasa, starting from Viśvāmitra's journey to Daśaratha's capital city Ayodhyā and ending with the marriage rites of the four sons of Daśaratha – Rāma being the eldest – in Mithilā.

The summaries of the 21 cantos are given below.

1. Śrībhārgavāvatāropakramaḥ (Sanskrit: श्रीभार्गवावतारोपक्रमः). The poet invokes the blessings of the goddess of learning Sarasvatī, Gaṇeśa, Śiva's consort Pārvatī, Śiva, Sītā and Rāma, and finally the two Rāmas, the subject of the narrative. Bhṛgu, the seventh son of the creator-god Brahmā, and his wife Khyāti beget a son named Ṛcīka in the seventh Manvantara. Ṛcīka marries Satyavatī, the daughter of the Kṣatriya king Gādhi. Ṛcīka prepares two bowls of Pāyasa for Satyavatī and her mother, with Brāhmaṇa and Kṣatriya qualities, respectively. Satyavatī's mother stealthily exchanges the bowls to get a son with Brāhmaṇa qualities (this son would later become Viśvāmitra). On knowing her mother's act, Satyavatī beseeches Ṛcīka to transfer the Kṣatriya qualities to her grandson, as she is afraid of getting a fierce or violent son. Ṛcīka obliges her and the couple get a son named Jamadagni. Jamadagni marries Reṇukā, the daughter of the sage Reṇu. The couple have three sons. For the fourth son, the couple performs penance to please Rāma. Meanwhile, a son named Arjuna is born to the Haihaya king Kṛtavīrya. Arjuna obtains the boon of a thousand arms from Dattātreya, he is subsequently known as Sahasrārjuna ("thousand-Arjuna"). Sahasrārjuna terrorizes the whole world – he stops the flow of the river Narmadā, defeats and incarcerates the demon-king Rāvaṇa (who is later released on the request of Pulastya), and takes over the Svarga ("heaven") and the offerings of the Yajña ("fire sacrifice") from the Devatās ("gods"). The distressed Devatas go to Sāketaloka with Brahmā and pray to Rāma. Rāma tells the Devatās that his Aṃśa will incarnate as the fourth son of Jamadagni and Reṇukā to slay Sahasrārjuna. This Aṃśa would annihilate despotic Kṣatriya races, offer all lands to the sage Kaśyapa, and would finally reenter him in Mithilā. The Devatās go back convinced and Reṇukā becomes pregnant with Rāma entering her womb.
2. Dīkṣā (Sanskrit: दीक्षा). Reṇukā does not feel any weight, nor is troubled by the pregnancy. Jamadagni performs the Puṃsavana ceremony of Reṇukā, traditionally performed in the eighth month of pregnancy. All good omens happen for Reṇukā. The seven seers (Saptarṣi) bless her and the nine planets become favourable. Reṇukā gives birth to a child on the third day of the bright half of Vaiśākha month, known as Akṣayatṛtīyā. The deities, seers, and devotees rejoice. On the instruction of Bhṛgu, the child is named as Rāma by Jamadagni. Rāma is very fond of a toy-axe, and so he is also called Paraśurāma. The child tames and plays with wild animals like lions and tigers. Five years pass by, and ten Saṃskāras ("rites of passage") of the child are completed. Then the Upanayana ("sacred thread ceremony") ceremony of Paraśurāma is performed. Brahmā is the giver of the sacred thread, Śiva initiates the child in the Gayatrī Mantra, and Paraśurāma begs Reṇukā for alms. The canto ends with Paraśurāma going to the Kailāsa mountain to learn from his guru Śiva.
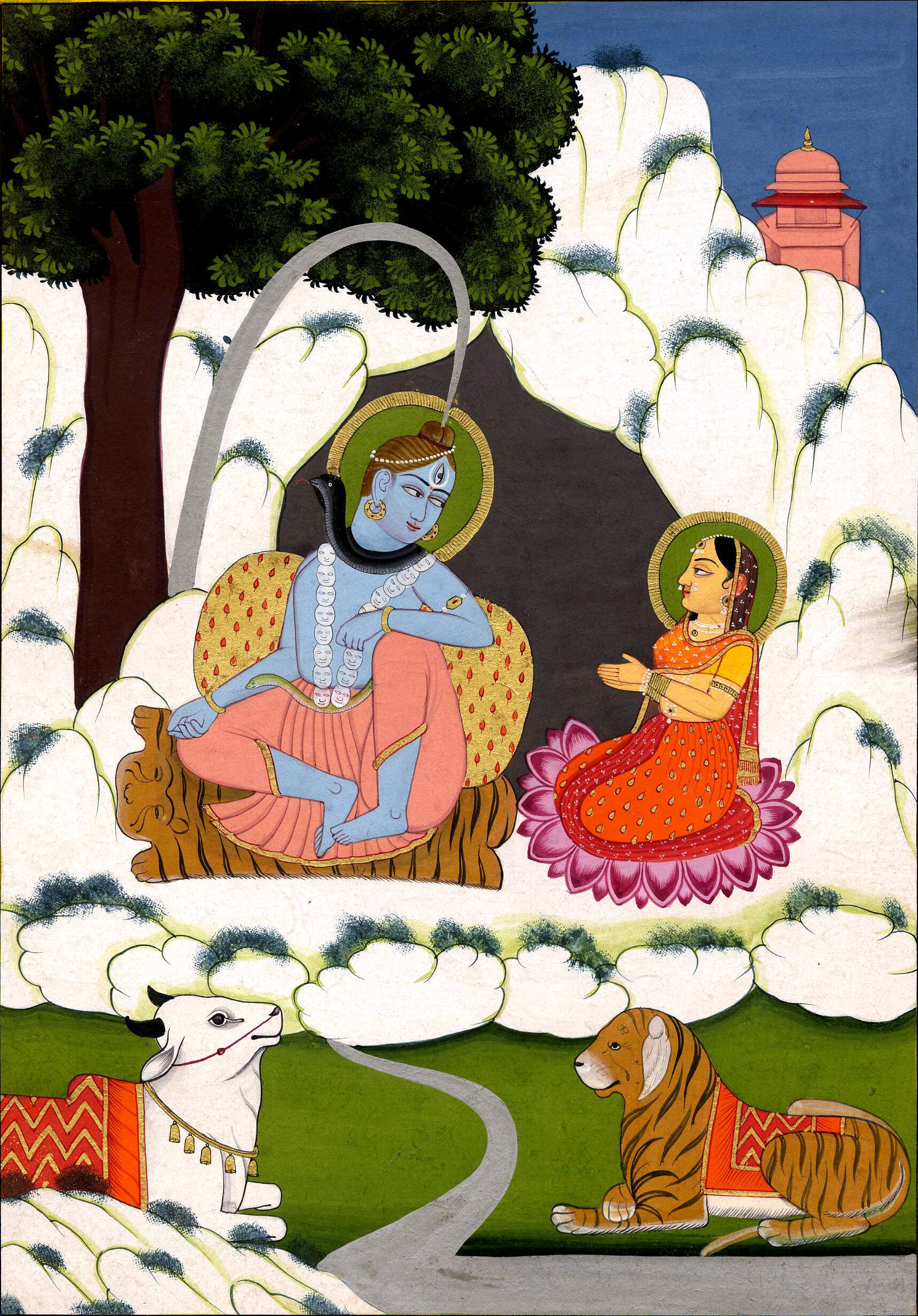
  Śiva and Pārvatī on mount Kailāsa, where Paraśurāma studies in the canto Gurūpasattiḥ.
3. Gurūpasattiḥ (Sanskrit: गुरूपसत्तिः). Paraśurāma is welcomed by Śiva at Kailāsa. Śiva promises to offer all his knowledge to his disciple. Śiva tells Paraśurāma that he knows him to be the Avatāra of Rāma, who knows everything beforehand but is studying from a Guru only to set an example for others. The education of Paraśurāma begins. Paraśurāma masters all Vedic Mantras on just hearing them once from his Guru. Śiva teaches him all the eighteen Vidyās. Paraśurāma serves Śiva like the ideal disciple, waking up early morning, getting water and victuals for his Guru, pleasing Śiva and his consort Pārvatī in every way. The Samāvartana Saṃskāra (end of student life) of Paraśurāma is performed by Śiva, who blesses his disciple by saying that may the eighteen Vidyās be ever with him, and may his weapons be ever virtuous. Śiva orders him to assume a furious form when Rāma breaks Pināka, the bow of Śiva, in Mithilā. Śiva further ordains Paraśurāma to surrender his bow and arrows to Rāma, and to merge his Avatāra into the Rāma Avatāra. For the rest of his life, Paraśurāma is asked to perform penance on the Mahendra mountain. Finally Śiva says that Paraśurāma will be among the seven seers (Saptarṣi) in the eighth Manvantara of Sāvarṇi Manu, just like his father Jamadagni is one in the seventh Manvantara of Vaivasvata Manu. Paraśurāma bows to Śiva and asks permission to leave.
4. Samāvartanam (Sanskrit: समावर्तनम्). Most of the fourth canto deals with description of nature, especially the rainy season and the Āśrama of Jamadagni in the forest. Śiva permits Paraśurāma to leave in order to returns to his parents' home. When Paraśurāma is leaving, Śiva requests the Rāma Avatāra to forgive him if he disrespected him in any way while instructing him as a guru. On hearing this, Paraśurāma has tears in his eyes. After bowing to Śiva and Pārvatī, and meeting their sons Gaṇeśa and Kārttikeya, Paraśurāma sets out to return. The rainy season arrives as Paraśurāma is returning home, and it is described in 44 verses (4.7–4.50). Paraśurāma enters the Āśrama of Jamadagni, which is described in 21 verses (4.61–4.81). Jamadagni and Reṇukā are elated to see their son back. Paraśurāma starts living in the Āśrama and with his actions and character, pleases all the monks and hermits in the Āśrama.
5. Pitrājñāpālanam (Sanskrit: पित्राज्ञापालनम्). Jamadagni requests Paraśurāma to marry and enter the second stage of life, the Gārhasthya Āśrama ("householder's life"). Paraśurāma respectfully turns the request down, saying he wishes to be forever away from the bondage of family. One morning, Reṇukā goes to a lake to fetch water. There she sees the Gandharva king Citraratha, taking delight in the water of the lake with his wife. Reṇukā is attracted to Citraratha and returns home excited, fantasizing about him. Jamadagni senses this and orders his three elder sons to kill their mother who he says has become impure by her adulterous thoughts. When the brothers refuse to carry out his command, Jamadagni asks Paraśurāma to do the same. Paraśurāma is caught between the command of his father, and the indebtedness to mother – he remembers the Smṛti scriptures which says the mother is ten times the greater than the father. After a lot of thought and counter-thought, he decides to obey his father. Paraśurāma beheads his mother and three brothers. Jamadagni is pleased and offers Paraśurāma two wishes. Paraśurāma asks for the resurrection of all four as the first wish, and their loss of memory about their killing as the second one. Jamadagni grants both the wishes and Reṇukā and her three sons get up as if from sleep. Paraśurāma thus satisfies his father and also brings back his mother to life.
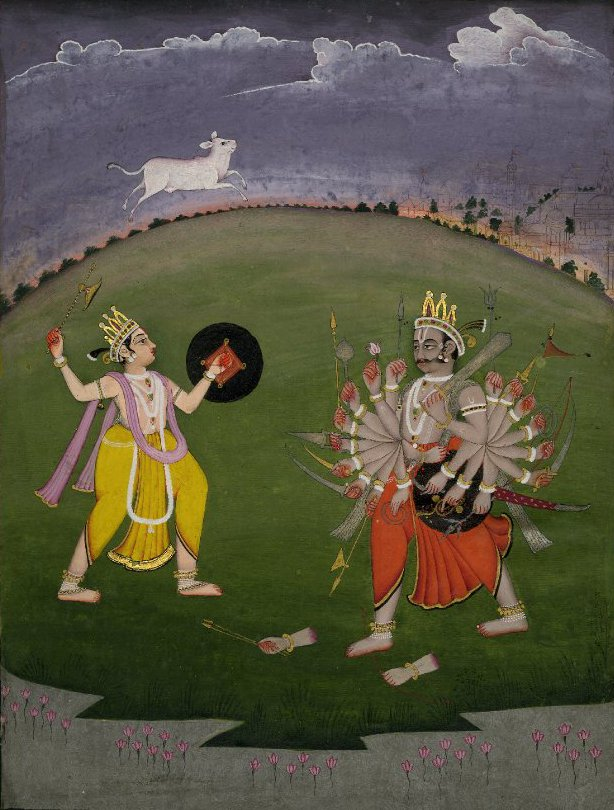
  Paraśurāma chops off the arms of Sahasrārjuna in the canto Sahasrārjunavadhaḥ.
6. Sahasrārjunavadhaḥ (Sanskrit: सहस्रार्जुनवधः). Paraśurāma starts teaching the Vedas. He calls an assembly of Brāhmaṇas ("priest class") in which he discourses about the essential qualities of a Brāhmaṇa and asks them not to deviate from their duties. He then leaves for a desolate forest to perform penance. Sahasrārjuna comes to the Āśrama of Jamadagni when Paraśurāma is away. Jamadagni welcomes him and his army by using the services of the wish-granting cow Kāmadhenu. Sahasrārjuna requests Jamadagni to give Kāmadhenu to him, saying that being the king he deserves all the treasures in his kingdom. When Jamadagni refuses, Sahasrārjuna takes Kāmadhenu away by force to his capital Māhiṣmatī. Paraśurāma is enraged to know this when he returns, and sets out alone to Māhiṣmatī to get Kāmadhenu back. On reaching Māhiṣmatī, he challenges Sahasrārjuna to war, which Sahasrārjuna accepts. Paraśurāma kills Sahasrārjuna's whole army. A fierce battle between Paraśurāma and Sahasrārjuna follows in which the two use divine arrows. Paraśurāma then decides he has let Sahasrārjuna entertain him for long in the theatre of war. Paraśurāma at once splits each of his five hundred bows asunder. Then he destroys the chariot of Sahasrārjuna. Sahasrārjuna then goes and attacks Paraśurāma in a duel. Paraśurāma chops off all the thousand arms of Sahasrārjuna with his axe before using the axe to behead him. The deities extol Paraśurāma for ending the menace of Sahasrārjuna. Paraśurāma returns victorious with Kāmadhenu to his Āśrama and is welcomed by everybody.
7. Tīrthāṭanam (Sanskrit: तीर्थाटनम्) Jamadagni advises Paraśurāma to go on a pilgrimage of various holy places in Bhārata ("ancient India") in order to calm his mind which has been perturbed by the killing of Sahasrārjuna. Paraśurāma first visits the Vaiṣṇava pilgrimages of Citrakūṭa, Ayodhyā, Mathurā, Vṛndāvana, Haridvāra, Māyāpurī (Kanakhala), Kāśī, Kāñcī, Raṅganātha, Avantikā and Dvārikā. Then he visits the Śaiva holy places – the twelve Jyotirliṅgas of Somanātha, Mallikārjuna, Mahākāla, Oṅkāreśvara, Vaidyanātha, Bhīmaśaṅkara, Viśvanātha, Tryambakeśvara, Kedāranātha, Nāgeśvara, Rāmeśvara and Ghuśmeśvara. After this he visits the pilgrimage of Puṣkara. Finally, he visits Prayāga and bathes at the Saṅgama. The poet remarks at the end of the canto that by visiting all these places, Paraśurāma makes the entire land of Bhārata a pilgrimage.
8. Nyastadaṇḍam (Sanskrit: न्यस्तदण्डम्). While Paraśurāma is on his pilgrimage, Sahasrārjuna's sons – the Haihaya princes, attack the Āśrama of Jamadagni to avenge their father's killing. The princes run down everything and everybody that comes their way. Jamadagni is in deep meditation when he is beheaded by the princes, who take his severed head with them to Māhiṣmatī. When Paraśurāma returns, he sees the Āśrama strewn with corpses. He then sees an inconsolable Reṇukā crying near the torso of Jamadagni. When Reṇukā sees Paraśurāma, she beats her chest 21 times saying how could the Haihaya kings kill her husband with Paraśurāma still alive. Paraśurāma places Jamadagni's torso in a boat filled with oil and asks Reṇukā to protect his father's body till he is back. The enraged Paraśurāma goes to Māhiṣmatī all alone and calls out to the Haihayas. He kills their entire army and annihilates the Haihaya race. He then brings back Jamadagni's severed head and attaches it to the torso. Jamadagni is resurrected. Paraśurāma annihilates the race of Kṣatriyas 21 times from the earth, leaving out the dynasties of Raghu and Yadu. After killing 12,000 kings, Paraśurāma creates five huge lakes of blood in Kurukṣetra. Finally, on the request of the sage Kaśyapa, Paraśurāma gives up anger and gives all the lands on the earth to Kaśyapa. He then goes to the Mahendra mountain to perform penance.
9. Ekadantanāśanam (Sanskrit: एकदन्तनाशनम्). On the Mahendra mountain, Paraśurāma meditates on the form of Śiva. He decides that his axe would be calmed only on seeing Śiva. When Paraśurāma reaches Kailāsa, he meets Śiva's son Gaṇeśa at the entrance. Gaṇeśa asks Paraśurāma to wait, as Śiva is performing the afternoon Sandhyā ritual. Paraśurāma gets angry and starts boasting about his valour and axe, to which Gaṇeśa responds by mocking his axe that was used to kill his own mother and infant Kṣatriyas. Paraśurāma is further infuriated and tries to force his way inside, but the elephant-headed Gaṇeśa throws him back using his trunk. Paraśurāma tries to injure Gaṇeśa by throwing his axe at him, which breaks the left tusk of Gaṇeśa. The Bhūtas (goblin attendants) of Śiva attack Paraśurāma to kill him, but Gaṇeśa stops them. Pārvatī arrives and chides Paraśurāma for breaking the tusk of the son of his guru. She curses Paraśurāma by saying that his axe will disappear in Rāma just as the lightning disappears in the clouds, and his bow and arrows, along with his Kalās will all be transferred to Rāma. She further says that the single-tusked Gaṇeśa, who showed restraint by not avenging the breaking of his tusk, will be worshipped everywhere. Paraśurāma pleases Pārvatī and apologizes to Gaṇeśa. He then bows down to Śiva and returns to his Āśrama.
10. Śrīrāghavāvatārapratijñānam (Sanskrit: श्रीराघवावतारप्रतिज्ञानम्). Paraśurāma returns to the Mahendra mountain and contemplates on his past actions. He regrets his acts of rage and fury, and decides to perform penance to atone for the killings in his past. He starts meditating on the form of Rāma. With Sahasrārjuna killed and Paraśurāma putting down his weapons, Rāvaṇa's might is unchallenged and he terrorizes the whole earth – he lifts the Kailāsa mountain, torments the eight Diggajas, wins the kingdom of Indra and terrorizes everybody who performs Dharma. Unable to bear the menace of Rāvaṇa, Pṛthvī takes the form of a cow and goes weeping to the Sumeru mountain. Brahmā has a discussion with Pṛthvī and Śiva. Brahmā then goes to Sāketaloka to see Sītā and Rāma. He eulogizes Rāma in 31 verses (10.56–10.86), beseeching him to take an Avatāra to slay Rāvaṇa. Rāma assures him that he will be soon born as Rāma with his three Viṣṇu Aṃśas – the Viṣṇu in Kṣīrasāgara as Bharata, the Viṣṇu in Vaikuṇṭha as Lakṣmaṇa and Viṣṇu in Śvetadvīpa as Śatrughna. When Brahmā returns assured, Rāma requests Sītā to also take an Avatāra after his Avatāra. He then decides to be born as the son of Kausalyā in Ayodhyā.
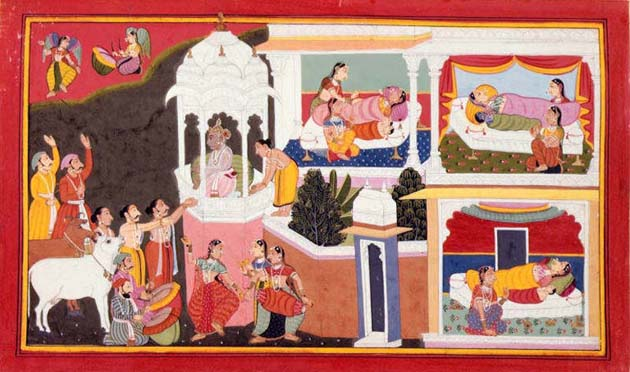
  The birth of the four sons of Daśaratha in the canto Śrīrāghavāvataraṇam.
11. Śrīrāghavāvataraṇam (Sanskrit: श्रीराघवावतरणम्). The first fifteen verses glorify the city of Ayodhyā on the banks of river Sarayū. Daśaratha is the ruler of the kingdom of Ayodhyā. Daśaratha does not have any son for many years. He approaches his Guru Vasiṣṭha and expresses his unfulfilled desire. Vasiṣṭha assures him that he will soon get four sons. After performing the Asvamedha, Viśvajit and Rajasuya sacrifices, Vasiṣṭha calls the sage Ṛṣyaśṛṅga to perform the Putreṣṭi sacrifice for Daśaratha. Agni manifests at the end of the sacrifice with a bowl of Pāyasa. Daśaratha gives half of the Pāyasa to Kausalyā, a fourth to Kaikeyī, and two one-eighth portions to Sumitrā. The three queens become pregnant. Meanwhile, various Devatās take Avatāra in Vānara families, with Śiva being born as Hanumān. After twelve months of the queens' pregnancy, on the ninth day of the bright half of the Caitra month (Rāmanavamī), Rāma manifests as a sixteen-year-old, bearing bow and arrows. On the request of Kausalyā he assumes the form of an infant. Kaikeyī gives birth to Bharata, and Sumitrā delivers two sons – Lakṣmaṇa and Śatrughna. The deities and the subjects of Ayodhyā rejoice at the birth of the four princes. Paraśurāma regales in the meditation of Rāma's child form on Mahendra mountain, singing his glory in 16 verses (11.84–11.99).
12. Śrīmaithilyavataraṇam (Sanskrit: श्रीमैथिल्यवतरणम्). When the four sons of Daśaratha enter their sixth year, their Upanayana ceremony is performed. In the kingdom of Mithilā, the king Sīradhvaja Janaka, a disciple of the seer Yājñavalkya, rules his kingdom as a Yogī. While performing the Somayajña sacrifice in Puṇyāraṇya with his wife Sunayanā, Janaka tills the land using a plough of gold on the ninth day of the bright half of the Vaiśākha month (Sītānavamī). Suddenly, the earth cracks open, and Sītā manifests from the earth as a sixteen-year-old, seated on a golden throne and being served by her eight companions. An Ākāśavāṇī (celestial announcement) declares Sītā to be the daughter of Janaka. Nārada arrives in Mithilā and eulogizes Sītā in 16 verses (12.45–12.60). Then Nārada requests Sītā to assume the form of an infant. The infant Sītā is taken by Janaka and Sunayanā to their palace and raised as their daughter. Once the child Sītā goes to the eastern part of the capital of Janaka. She asks Janaka about a bow that is being worshipped. Janaka tells her it is Pināka, the bow of Śiva, which was given by Śiva himself to his ancestor Devarāta. Sītā tells Janaka that old things should not be worshipped but thrown away, and starts dragging the onerous bow again and again, making it as her play-horse. On Janaka's request, Sītā puts the bow, which could not be lifted by any human or divine being, back in its place. Paraśurāma sees this in his Samādhi on Mahendra mountain and then leaves for Mithilā, wishing to have a sight of the young Sītā.
13. Śrībhārgavamithilāgamanam (Sanskrit: श्रीभार्गवमिथिलागमनम्) In only her sixth year, Sītā's appearance is like that of a sixteen-year-old. Her beauty is described by the poet in 12 verses (13.9–13.20). Janaka realizes that his daughter is the Ādi Śakti of Rāma and no ordinary girl, as she can drag the onerous bow of Śiva as a child. He is concerned about Sītā getting a deserving husband. He thinks about the doctrine of Avatāra, having heard verses about it in the Vedas, but his intellect and rationalism make him not believe it. After much contemplation, he concludes that the doctrine must be true. Just then, a doorkeeper announces the arrival of Paraśurāma in Mithilā. Janaka bows down to Paraśurāma. Knowing Janaka to be a noble king, Paraśurāma does not consider him to be his enemy, unlike the despotic Kṣatriyas. Paraśurāma expresses his wish to see Sītā. Janaka leads him to the sacrificial assembly (Yajñaśālā), where Paraśurāma sees Sītā playing with the bow of Śiva by dragging it like a play-horse. Paraśurāma asks Janaka to hold a Svayaṃvara for Sītā in which the prince who breaks the bow of Śiva will have the right to marry Sītā. Paraśurāma further predicts that Rāma, the descendant of Raghu, will break the bow. Paraśurāma tells Janaka that he will arrive again in Mithilā, pretending to be angry, so that he can have an excuse of seeing both Sītā and Rāma. At the end of the canto Paraśurāma bows to the child Sītā and starts to praise her.
14. Śrīsītāstavanam (Sanskrit: श्रीसीतास्तवनम्). The entire canto is a eulogy. Paraśurāma praises Sītā in 99 verses (14.1–14.99). He then experiences peace and pleasantly leaves for Mahendra mountain after bowing to Sītā.
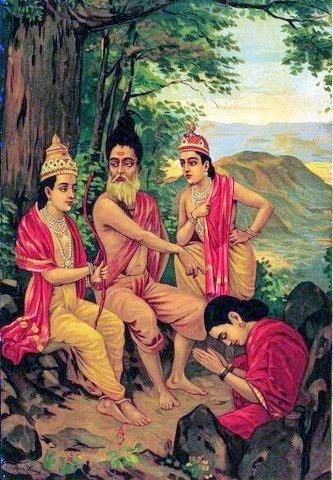
  Rāma redeems Ahalyā in the canto Ahalyoddharaṇam
15. Ahalyoddharaṇam (Sanskrit: अहल्योद्धरणम्). Janaka fixes the day of Sītā's Svayaṃvara after counseling with his ministers and priests. Meanwhile, in Ayodhyā, Daśaratha starts thinking about Rāma's marriage. The sage Viśvāmitra is interrupted again and again in his sacrifice by the female demon Tāṭakā. Viśvāmitra arrives in Daśaratha's court and asks for Rāma and Lakṣmaṇa for protecting his sacrifice from demons. Daśaratha is reluctant and desolate at the thought of Rāma leaving him, but Vasiṣṭha convinces him to relent. Viśvāmitra takes Rāma and Lakṣmaṇa to his forest where Rāma kills Tāṭakā when she attacks the three by raining trees and rocks at them. Viśvāmitra grants the two Vidyās names Balā and Atibalā to Rāma and Lakṣmaṇa, which will enable them to survive without drinking, eating or sleeping. Viśvāmitra also surrenders all his divine weapons to Rāma. Rāma and Lakṣmaṇa protect the sacrifice of Viśvāmitra for six days and six nights. On the seventh day, the demon brothers Mārīca and Subāhu attack the sacrifice with a large army. Rāma uses the Mānavāstra to throw the elder brother Mārīca across the ocean, while he burns Subāhu to death by the Āgneyāstra. In the meantime Lakṣmaṇa kills the entire army of demons. Viśvāmitra is freed from the fear of demons and decides to take Rāma and Lakṣmaṇa to Mithilā for the Svayaṃvara of Sītā. On the way, Rāma sights Ahalyā, who has been cursed by her husband Gautama for her adulterous transgression, in the form of a rock. Viśvāmitra narrates the history of Ahalyā to Rāma. Rāma touches Ahalyā by his foot and Ahalyā is freed of her curse and sin. Ahalyā praises Rāma with tears in her eyes and departs to the abode of Gautama.
16. Śrīrāghavapriyādarśanam (Sanskrit: श्रीराघवप्रियादर्शनम्). Viśvāmitra, Rāma and Lakṣmaṇa arrive in Mithilā. Rāma is pleased to be in the city of Mithilā, but the other kings who have come in Sītā's Svayaṃvara are not pleased about his arrival. The people of Mithilā experience bliss in seeing Rāma. When Janaka asks Viśvāmitra about the two princes, Viśvāmitra introduces Rāma and Lakṣmaṇa to Janaka. Janaka takes both princes to his palace and welcomes them. Later Lakṣmaṇa wishes to see the city of Mithilā and Rāma accompanies him. The children of Mithilā take Rāma and Lakṣmaṇa around the city, and embrace Rāma in the end. Early morning on the next day, Rāma and Lakṣmaṇa go to the royal garden of Janaka to get flowers for Viśvāmitra's worship. Sītā arrives in the same garden to worship Pārvatī on the day before her Svayaṃvara. Sītā and Rāma see each other for the first time when they come face-to-face in the garden. Rāma tells Lakṣmaṇa about the attraction he feels for Sītā. He tells Lakṣmaṇa that Sītā must be his wife in future, for even in his dreams his mind never longs for the wife of another. Lakṣmaṇa then bows to Sītā, thinking of her as his mother. Sītā worships Rāma in her mind and then departs for her palace after worshipping Pārvatī. Rāma and Lakṣmaṇa return to Viśvāmitra and worship him with the flowers from Janaka's royal garden. Rāma tells Viśvāmitra everything about the attraction he felt for Sītā. Viśvāmitra blesses Rāma and goes to sleep. Rāma is awake in the night, admiring the beauty of the moon which reminds him of the face of Sītā.
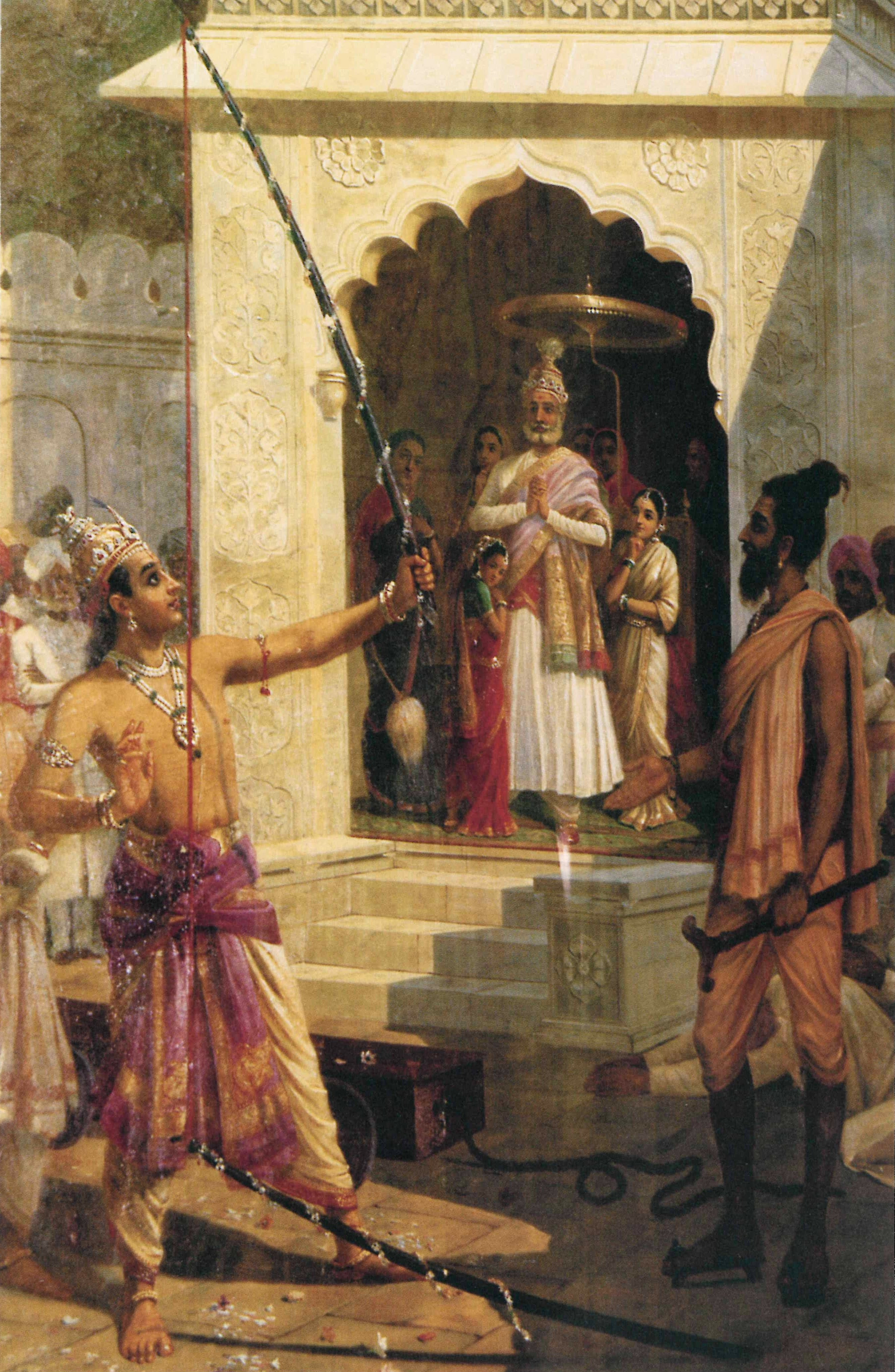
  Rāma breaks the Pināka in the canto Sītāsvayaṃvaram
17. Sītāsvayaṃvaram (Sanskrit: सीतास्वयंवरम्). Rāma and Lakṣmaṇa get up next morning and bow to Viśvāmitra. The three come together to the Svayaṃvara of Sītā. The children, youth and elderly, and the maidens of Mithilā are enraptured by the sight of Rāma. Janaka sees Rāma and prays in his mind that Rāma breaks the bow of Śiva. The twelve different groups of people in the assembly at Sītā's Svayaṃvara view Rāma with twelve different emotions (Rasas). The Charanas in Mithilā announce the vow of Janaka – the prince who is able to string the Pināka, the bow of Śiva, will have the right to marry Sītā. Many kings in the assembly, including Bāṇāsura and Rāvaṇa try to lift the bow but are unsuccessful. Ten thousand kings endeavour to lift the bow together but are not able to. Janaka is disappointed and asks all kings to go home, saying that he would rather Sītā remain a spinster if the earth has become devoid of the brave. On hearing Janaka's words, Lakṣmaṇa expresses his anger in the assembly but Rāma calms him down with the gesture of his eyes. Viśvāmitra orders Rāma to break the bow. Rāma lifts the bow as if it were a straw and breaks it into two instantly. Amidst the chanting of Vedic Mantras by Viśvāmitra, Sītā garlands Rāma. Janaka acclaims Rāma by bowing to him.
18. Śrībhārgavalakṣmaṇasaṃvādaḥ (Sanskrit: श्रीभार्गवलक्ष्मणसंवादः). On Mahendra mountain, Paraśurāma learns that Rāma has broken the Pināka in Mithilā. He also senses that some malevolent kings are planning to take Sītā away by force and imprison Rāma and Lakṣmaṇa, even though they failed to move the bow of Śiva. Remembering the words of his Guru, Paraśurāma comes in the assembly of Mithilā acting angry as a part of his final Līlā. His presence terrifies all the Kṣatriya kings in the assembly and they are tamed. Janaka bows down to Paraśurāma and makes Sītā bow down to him as well. Paraśurāma feigns ignorance and asks Janaka to show him the offender who broke the bow of his Guru. Rāma respectfully tells Paraśurāma that the destroyer of the bow could only be his (Paraśurāma's) slave, and requests his refuge. Paraśurāma tells Rāma to act like a slave and carry out his order of separating the offender from the crowd. Lakṣmaṇa is enraged on seeing Paraśurāma insulting Rāma and replies back mocking Paraśurāma. A verbal duel between the two follows in which Lakṣmaṇa replies with witty rebuttals to Paraśurāma threats. When Lakṣmaṇa repeatedly counters all threats by making fun of Paraśurāma, Paraśurāma raises his axe and lunges forward to kill Lakṣmaṇa. Just then, Rāma starts speaking to calm Paraśurāma down.
19. Śrīrāghave Bhārgavapraveśaḥ (Sanskrit: श्रीराघवे भार्गवप्रवेशः). Rāma counters the rage of Paraśurāma by his gentle words. Rāma accepts that he has indeed broken the bow, but only on orders of Viśvāmitra. He calls Paraśurāma as his Guru and himself as Paraśurāma's disciple. Rāma apologizes to Paraśurāma for the insulting speech of Lakṣmaṇa. While Rāma speaks thus, Lakṣmaṇa giggles again at Paraśurāma. This further infuriates Paraśurāma who now challenges Rāma to a duel, saying he is no ordinary Brāhmaṇa. Rāma respectfully tells Paraśurāma that duel is only between equals, and he is not worthy of having a duel with Paraśurāma. He tells Paraśurāma that he (Rāma) is omnipotent but still a slave of the Brāhmaṇas. Then Rāma reveals his Mahāviṣṇu form to Paraśurāma, showing the mark of Bhṛgu's foot on his chest. On seeing the footprint of his ancestor, Paraśurāma gives up the pretence of anger. He asks Rāma to string the bow of Viṣṇu named Śārṅga. As he hands over the Śārṅga to Rāma, his axe disappears, and all his weapons go and dissolve into Rāma. His aura also enters Rāma. Rāma strings the Vaiṣṇava bow and places an arrow on it. Paraśurāma's pretence of doubt is also over. Paraśurāma then praises Rāma in twelve verses (19.63–19.76). Rāma tells Paraśurāma that his arrow is infallible. He asks Paraśurāma if he should use the arrow to destroy Paraśurāma's ability to move freely on earth, or if he should destroy the fruits earned by Paraśurāma with his penance. Rāma again gently reveals his Mahāviṣṇu form to Paraśurāma, and then falls at the feet of Paraśurāma to ask for his orders. Amidst acclaims from everybody in the assembly, Paraśurāma embraces Rāma and asks hims to get up from his feet. He then asks Rāma to destroy the fruits of his penance and not his mobility. Rāma does the same. Paraśurāma starts to praise Rāma.
20. Śrībhārgavakṛtarāghavastavanam (Sanskrit: श्रीभार्गवकृतराघवस्तवनम्). The entire canto is a eulogy. Paraśurāma praises Rāma in 100 verses (20.1–20.100). Paraśurāma ends the praise by pleading for his protection, wishing that Sītā and Rāma forever reside in his mind, and acknowledging his lack of knowledge and the omniscience of Rāma. He then ends his Avatāra, experiences bliss and then leaves after hailing Rāma.
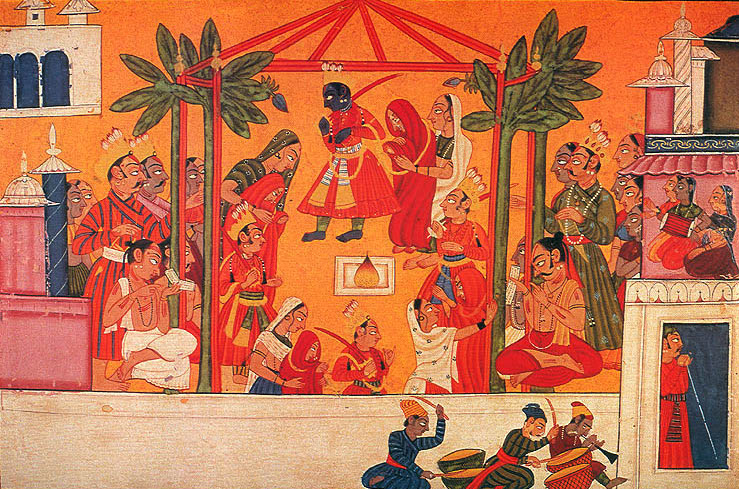
  The four sons of Daśaratha get married with the four daughters of Sīradhvaja and Kuśadhvaja in the canto Śrīrāghavapariṇayaḥ
21. Śrīrāghavapariṇayaḥ (Sanskrit: श्रीराघवपरिणयः). Rāma sends Paraśurāma back to the Mahendra mountain. Rāma and Lakṣmaṇa approach their Guru Viśvāmitra and fall at his feet. Viśvāmitra embraces Rāma. Janaka expresses his indebtedness to Viśvāmitra. Viśvāmitra orders Janaka to send invitations to Daśaratha. Janaka's couriers reach Ayodhyā and narrate the achievements of Rāma and Lakṣmaṇa to Daśaratha before inviting him to Mithilā. Daśaratha leads the marriage procession which is arraigned by Bharata. When the procession arrives at Mithilā, Rāma and Lakṣmaṇa fall at Daśaratha's feet. Daśaratha embraces both the sons. Then the brothers bow down to Vasiṣṭha. Finally they meet their brothers Bharata and Śatrughna, and their companions. The fifth day of the bright half of Mārgaśīrṣa month arrives, which is the date fixed for the marriage of Rāma and Sītā. Sītā is adorned for the occasion by her companions. Rāma arrives to the Maṇḍapa (marriage hall) on a horse. Janaka performs the Pāṇigrahaṇa Saṃskāra of Sītā and Rāma. The other daughter of Janaka and the two daughters of his younger brother Kuśadhvaja marry the three brothers of Rāma. Māṇḍavī is married to Bharata, Ūrmilā is married to Lakṣmaṇa and Śrutikīrti is married to Śatrughna. The people of Mithilā and Ayodhyā rejoice. The people of Ayodhyā leave for home with the brides, who are bid a tearful farewell by Mithilā. In the final verses of the canto (21.97–21.99), the poet briefly summarizes the remaining events of the Rāmāyaṇa after the marriage – the four brothers arrive at Ayodhyā with their wives and the mothers are delighted. Rāma spends the next twelve years in Ayodhyā and then leaves for the forest following the orders of Kaikeyī. Rāma slays Rāvaṇa for abducting Sītā, returns to the throne of Ayodhyā with Sugrīva and Hanumān, and is again bowed to by Paraśurāma.

== Poetic features ==
=== Figures of speech ===
A comprehensive listing of the figures of speech used in Śrībhārgavarāghavīyam is provided by Dinkar. Some examples of figures of speech used in the epic are given below.

==== Alliteration ====
An example use of alliteration (14.28) from the praise of Sītā by Paraśurāma has eleven consecutive words beginning with the same letter –

Devanagari
रामप्राणप्रिये रामे रमे राजीवलोचने ।
राहि राज्ञि रतिं रम्यां रामे राजनि राघवे ॥

IAST
rāmaprāṇapriye rāme rame rājīvalocane ।
rāhi rājñi ratiṃ ramyāṃ rāme rājani rāghave ॥

O the one who is as dear as life to Rāma, O the delightful one, O the power of Rāma, O the one with eyes like lotuses, O queen, O Sītā, grant me the most beautiful devotion towards Rāma. ॥ 14.28 ॥

Two examples of use of alliteration mixed with Yamaka (6.3 and 16.84) occur in the sixth and sixteenth cantos -

Devanagari
स ब्रह्मचारी निजधर्मचारी स्वकर्मचारी च न चाभिचारी ।
चारी सतां चेतसि नातिचारी स चापचारी स न चापचारी ॥

IAST
sa brahmacārī nijadharmacārī svakarmacārī ca na cābhicārī ।
cārī satāṃ cetasi nāticārī sa cāpacārī sa na cāpacārī ॥

He (Paraśurāma) observed celibacy, observed Dharma, observed his duties, and did not act wrongly [towards anyone]. He moved about (lived) in the hearts of the virtuous, and never transgressed. He roamed about with his bow, but never hurt [anyone]. ॥ 6.3 ॥

Devanagari
वीक्ष्य तां वीक्षणीयाम्बुजास्यश्रियं
स्वश्रियं श्रीश्रियं ब्रह्मविद्याश्रियम् ।
धीधियं ह्रीह्रियं भूभुवं भूभुवं
राघवः प्राह सल्लक्षणं लक्ष्मणम् ॥

IAST
vīkṣya tāṃ vīkṣaṇīyāmbujāsyaśriyaṃ
svaśriyaṃ śrīśriyaṃ brahmavidyāśriyam ।
dhīdhiyaṃ hrīhriyaṃ bhūbhuvaṃ bhūbhuvaṃ
rāghavaḥ prāha sallakṣaṇaṃ lakṣmaṇam ॥

On observing his Mahālakṣmī, the beauty of whose face was like that of a spectacular lotus, the brilliance of brilliance, the Lakṣmī (prosperity) of Lakṣmī (prosperity), the brilliance of the knowledge of Brahman, the intellect of intellect, the modesty of modesty, the earth (bearer) of the earth, and the daughter of the earth, Rāma said to Lakṣmaṇa, characterized by good qualities. ॥ 16.84 ॥

==== Metaphor ====
In the following verse (6.97), the poet describes how Sahasrārjuna is killed by Paraśurāma, using the metaphor (Rūpaka) of a priest performing a fire sacrifice (Yajña).

Devanagari
धनुःस्रुगभिमेदुरे भृगुपकोपवैश्वानरे
रणाङ्गणसुचत्वरे सुभटराववेदस्वरे ।
शराहुतिमनोहरे नृपतिकाष्ठसञ्जागरे
सहस्रभुजमध्वरे पशुमिवाजुहोद्भार्गवः ॥

IAST
dhanuḥsrugabhimedure bhṛgupakopavaiśvānare
raṇāṅgaṇasucatvare subhaṭarāvavedasvare ।
śarāhutimanohare nṛpatikāṣṭhasañjāgare
sahasrabhujamadhvare paśumivājuhodbhārgavaḥ ॥

In the great fire-sacrifice of the battle – in which the bow was the beautiful ladle, Paraśurāma's anger was the fire, the battlefield was the quadrangular fire-place (Vedikā or altar), the cries of the brave soldiers were the Vedic chants, the arrows of Paraśurāma were the fascinating oblations (Āhutis), and the kings were the wood – Paraśurāma sacrificed Sahasrārjuna like a sacrifice animal. ॥ 6.97 ॥

==== Pun ====
Yamaka is a kind of pun in Sanskrit and Prakrit where the same word occurs more than once and each occurrence of the word has a unique meaning. The following verse (3.26) from the third canto of the epic has the same four feet, but the same syllables stand for four different meanings, one meaning in each foot. Such use of quadruple Yamaka spanning the entire verse is also called Mahāyamaka.

Devanagari
ललाममाधुर्यसुधाभिरामकं ललाममाधुर्यसुधाभिरामकम् ।
ललाममाधुर्यसुधाभिरामकं ललाममाधुर्यसुधाभिरामकम् ॥

IAST
lalāmamādhuryasudhābhirāmakaṃ lalāmamādhuryasudhābhirāmakam ।
lalāmamādhuryasudhābhirāmakaṃ lalāmamādhuryasudhābhirāmakam ॥

Him, who was with the charm of the Tripuṇḍra and whose favourite deity was Rāma; him, who was bearing the axle of the lustre of the ornament [in the form of the nascent moon] and who was agreeable by this joy; him, who was the protector of the bearer of the onus of Dharma with the power of his eminence; and him, who was endowed with the refuge of Rāma owing to the pleasantness of the resplendence of the bull-sign which stands for righteousness. ॥ 3.26 ॥

==== Mudrā ====
In the Mudrā figure of speech, the metre used to compose the verse is indicated by the use of its name in the verse. This figure of speech is used eight times in the epic, with seven different metres as shown below.

| Verse | Metre | Quarter | Devanagari | IAST | Meaning of Mudrā word |
| 8.100 | Śikhariṇī | 4 | निजारामो रामो विलसति महेन्द्रे शिखरिणि॥ | nijārāmo rāmo vilasati mahendre śikhariṇi॥ | on the mountain |
| 11.83 | Śikhariṇī | 4 | जगौ द्यष्टौ भक्त्या रघुतिलककीर्तीः शिखरिणीः॥ | jagau dyaṣṭau bhaktyā raghutilakakīrtīḥ śikhariṇīḥ॥ | Śikhariṇī verses |
| 12.45 | Āryā | 1 | आर्ये रघुवरभार्ये | ārye raghuvarabhārye | O Noble woman! |
| 16.76 | Sragviṇī | 2 | भव्यनीलाम्बरा स्त्रीवरा स्रग्विणी। | bhavyanīlāmbarā strīvarā sragviṇī। | bearing a garland |
| 17.97 | Śārdūlavikrīḍitam | 4 | त्रैलोक्ये च विजृम्भितं हरियशःशार्दूलविक्रीडितम्॥ | trailokye ca vijṛmbhitaṃ hariyaśaḥśārdūlavikrīḍitam॥ | act like that of a lion |
| 17.100 | Pṛthvī | 4 | नमोऽस्त्विति समभ्यधाद्रघुवराय पृथ्वीपतिः॥ | namo'stviti samabhyadhādraghuvarāya pṛthvīpatiḥ॥ | earth |
| 19.85 | Puṣpitāgrā | 4 | त्रिजगति राम रमस्व पुष्पिताग्राम्॥ | trijagati rāma ramasva puṣpitāgrām॥ | flowered |
| 20.91 | Kanakamañjarī | 1 | कनकमञ्जरीकान्तिवल्लरी- | kanakamañjarīkāntivallarī- | golden creeper |

=== Prosody ===
The poet uses as many as 40 Sanskrit and Prakrit metres, namely Acaladhṛti (Gītyāryā), Anuṣṭubh, Āryā, Indirā (Kanakamañjarī), Indravajrā, Indravaṃśā, Upajāti, Upendravajrā, Upodgatā (Mālabhāriṇī or Vasantamālikā, a type of Aupacchandasika), Kavitta, Kirīṭa (Meduradanta, a type of Sapādikā), Kokilaka (Nārkuṭika), Gītaka, Ghanākṣarī, Toṭaka, Duramilā (Dvimilā, a type of Sapādikā), Dodhaka, Drutavilambita, Nagasvarūpaṇī (Pañcacāmara), Puṣpitāgrā (a type of Aupacchandasika), Prthivī, Praharṣiṇī, Bhjaṅgaprayāta, Mattagajendra (a type of Sapādikā), Mandākrāntā, Mālinī, Rathoddhatā, Vaṃśastha, Vasantatilakā, Śārdūlavikrīḍita, Śālinī, Śikhariṇī, Śaṭpada, Sundarī (Vaitālika or Vaitālīya), Surabhi (a type of Aupacchandasika), Sragdharā, Sragviṇi, Svāgatā, Harigītaka, and Hariṇī.

==== Short syllabled verses ====
There are seven verses in the seventh canto (7.11 to 7.17) of Śrībhārgavarāghavīyam composed in the Acaladhṛti (Gītyāryā) metre, which consists of only the short syllables in Sanskrit. The poet remarks that Paraśurāma extols the forest of Citrakūṭa in short syllables only, due to the feeling of humility. Two examples are –

Devanagari
त्रिजगदवन हतहरिजननिधुवन
निजवनरुचिजितशतशतविधुवन ।
तरुवरविभवविनतसुरवरवन
जयति विरतिघन इव रघुवरवन ॥
मदनमथन सुखसदन विधुवदन-
गदितविमलवरविरुद कलिकदन ।
शमदमनियममहित मुनिजनधन
लससि विबुधमणिरिव हरिपरिजन ॥

IAST
trijagadavana hataharijananidhuvana
nijavanarucijitaśataśatavidhuvana ।
taruvaravibhavavinatasuravaravana
jayati viratighana iva raghuvaravana ॥
madanamathana sukhasadana vidhuvadana-
gaditavimalavaraviruda kalikadana ।
śamadamaniyamamahita munijanadhana
lasasi vibudhamaṇiriva hariparijana ॥

O the protector of the three worlds; O the remover of the mortal pleasures of the devotees of the Hari; O the one, the resplendence of whose waters win over the brilliance of hundreds of moons; O the one who makes the Nandanavana (forest of the deities) bow down with the majesty of its great trees; O the forest of best among the descendants of Rāghu, you shine forth like the dense treasure of abstention. ॥ 7.11 ॥

O the abode of pleasure for the tormentor of lust (Śiva); O the one whose immaculate and great panegyric has been sung by the one having the face of the moon (Rāma); O the destroyer of the [vices of] Kaliyuga; O the one who is celebrated by the [virtues like] tranquility, self-restraint and piety; O the wealth of the sages; O the attendant of Rāma; you are resplendent like the Cintāmaṇi gem. ॥ 7.12 ॥

==== Prakrit metres in Sanskrit ====
The 20th canto has 72 Sanskrit verses (20.1–20.72) composed in Prakrit metres, namely Kirīṭa (Meduradanta, a type of Sapādikā), Ghanākṣarī, Duramilā (Dvimilā, a type of Sapādikā), Mattagajendra (a type of Sapādikā), Śaṭpada and Harigītaka. The language of the verses in Sanskrit, but the metres and the prosody rules follow Prakrit prosody. An example is the following verse (20.13) in the Ghanākṣarī metre, which consists of 32 syllables in every foot.

Devanagari
अशरणशरण प्रणतभयदरण
धरणिभरहरण धरणितनयावरण
जनसुखकरण तरणिकुलभरण
कमलमृदुचरण द्विजाङ्गनासमुद्धरण ।
त्रिभुवनभरण दनुजकुलमरण
निशितशरशरण दलितदशमुखरण
भृगुभवचातकनवीनजलधर राम
विहर मनसि सह सीतया जनाभरण ॥

IAST
aśaraṇaśaraṇa praṇatabhayadaraṇa
dharaṇibharaharaṇa dharaṇitanayāvaraṇa
janasukhakaraṇa taraṇikulabharaṇa
kamalamṛducaraṇa dvijāṅganāsamuddharaṇa ।
tribhuvanabharaṇa danujakulamaraṇa
niśitaśaraśaraṇa dalitadaśamukharaṇa
bhṛgubhavacātakanavīnajaladhara rāma
vihara manasi saha sītayā janābharaṇa ॥

O the refuge of those without refuge, O the destroyer of the fear of those who bow down [to you], O the remover of the earth's burden, O the paramour of the daughter of the earth, O the cause of pleasure in devotees, O the nourisher of the dynasty of the sun, O the one with feet as delicate as the lotus, O the redeemer of the wife of the Brahmin (Ahalyā), O the nourisher of the three worlds, O the slayer of the clan of demons, O the bearer of sharp arrows, O the destroyer of Rāvaṇa in battle, O the new cloud for the Cātaka bird in the form of the descendant of Bhṛgu (Paraśurāma), O Rāma, O the ornament of devotees, take pleasure in my mind with Sītā. ॥ 20.13 ॥

=== Rasas ===
The principal Rasa (emotion or mood) of Śrībhārgavarāghavīyam is the Vīra Rasa (the emotion of heroism). Like the previously composed Mahākāvyas, Śrībhārgavarāghavīyam has all the eight Rasas as enunciated by Bharata Muni. These Rasas are – Śringāra (eros and beauty), Vīra (heroism or bravery), Hāsya (mirth), Raudra (fury), Karuṇa (compassion), Bībhatsa (disgust), Bhayānaka (horror), Adbhuta (amazement). Apart from this Śrībhārgavarāghavīyam also has the ninth Rasa as propounded by Mammaṭa – the Śānta Rasa (calmness), and the three new Rasas as – Bhakti (devotion), Vatsala (parental love) and Preyas (love).

Like the 10th canto of Śrīmad Bhāgavatam and Bālakāṇḍa of the Rāmacaritamānasa, twelve verses in the seventeenth canto (17.42–17.53) of Śrībhārgavarāghavīyam have all the twelve Rasas used in the same context. Here the poet describes how twelve different groups of people in the assembly at Mithilā look at Rāma, each group feeling one of the above twelve emotions. The context is the same as in Rāmacaritamānasa.

=== Single consonant verses ===
Śrībhārgavarāghavīyam has three verses composed using only a single consonant (Ekākṣariślokas). The three Ekākṣariślokas are in the 20th canto of Śrībhārgavarāghavīyam (20.92–20.94).

Devanagari
कः कौ के केककेकाकः काककाकाककः ककः ।
काकः काकः ककः काकः कुकाकः काककः कुकः ॥
काककाक ककाकाक कुकाकाक ककाक क ।
कुककाकाक काकाक कौकाकाक कुकाकक ॥
लोलालालीललालोल लीलालालाललालल ।
लेलेलेल ललालील लाल लोलील लालल ॥

IAST
kaḥ kau ke kekakekākaḥ kākakākākakaḥ kakaḥ ।
kākaḥ kākaḥ kakaḥ kākaḥ kukākaḥ kākakaḥ kukaḥ ॥
kākakāka kakākāka kukākāka kakāka ka ।
kukakākāka kākāka kaukākāka kukākaka ॥
lolālālīlalālola līlālālālalālala ।
lelelela lalālīla lāla lolīla lālala ॥

The Supreme God (kaḥ) (Rāma) [is resplendent] on [both] the earth (kau) and in Sāketaloka (ke); from him there is pleasure in the universe and in the sound of the peacock (kekakekākaḥ); he takes pleasure and bliss in the caw of the [Kākabhuśuṇḍi] crow (kākakākākakaḥ); from him there is pleasure for all the worlds (kakaḥ); for him the pain [of exile] is a pleasure (kākaḥ); his crow ([Kākabhuśuṇḍi]) is praiseworthy (kākaḥ); from him there is pleasure for Brahmā (kakaḥ); he calls out [to the devotees] (kākaḥ); from him there is pleasure for Kukā or Sītā (kukākaḥ); he calls out to the [Kākabhuśuṇḍi] crow (kākakaḥ); and from him there are worldly fruits and the bliss of liberation (kukaḥ). ॥ 20.92 ॥

O the one who from whom there was pain on the head of the [Jayanta] crow (kākakāka); O the one from whom there is pleasure in [all] beings (kaka); please come, please come (āka āka); O the one from whom there is pleasure for Sītā (kukāka); please come (āka); O the one from whom there is pleasure for the universe (kaka); please come (āka); O Lord (ka); O one who invites to himself those who find pleasure in the [mortal] world (kukaka); please come, please come (āka āka); O the one from whom there is pleasure for both Brahmā and Viṣṇu (kāka); please come (āka); O the one from whom there is pleasure on the earth (kauka); please come, please come (āka āka); O the one who is called out to [for protection] by the evil crow [Jayanta] (kukākaka), [please come]. ॥ 20.93 ॥

O the one who is playful with a row of locks of wavering hair (lolālālīlala); O the one who never changes (alola); O the one whose mouth is full of saliva in the pastimes [as a child] (līlālālālalālala); O the one who accepts the wealth of earth (Sītā) in the sport [of breaking the bow of Śiva] (lelelela); O the one who destroys the multitude of worldly desires of mortals (lalālīla); O the child [form of Rāma] (lāla); O the one who destroys the fickle-minded nature of the being (lolīla); [may you ever] delight [in my mind] (lālala). ॥ 20.94 ॥

== Comparison with other Sanskrit epics ==
Some features of the epic compared with previous Mahākāvyas are given below

| Epic | Composer | Dated | Number of cantos | Number of verses | Number of metres used | Word at each canto-end |
| Kumārasambhavam | Kālidāsa | 5th c. CE | 8 | 613 | 8 | — |
| Bhaṭṭikāvyam | Bhaṭṭi | 7th c. CE | 21 | 1602 | — | — |
| Raghuvaṃśam | Kālidāsa | 5th c. CE | 19 | 1572 | 21 | — |
| Kirātārjunīyam | Bhāravi | 6th c. CE | 18 | 1040 | 12 | Lakṣmī |
| Śiśupālavadham | Māgha | 7th/8th c. CE | 20 | 1645 | 16 | Śrī |
| Naiṣadhīyacaritam | Śrīharṣa | 12th c. CE | 22 | 2828 | 19 | Nisargojjvala |
| Śrībhārgavarāghavīyam | Rāmabhadrācārya | 21st c. CE | 21 | 2121 | 40 | Śrī |

== Reception ==
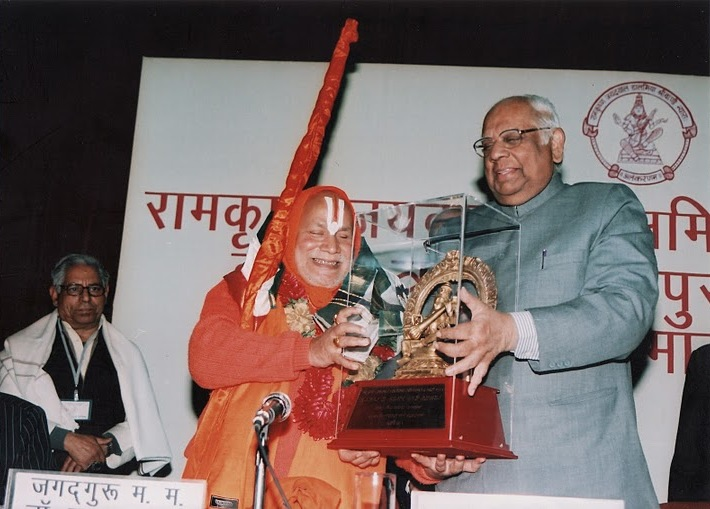
The poet being presented the Vani Alankarana Puraskara by Somnath Chatterjee for the epic

=== Critical response ===
Abhiraj Rajendra Mishra, former Vice-Chancellor of Sampurnanand Sanskrit University and winner of Sahitya Akademi Award in Sanskrit, writes in the introduction of the epic that in an age where the prevalence of Sanskrit is rare, several works in recent past have been published as epics which are devoid of the traditional features of a Sanskrit Mahākāvya, and have errors in grammar at many places. He thinks of Śrībhārgavarāghavīyam as an exception. He further says that this is an epic which nourishes the tradition of Ṛṣis, and with this composition the contemporary Sanskrit literature has been blessed.

Yogeshchandra Dubey, professor and head of department of Sanskrit at the Jagadguru Rambhadracharya Handicapped University, writes in the Publisher's Note at the beginning of the book that he views Śrībhārgavarāghavīyam as having even more special qualities and features than the epic works of Māgha, Bhāravi, Śrīharṣa and Kālidāsa. At the end of the Publisher's Note, he presents a metaphor-

In the Prayāga in the form of this epic, there is the Triveṇī Saṅgama of the Gaṅgā in the form of Laghutrayī and the Yamunā in the form of Bṛhattrayī, with the Sarasvatī in the form of the speech of Rāmbhadrācārya.

Dr. Vagish Dinkar, professor and head of department of Sanskrit at the R.S.S. PG College (Ghaziabad), and the author of the critique on the epic titled Śrībhārgavarāghavīyam Mīmāṃsā, writes at the conclusion of his critique that Śrībhārgavarāghavīyam is worthy of being considered with the Bṛhattrayī as the Catuṣṭayī (the quartet).

The epic Śrībhārgavarāghavīyam showcases the invigoration of the essence of the Vedas, and by composing it, Rāmbhadrācārya will achieve eternal fame like Kālidāsa and Tulasīdāsa. ... This best amongst the best epic is capable of endowing the previously composed Trayī works by the nomenclature of Catuṣṭayī.

Elsewhere, in award citations and in the media, the work has been described as time-conquering and outstanding.

=== Recognition and awards ===
The poet has been given several rewards for the composition of the epic since 2002. Some of them include –

- 2007. The Sixteenth Vachaspati Puraskar by the K. K. Birla Foundation for published Sanskrit works. The award was announced in 2008.
- 2006. Bāṇabhaṭṭa Award – Madhya Pradesh Sanskrit Board, Bhopal.
- 2005. Sahitya Akademi Award for Sanskrit.
- 2005. Śrī Vāṇī Alaṅkaraṇa Puraskāra by Ramkrishna Jaydayal Dalmiya Foundation. This was presented by the then Speaker of the Lok Sabha, Somnath Chatterjee in 2006.
