= Paul Dundas =

British Indologist (1952–2023)

Professor Paul Dundas
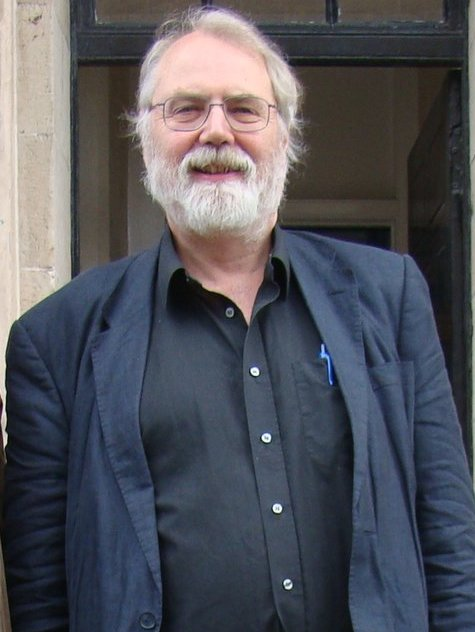
- Born: 23 May 1952
- Died: 5 April 2023 (aged 71)
- Education: University of Cambridge
- Occupation: Indologist
- Employer: University of Edinburgh
- Awards: Prakrit Jñānabhāratī International Awards (2019)

Paul Dundas (23 May 1952 – 5 April 2023) was a Scottish Indologist, an honorary fellow in Sanskrit language and Head of Asian studies at the University of Edinburgh. His teachings and research focused extensively on understanding Jainism, Buddhism, Sanskrit literature and Middle Indo-Aryan philology. He was regarded as one of the leading scholars in Jaina and Prakrit studies. He was a member of the Council of the Pali Text Society.

== Bibliography and research papers ==
=== Bibliography ===
Following is the partial list of his books:

- Dundas, P. (1992). The Jains. The Library of religious beliefs and practices. London: Routledge. ISBN 978-0-415-26606-2
- Dundas, P. (1998). The meat at the wedding feasts: Kr̥ṣṇa, vegetarianism and a Jain dispute. [Toronto]: Centre for South Asian Studies, University of Toronto. OCLC Number: 43745945
- Alphen, J. v., Pal, P., & Dundas, P. (2000). Steps to liberation: 2,500 years of Jain art and religion. Antwerpen: Etnografisch Museum. OCLC Number: 44834857
- Dundas, P. (2007). History, scripture and controversy in a medieval Jain sect. Routledge advances in Jaina studies. London: Routledge. ISBN 978-0-415-37611-2 OCLC Number: 68373250
- Dundas, P. (2017). Editing and translation of Magha's The Killing of Shishupala, Murty Classical Library of India, Harvard University Press. ISBN 978-0-674-66039-7

=== Research papers and conferences ===
- "Conversion to Jainism : Historical Perspectives" in R. Robinson and S. Clarke ( ed. ), Religious Conversion in India: Modes, Motivations, and Meanings, New Delhi: Oxford University Press 2003, pp. 125–48.
- "Haribhadra's Lalitavistara and the legend of Siddharsi's conversion to Jainism", in O. Qvarnstrom (ed. ), Jainism and Early Buddhism: Essays in Honor of Padmanabh S. Jaini, Fremont: Asian Humanities Press 2003, 151–66.
- "Beyond Anekantavada: A Jain Approach to Religious Tolerance", in T. Sethia ( ed. ), Ahimsa, Anekanta and Jainism, New Delhi: Motilal Banarsidass 2004, 123–36.
- Il Jainismo: L'antica religione indiana della non-violenza; Prefazione di Raffaele Torella, Roma: Castelvecchi 2005 (Italian translation of The Jains, second enlarged edition, London and New York Routledge 2002).
- "A Non-Imperial Religion? Jainism in its 'Dark Age'", in P. Olivelle (ed.), Between the Empires: Society in India 300BCE-400BCE, New York: Oxford University Press, 2006, pp. 383–414.
- "The Later Fortunes of Jamali", in P. Flugel (ed.), Studies in Jaina History and Culture: Disputes and dialogues, London and New York: Routledge 2006, pp. 33–60.

=== Later projects ===
- A translation with commentary of Yasovijaya's Dvatrimsaddvatrimsika.
- A study of the historical representation of the Jain Pancanamaskara mantra, with particular reference to Yasovijaya's Arhadgita.
- A systematic investigation of the Sanskrit and Prakrit texts of the "Haribhadra corpus".
