= Chitra-kavya =

Indian poetry tradition

Chitra-kavya (picture-poetry) is an ancient Indian tradition of writing poetry in visual patterns by play of meaning (shabdalankāra) (based in brilliant flexible play of vowels, consonants, words and sound). It is the device of constructing verses that can be written out in the form of a lotus or of a chariot. This tradition developed into different forms such as the Yamaka Kāvyas where the letters are the same while the meanings are different in different lines; in the Mahakavyas like the Kirātārjunīya and the Shishupala Vadha there are instances of verses with only a single letter of alphabet or only two letters, also there is the Niranunāsika, where no nasal sound appears, Rāmacarita narrates in the same set of verses the story of Rāma and of a king who patronised the poet. All these poems show the prodigious intellect of the poets and their control of the language effortlessly applied showing no obscurity in diction.

A Chitra-kāvya is created by composing a piece of verse specially designed to be fitted in a visual pattern or geometric arrangements; the reading of the verse is governed by the nature of the pattern used and can be read in different ways. This tradition is particularly suited to the Sanskrit Language in which because the meaning is syntax-independent, various kinds of visual arrangements of words are possible without loss or distortion of meaning.

Chitra-kāvyas provided inspiration to the writers and vaggeyakaras to model their works on similar lines. Jayadeva’s Gita Govinda is an excellent example of Chitra-kāvya. It influenced the development of the uparupaka forms in the succeeding period, and occupies a key position in the history of music and dance.

The term, Chitra (Sanskrit: चित्र) means – a picture, peculiar or variegated. In Sanskrit poetic parlance, Chitra-kāvya is the lowest category having no dhvani, deeper or suggested sense but charming only in its outer elements, diction or denotative sense or both. There are three varieties of Chitra-kāvya – a) Shabdachitra or verbal peculiarity, b) Arthachitra which consist of all figures of speech of sense, and c) Ubhayachitra exhibiting ingenuity both of words and sense.

The Chitra-kāvyas aim to generate a sense of wonder by resorting to unusual management of certain meters, innovative poetic structures, designs or patterns resembling objects or their movements that one commonly sees in life, so as to evoke poetic or emotive images where sounds of syllables and letters take a visible form.

Yudhisthiravijaya of Vasudeva, a Kerala poet, is one of the best Yamaka-kāvya in Sanskrit literature. Vasudeva was a Bhattāthiri of the pattattu family of Nambudiri Brahmins in the village of Perumanam. Sitāharana of Nārayana, one of the notable Yamaka-kāvya writers of Kerala, is written on the model of Yudhisthiravijaya of Vasudeva.

== See also ==
- Rāmakṛṣṇavilomakāvyaṃ
