= Mahakavya =

Indian genre of epic poetry

Mahākāvya (lit. great kāvya, court epic), also known as sargabandha, is a genre of Indian epic poetry in Classical Sanskrit. The genre is characterised by ornate and elaborate descriptions of phenomena such as scenery, love, and battles. Typical examples of mahākāvya are the Kumarasambhava and the Kiratarjuniya.

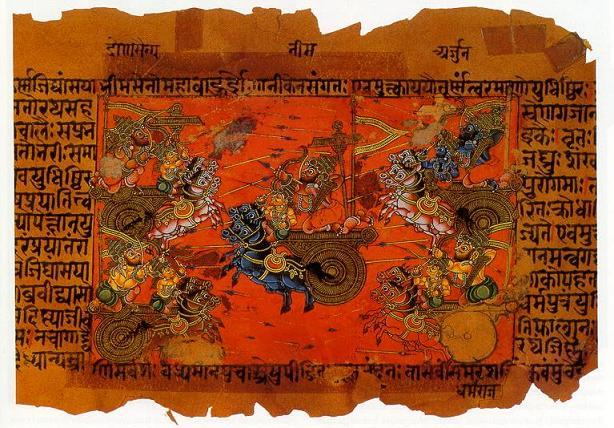
Mahabharata the longest Mahakavya

The genre evolved from earlier epics, the Mahabharata and the Ramayana. Despite the length of mahākāvyas (15-30 cantos, a total of about 1500-3000 verses), they are still much shorter than the Ramayana (500 cantos, 24000 verses) and the Mahabharata (about 100000 verses).

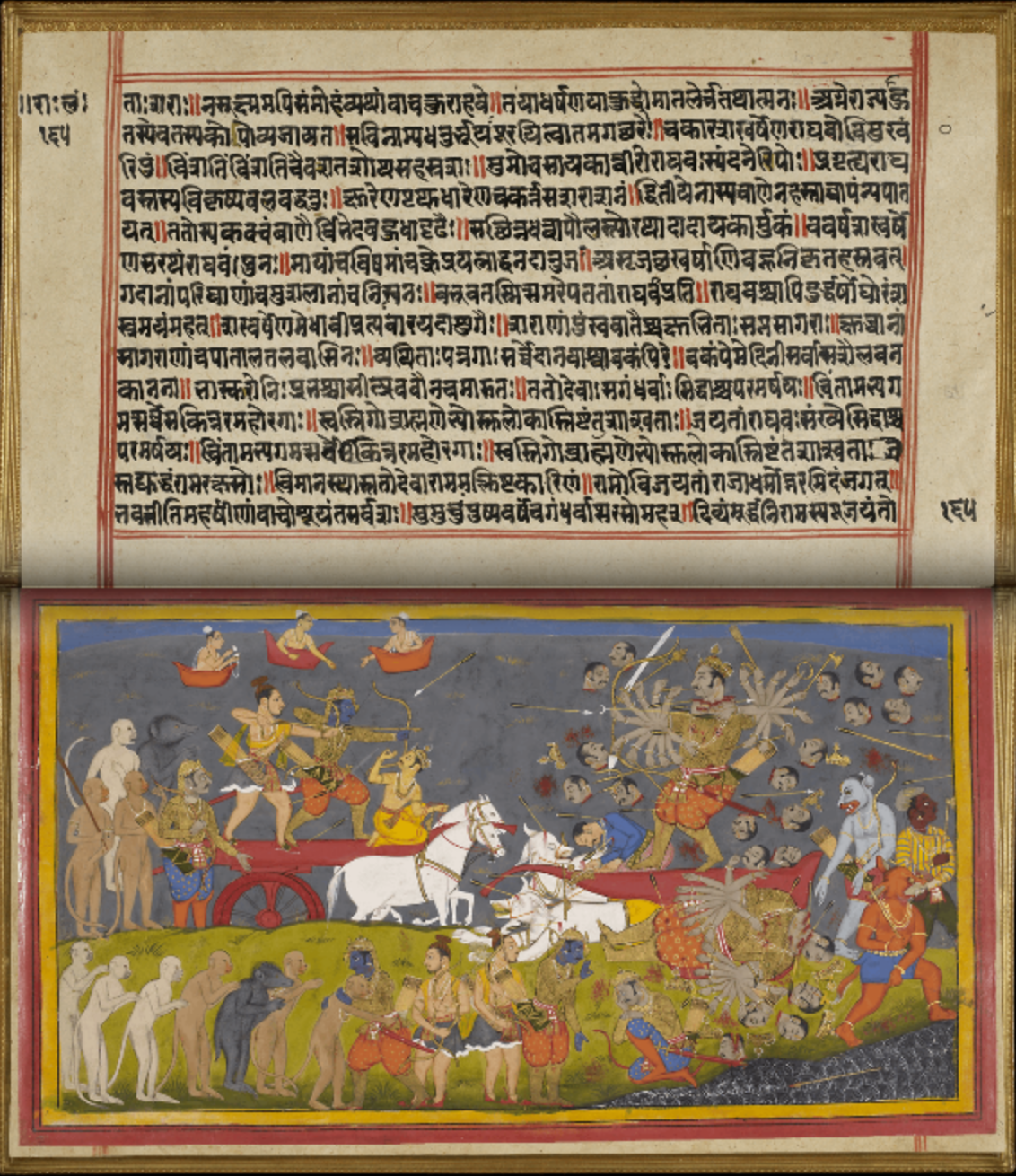
Ramayana

== Classical examples ==
The Buddhist poet and philosopher Aśvaghoṣa (c. 80 – c. 150 CE) is one of the earliest known classical Sanskrit poets whose works have survived. His Buddhacarita (Acts of the Buddha) is regarded as a mahākāvya and was later translated into both Tibetan and Chinese as part of the transmission of Buddhist texts. Another kāvya by Aśvaghoṣa is the Saundarananda, which focuses on the conversion of Nanda, Buddha's half-brother.

Tradition identifies five works as model mahākāvya:

- Kumārasambhava by Kālidāsa in 5th century CE: the wedding of Shiva and Parvati, and the birth of Kumara, in 17 cantos
- Raghuvaṃśa by Kālidāsa: the Raghu dynasty, in 19 cantos (about 1564 verses)
- Kiratarjuniya by Bharavi in 6th century CE: Arjuna's encounter with a Kirata (Shiva) 18 cantos
- Naiśadha-carita by Shriharsha in 1174 AD: on the life of King Nala and Queen Damayanti, 22 cantos
- Śiśupāla-vadha by Māgha in 7th century CE: the slaying of Shishupala by Krishna, 22 cantos (about 1800 verses)

To this list, sometimes a sixth one is also added.

- Bhaṭṭikāvya, by Bhaṭṭi in 7th century CE: describes the events of the Ramayana and simultaneously illustrates the principles of Sanskrit grammar, 22 cantos

== Characteristics ==
In the mahākāvya genre, more emphasis was laid on description than on narration. Daṇḍin's Kāvyādarśa lists the traditional characteristics of a mahākāvya as:

- It must take its subject matter from the epics (Ramayana or Mahabharata), or from history,
- It must help further the four goals of man (Purusharthas),
- It must contain descriptions of cities, seas, mountains, moonrise and sunrise, and "accounts of merrymaking in gardens, of bathing parties, drinking bouts, and love-making. It should tell the sorrow of separated lovers and should describe a wedding and the birth of a son. It should describe a king's council, an embassy, the marching forth of an army, a battle, and the victory of a hero".

About this list, Ingalls observes:

These are not random suggestions but specific requirements. Every complete mahākāvya that has come down to us from the time of Kalidasa contains the whole list, which, if one considers it carefully, will be seen to contain the basic repertory of Sanskrit poetry. Contained in it are the essential elements of nature, love, society, and war which a poet should be able to describe. The great kāvya tested a poet by his power of rendering content, which is a better test at least than the Persian diwan, which tested a poet by his skill at rhyme.

It is composed of a varying number of short poems or cantos, that tells the story of a classical epic. Each poem is composed in a metre that is fitting to the subject matter, such as a description of the seasons, a geographical form of nature such as a mountain, and cities.

== Modern mahakavya ==
In the relatively secluded world of modern Sanskrit literature, mahakavyas continue to be produced. Some of these have been awarded the Sahitya Akademi Award for Sanskrit. In the introduction to Ṣoḍaśī: An Anthology of Contemporary Sanskrit Poets (1992), Radhavallabh Tripathi writes:

On the other hand, the number of authors who appear to be very enthusiastic about writing in Sanskrit during these days is not negligible. […] In a thesis dealing with Sanskrit mahākāvyas written in a single decade, 1961–1970, the researcher [Dr. Ramji Upadhyaya] has noted 52 Sanskrit mahākāvyas (epic poems) produced in that very decade.

Some modern mahākāvyas do not aim to satisfy all the traditional criteria, and take as their subject historical matter (such as Rewa Prasad Dwivedi's Svatantrya Sambhavam on the Indian independence movement, or K.N. Ezhuthachan's Keralodayah on the history of Kerala), or biographies of historical characters (such as S.B. Varnekar's Shrishivarajyodayam on Shivaji, M. S. Aney's Sritilakayasornavah on Bal Gangadhar Tilak, or P. C. Devassia's Kristubhagavatam on Jesus Christ). Some others like the Śrībhārgavarāghaviyam (2002) composed by Jagadguru Rāmabhadrācārya continue to have the subject of the traditional epics.
