= Haihaya =

Hindu mythological king

- Texts: Mahabharata, Puranas

Genealogy
- Dynasty: Haihaya

Haihaya (Sanskrit: हैहय, romanized: Haihaya), also known as Vitahavya, was the founder of the eponymous Haihaya Kingdom and dynasty in Hinduism. According to the Puranas, he was the great grandson of Yadu, founder of the Yadu dynasty.

== Legend ==
According to the Mahabharata, Haihaya had ten wives, with whom he sired a hundred sons. These sons invaded the kingdom of Kashi, which was ruled by a king called Haryashva. They battled the king and slew him, after which they returned to their kingdom. They also defeated the king's successor, Sudeva, as well as Sudeva's successor, Divodasa. Divodasa fled to seek the help of Sage Bharadvaja. The sage performed a sacrifice, granting Divodasa a son who would be capable of vanquishing the Haihayas, called Pratardana. Thus blessed, Pratardana defeated and slew the sons of Haihaya. Haihaya fled his capital, seeking the protection of Sage Bhrigu. When Pratardana sought to slay Haihaya, Bhrigu announced that the king had attained Brahmana status, convincing him to spare him. Haihaya thus became a sage, becoming educated in the Vedas, and later siring a son named Gritsamada.
