= Haravijaya =

9th-century epic poem by Ratnākara

Haravijaya (Sanskrit: हरविजयम्, romanized: Haravijayam, lit. 'Śiva's Victory') is a Sanskrit mahākāvya written by Ratnākara. The poem narrates Śiva's victory over Andhaka. It also describes Śiva's iconographic features and gives an exposition of Śaiva philosophy. Haravijaya is the longest extant Sanskrit mahākāvya, containing a total of 4351 verses in fifty sargas (cantos).

== Authorship ==
In the praśasti of Haravijaya, Ratnākara, its author, speaks of himself as the son of Amṛtabhānu, a descendant of Durgadatta from Gangāhrada. According to Kalhaṇa's Rājataraṅgiṇī, he gained fame during the reign of Avantivarman (r. 855–883 CE), but the colophons of Haravijaya suggest it was composed during the reign of Cippaṭa Jayāpīḍa, between 826 and 838 CE. From the theme of his poem, it can be assumed that he was a practitioner of Kashmiri Śaivism; Alexis Sanderson states that the poem's hymns to Śiva and Pārvatī in canto 6 and 47 respectively are the earliest dateable evidence of the presence of Mantramārgic Śaivism in Kashmir. He also authored the Vakroktipañcāśikā, containing fifty verses of dialogue between Śiva and Pārvatī, employing the device of vakrokti ("punning conversation"); this is possibly his only other preserved work.

== Summary ==
Haravijaya is the longest extant Sanskrit mahākāvya, containing a total of 4351 verses in fifty sargas (cantos). The poem narrates Śiva's victory over Andhaka. In accordance with mahākāvya convention, the poem explores many aspects of life, including nature, seasons, love, and a battle. It also describes Śiva's iconographic features and gives an exposition of Śaiva philosophy in canto six. The poem belongs to a later phase of kāvya development, emphasising display of knowledge and command of poetical devices. The poet liberally uses concepts and technical terms from various śāstras on the fields described in the poem.

== Reception ==
Haravijaya has been praised in many Sanskrit anthologies and works on rhetorics and is also held in high esteem by modern Indian Sanskrit scholars. Rājaśekhara complemented Ratnākara with the following verse:

mā sma santi hi catvāraḥ prāyo ratnākarā ime
itīva sa kṛto dhātrā kavī ratnākaro ’paraḥ

Thinking the four oceans were not enough,
the creator
made another ocean,
the poet Ratnākara.

— Sūktimuktāvalī 4.77, translated by David Smith

Durgaprasad and Parab cite a contemporary opinion in their 1890 edition of the Haravijaya:

dugdhābdhīnāṃ sahasraṃ na kusumalasitaṃ sadvasantāyutaṃ vā
koṭir vā pārvaṇānāṃ suṣamaśāśabhṛtāṃ neṣadoṣātanānām
sampūrṇaṃ vā sudhābhiḥ puraṭaghaṭaśataṃ hanta dhvanvantareno
pāṇiṣṭhaṃ cāru ratnākarasukavigirāṃ merulakṣaṃ na mūlyam

Not a thousand milk oceans,
nor ten thousand springtimes
shining with flowers,
nor ten million splendid moons of autumn,
not a hundred lovely golden pots full of nectar
in Dhanvantari’s hand,
no, not a hundred thousand Merus,
are worth the poem of the excellent poet Ratnākara.

— Sadāśivaśaṅkaraśāstrin, translated by David Smith

== Commentaries ==
Peter Pasedach lists three commentaries on the poem: Viṣamapadoddyotā by Alaka, Laghupañcikā by Ratnakaṇṭha, and Haravijayasāravivaraṇa by Utpala.

== Editions ==
An edition of the work was published in 1890, prepared by Pandit Durgaprasad and Kasinath Pandurang Parab for the Kāvyamālā series. It contains Alaka's commentary up to canto 46. Another edition of the text, from 1982, was prepared by Dr. Goparaju Rama for the Ganganatha Jha Kendriya Sanskrit Vidyapitha Text Series and published in two volumes. It is a critical edition based on six manuscripts without any serious variation, and only contains Ratnākara's verses, without any commentary.

- Pandit Durgaprasad; Kasinath Pandurang Parab, eds. (1982) [1st pub. 1890 from Nirnaya Sagar Press]. The Haravijaya of Rājānaka Ratnākara with the Commentary of Rājānaka Alaka. Chaukhamba Sanskrit Sansthan.
- Goparaju Rama, ed. (1982). Haravijayam by Rājānaka Ratnākara. Rashtriya Sanskrit Sansthan.
