= Nasikya kingdom =

Nasikya was a kingdom mentioned in the epic Mahabharata. During the time of Ramayana this place was a forest and was known as Panchavati. It was here that Raghava Rama, Lakshmana and Sita spent their period of exile from their kingdom Kosala into the woods.

== See also ==
- Kingdoms of Ancient India
