= Bharavi =

Indian poet

Bharavi (Bhāravi) was a 6th century Indian poet known for his epic poem Kirātārjunīya, one of the six mahakavyas in classical Sanskrit.

== Date ==
According to multiple grant inscriptions of the Ganga dynasty, such as the Gummareddipura inscription, the Ganga King Durvinita wrote a Kannada-language commentary on the canto 15 of Bharavi's Kirātārjunīya. The date of the Gummareddipura inscription is debated among scholars, but the end of Durvinita's reign is dated to c. 580 CE, which means that Bharavi lived around or before this time.

The Avanti-sundara-katha of Dandin (7th-8th century) suggests that Bharavi was a contemporary of the Kings Simha-vishnu, Vishnu-vardhana, and Durvinita; he was also a contemporary of Dandin's fourth-generation ancestor Damodara (see Biography below). Based on this account, Sanskrit scholar G. Harihara Sastri theorizes that Prince Kubja Vishnuvardhana of the Chalukya family was a patron of Bharavi before he became the Eastern Chalukya king around c. 615 CE. Sastri thus places Bharavi around the beginning of the 7th century. According to Indologist A. K. Warder, the Vishnu-vardhana of Dandin's account is more likely to be the 6th-century Aulikara ruler Yashodharman Vishnu-vardhana, which places Bharavi's floruit in c. 530–550 CE. Sanskrit professor M. K. Gangopadhyaya similarly places Bharavi around 500-550 CE. According to historian B. Muddachari, Bharavi lived "on either side of the beginning of the 6th century". Arthur Berriedale Keith states that it is 'wiser to place him c. A.D. 550 than as early as A.D. 500" on the basis that Bharavi could not have flourished too long before Bāṇa, who was active in the 7th century.

The Aihole inscription (634 CE) of the Chalukya king Pulakeshin II (a brother of Kubja Vishnuvardhana) states that its composer Ravikirti "attained the fame of Kalidasa and Bharavi". Thus, by 634 CE, Bharavi was acknowledged as a great poet comparable to the famous Kalidasa.

== Place ==
The majority of scholars theorize that Bharavi was from the southern region of India. The inscriptions that mention him are from western Deccan region. R. R. Bhagawat Sastri, who first suggested that Bharavi from southern India, argues that his description of the Sahya mountains (the Western Ghats) in southern India is vivid and more realistic than his rather fanciful description of the Himalayas in northern India. Mahamahopadhyay Durgaprasada dismisses this argument, pointing out that Ratnakara—a Kashmiri poet from northern India—has described several rivers and mountains of southern India. Gangopadhyaya similarly argues that Bharavi may have simply visited the Sahya mountains at some point in his life. Critics of this theory also point out that Bharavi mentions the Sahya mountains only once, but he has devoted around 52 verses to the Himalayas.

== Biography ==
As with most ancient Sanskrit poets, very few concrete details are available about Bharavi's life. He does not provide any personal information in his only extant work, the Kiratarjuniya. Much of the information about his life comes from legends and stories that are of doubtful historicity.

=== Mention in the Avanti-sundara-katha-sara ===
A historically plausible account of Bharavi is found in Avanti-sundari-katha and its metrical summary, the Avanti-sundari-katha-sara, both of which are attributed to the 7th-century poet Dandin. According to a manuscript of Avanti-sundari-katha from the Madras Oriental Manuscripts Library, a Gandharva visitor to the court of the Pallava king Simha-vishnu narrates a Sanskrit verse to the king. The king is impressed and asks about the composer of the verse, and the visitor provides the following information: the poet Damodara was the son of Narayana-svami, a Brahmin of Kaushika gotra. His ancestors had migrated from Anandapura in the north-west to Achalapura in Nasikya. The poet was a vegetarian, and considered meat-eating a sin, but had to eat meat during a hunting expedition of his friend prince Vishnu-vardhana. To expiate this sin, he set on a pilgrimage, during which he entered the court of the Ganga king Durvinita. On hearing this account, King Simha-vishnu invited the poet to his court. The poet, who was around 20 years old at the time, responded after several invitations. The king treated him like a son, and he lived in the company of Prince Mahendra-vikrama. The poet had three sons, and his second son Manoratha had four sons. Manoratha's youngest son Viradatta was the father of Dandin.

The original prose of the Avanti-sundari-katha is only available in fragments, and various scholars have filled the lacunas in its manuscript using their own judgment. Sanskrit scholar M. Ramakrishna Kavi theorized that Damodara was an alias of Bharavi, based on a verse in the metrical version Avanti-sundari-katha-sara. This claim has been repeated by later writers as well.

G. Harihara Sastri dismisses the identification of Bharavi with Damodara, stating that Kavi's interpretation is based on a misreading of the verse, and that the metrical version was apparently written by a later writer. Based on an analysis of palm-leaf manuscript of the Avanti-sundari-katha, Sastri concludes that Dandin's text states that "Damodara, associating himself with Bharavi, the great Śaivite and the fountain of the Muse, allied himself by ties of friendship with the prince Viṣṇuvardhana". Dandin states that Damodara wrote the Gandha-madana and a treatise on poetics (in Sanskrit and Prakrit) under the patronage of King Simha-vishnu. However, Bharavi is known to have composed only Kiratarjuniya, which further suggests that Damodara and Bharavi were two different persons.

Thus, all that can be inferred from Dandin's text is that Bharavi was a Shaivite, a great poet, and a courtier of Vishnu-vardhana; and that he introduced another poet named Damodara to Vishnu-vardhana.

=== Other accounts ===
According to one legend, Bharavi was a poor poet. After his wife rebuked him for not making money, he decided to seek royal patronage. During his journey to the royal capital, he stopped by a lake and wrote a verse encouraging the reader to not perform any act rashly. The king, who had come there during a hunting excursion, read the verse and impressed, invited Bharavi to the royal palace. However, when Bharavi arrived at the palace, a royal employee turned him away, disgusted by his poor appearance. Meanwhile, the king had inscribed the verse in gold in his bedroom. One day, he found his queen laying in the bed with a young man. He became enraged and was about to kill the two, when he saw the verse inscribed on the wall, and stopped. The queen then introduced the young man as their long lost son. The king was happy to find an heir to the throne; he found the poet and rewarded him lavishly.

Yet another legend describes Bharavi as a contemporary of Kalidasa and Dandin, stating that all three poets enjoyed the patronage of king Vikrama in Kanchi.

Gangopadhyaya describes both these legends as "absurd and useless".

== Work ==
Bharavi's only known work is Kirātārjunīya, an eighteen canto epic poem, the story for which comes from the Mahābhārata. Kirātārjunīya "is regarded to be the most powerful poem in the Sanskrit language". A. K. Warder considers it the "most perfect epic available to us", over Aśvaghoṣa's Buddhacharita, noting his greater force of expression, with more concentration and polish in every detail. Despite using extremely difficult language and rejoicing in the finer points of Sanskrit grammar, he achieves conciseness and directness. His alliteration, "crisp texture of sound", and choice of metre closely correspond to the narrative.

His poetry is characterised by its intricate styles and ethereal expressions. Like Kalidasa for his similes (upamā) and Daṇḍin for his wordplay (padalālityam), Bharavi is known for his "weight of meaning" (arthagauravam).

It is thought that Bharavi's Kiratarjuniya influenced the 8th century CE poet Magha's Shishupala Vadha.
