= Kirātārjunīya =

Hindu epic poem by Bhāravi

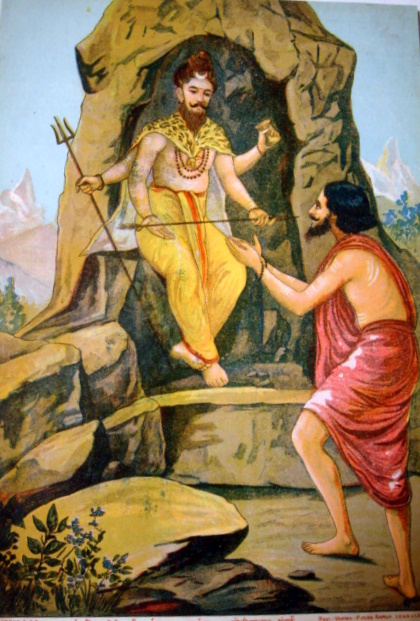
- Arjuna receives the Pashupatastra from Shiva. Painting by Raja Ravi Varma, 19th century.

Information
- Religion: Hinduism
- Author: Bhāravi
- Language: Sanskrit
- Period: Kadamba-Pallava

Kirātārjunīya (Sanskrit: किरातार्जुनीय, Of Kirata and Arjuna) is an epic poem by Bhāravi, written in Sanskrit. Believed to have been composed in the 6th century or earlier, it consists of eighteen cantos describing the combat between Shiva (in the guise of a kirata, or "mountain-dwelling hunter"), and Arjuna. Along with the Naiṣadhacarita and the Shishupala Vadha, it is one of the larger three of the six Sanskrit mahakavyas, or great epics. It is noted among Sanskrit critics both for its gravity or depth of meaning, and for its forceful and sometimes playful expression. This includes a canto set aside for demonstrating linguistic feats, similar to constrained writing. Later works of epic poetry followed the model of the Kirātārjunīya.

== Synopsis ==
=== Overview ===
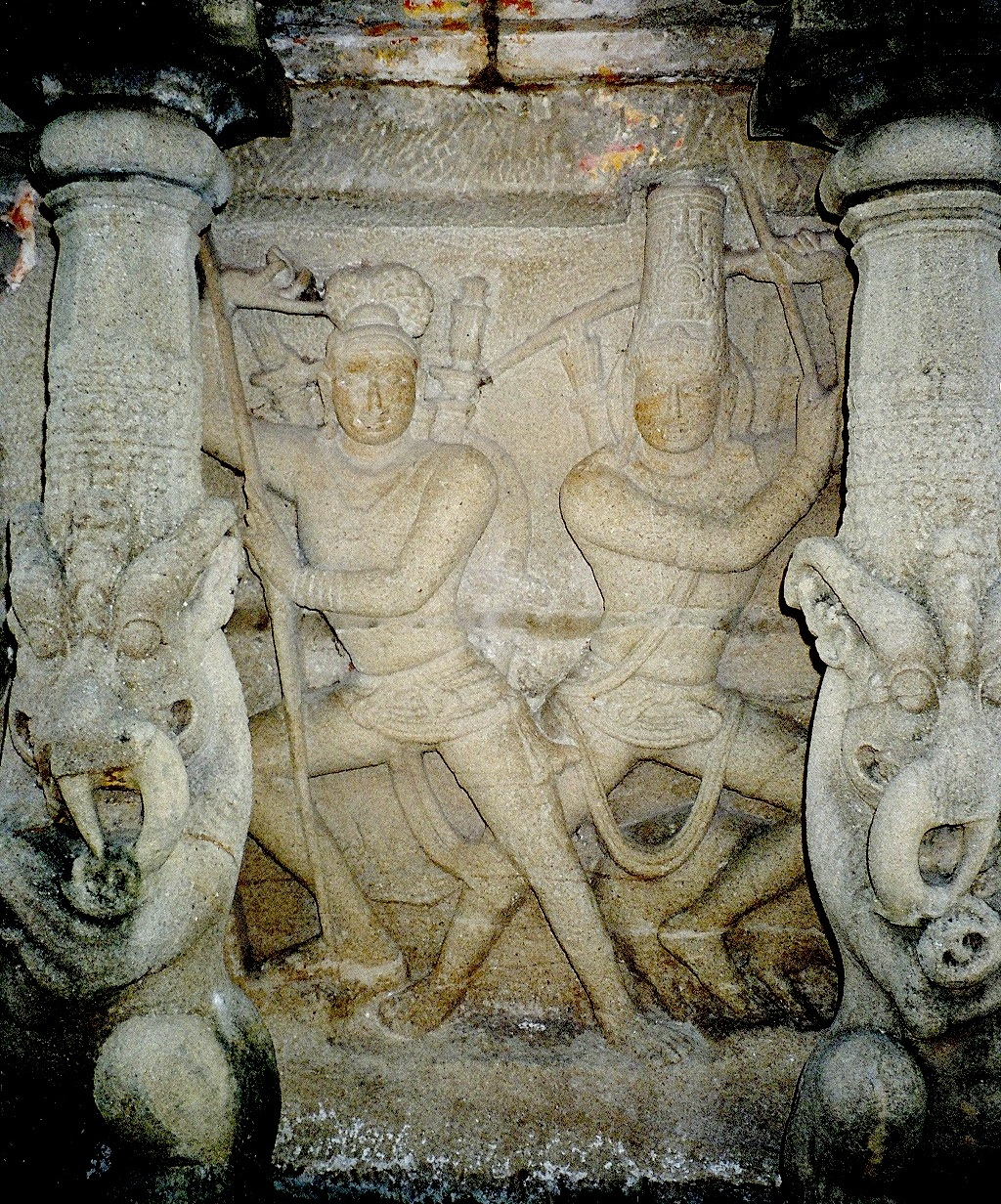
Arjuna fights with the Kirata-Shiva

The Kirātārjunīya predominantly features the Vīra rasa, or the mood of valour. It expands upon a minor episode in the Vana Parva ("Book of the Forest") the third book of the Mahabharata: While the Pandavas are exiled in the forest, Draupadi and Bhima incite Yudhishthira to declare war on the Kauravas, but he does not relent. Finally, Arjuna, at the instruction of Indra, appeases Shiva with penance (tapasya) in the forest. Pleased by his austerities, Shiva decides to reward him.

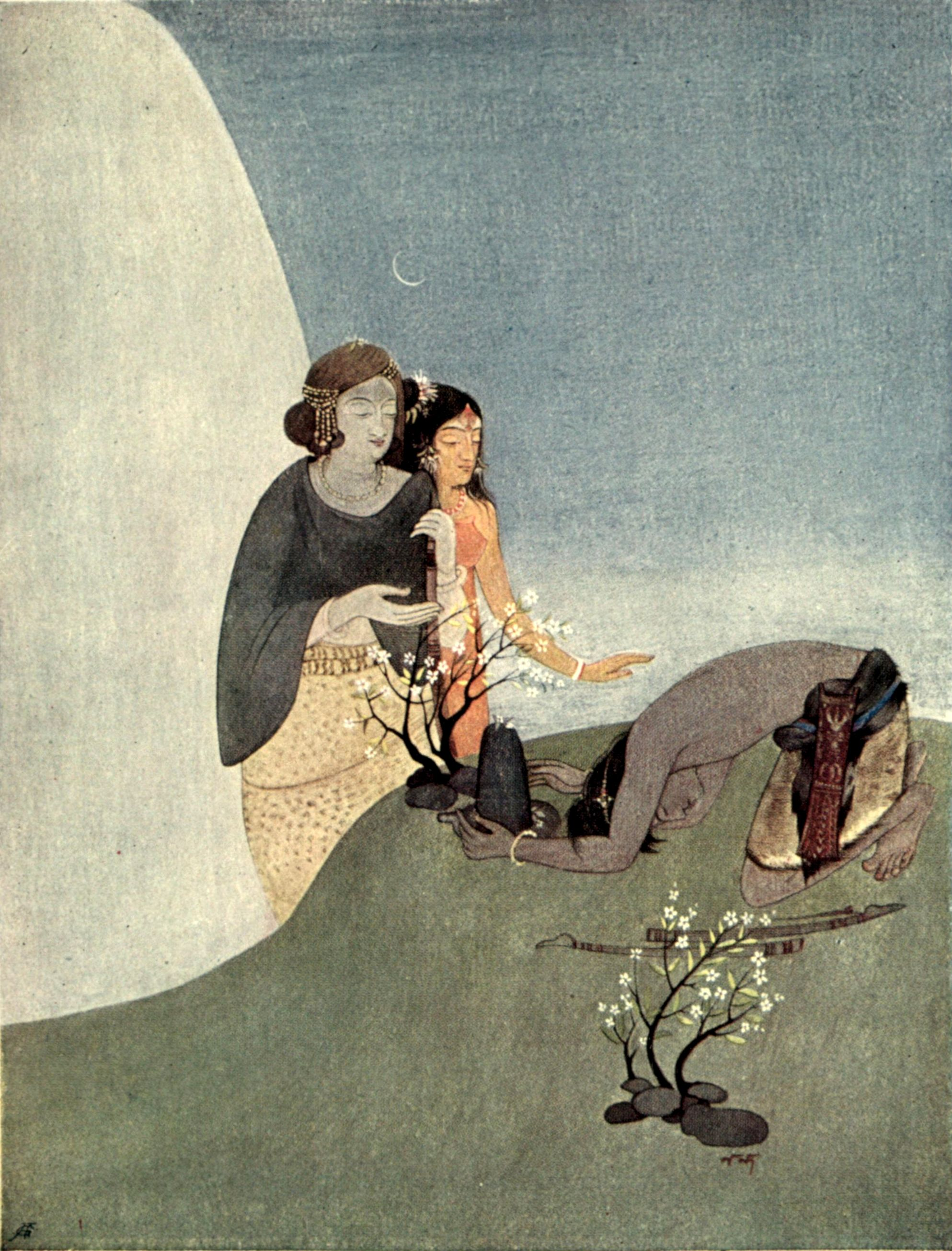
Kirata-Arjuna, by Nandalal Bose, 1914

When a demon named Muka, in the form of a wild boar, charges toward Arjuna, Shiva appears in the form of a kirata, a wild mountaineer. Arjuna and the kirata simultaneously shoot an arrow at the boar, and kill it. They argue over who shot first, and a battle ensues. They fight for a long time, and Arjuna is shocked that he cannot conquer this kirata. Finally, he recognises the god, and surrenders to him. Shiva, pleased with his bravery, gives him the powerful weapon, the Pashupatastra. Apart from Arjuna, no one possessed the Pashupatastra in the Mahabharata.

=== The Cantos ===
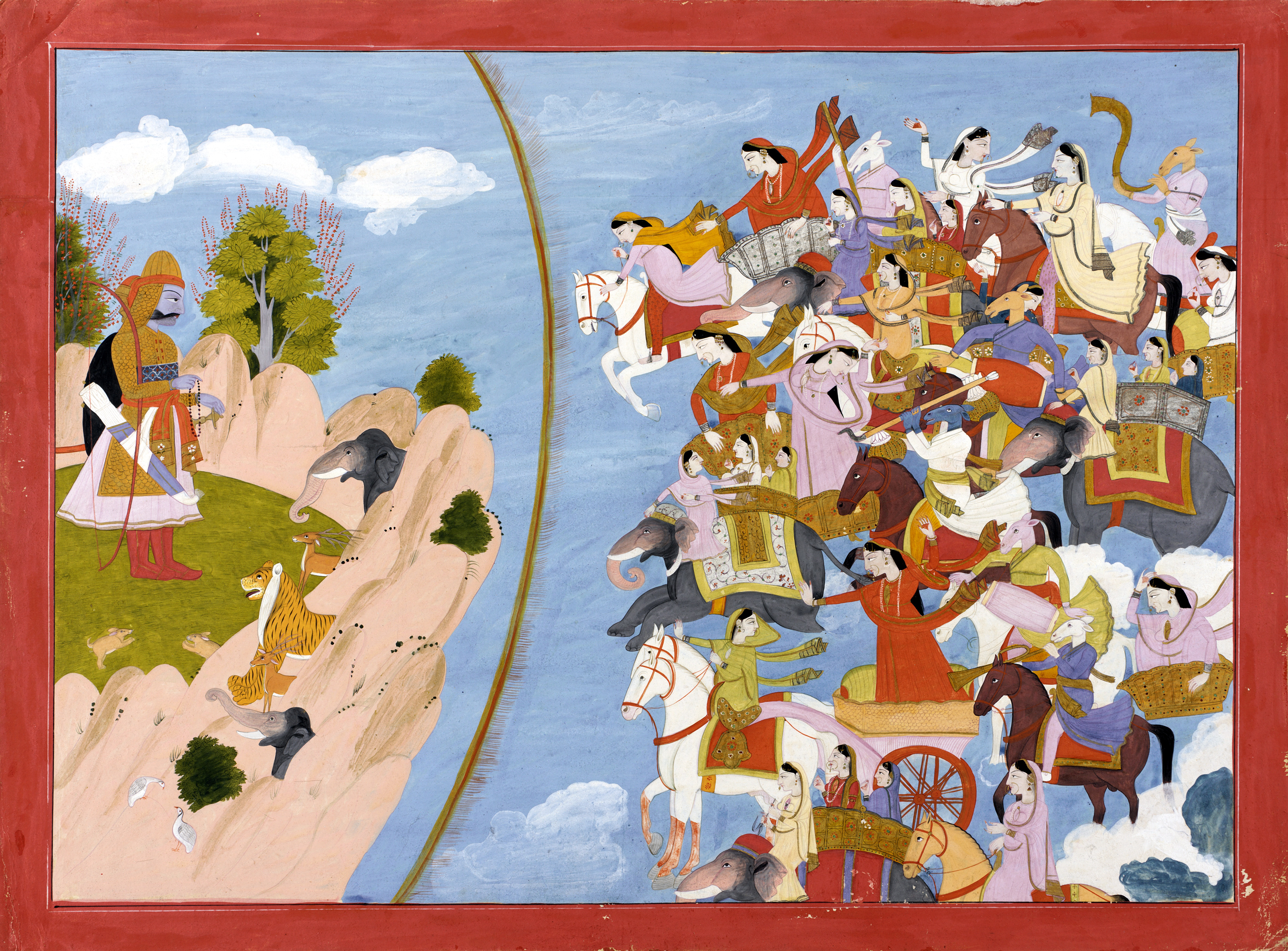
Arjuna, with the army of celestial maidens (apsaras) and musicians (Gandharvas) approaching. Kangra watercolour, Himachal Pradesh, c. 1820.

There are 18 cantos in this epic poem. The following canto-by-canto description of the work is from A. K. Warder. Bharavi's work begins with the word śrī (fortune), and the last verse of every canto contains the synonym Lakshmi.

I. A spy of the exiled king Yudhishthira arrives and informs him of the activities of the Kauravas. Yudhiṣṭhira informs the other Pandavas, and his wife Draupadi attempts to incite him to declare war, upbraiding him for passively accepting the exile rather than breaking the agreement and declaring war to regain what is rightfully theirs.
II. Bhima supports Draupadi, pointing out that it would be shameful to receive their kingdom back as a gift instead of winning it in war, but Yudhiṣṭhira refuses, with a longer speech. Meanwhile, the sage Vyasa arrives.
III. Vyasa points out that the enemy is stronger, and they must use their time taking actions that would help them win a war, if one were to occur at the end of their exile. He instructs Arjuna to practise ascetism (tapasya) and propitiate Indra to acquire divine weapons for the eventual war. Arjuna departs, after being reminded by Draupadi of the humiliation she has suffered.
V. Arjuna is led by a yaksha to the Indrakila mountain, which is described in great detail. Arjuna begins his intense austerities, the severity of which causes disturbance among the gods.
VI. Meanwhile, a celestial army of nymphs (apsarass) sets out from heaven, in order to eventually distract Arjuna.
VII. Description of their passage through the heavens.
VIII. The nymphs enjoy themselves on the mountain.
IX. Description of the night, with celebrations of drinking and sex.
X. The nymphs attempt to distract Arjuna, accompanied by musicians (gandharvas) and making the best features of all six seasons appear simultaneously. However, they fail, as instead of Arjuna falling in love with them, they fall in love with Arjuna instead.
XI. Finally, Indra arrives as a sage, praises Arjuna's asceticism, but criticises him for seeking victory and wealth instead of liberation — the goddess of Fortune is fickle and indiscriminate. Arjuna stands his ground, explaining his situation and pointing out that conciliation with evil people would lead one into doing wrong actions oneself. He gives a further long speech that forms the heart of the epic, on right conduct, self-respect, resoluteness, dignity, and wisdom. Pleased, Indra reveals himself to his son, and asks him to worship Shiva.
XII. Arjuna begins severe austerities, and, on being implored by the other ascetics, Shiva takes the form of a kirata and arrives to meet Arjuna.
XIII. Both Arjuna and the kirata shoot the boar. Arjuna goes to retrieve his arrow, and one of the kiratas quarrels with him.
XIV-XVIII. Arjuna and Shiva fight. Arjuna fails and finally realizes whom he is facing, and surrenders to Shiva and wins his benediction.

== Appraisal ==
The work was popular among critics, with more than 42 commentaries written on it. The style of his work, with cantos 4 to 9 having no relation to the plot but instead serving as a framework for beautiful descriptive poetry, was influential on all later Sanskrit epic poetry, in which the action was often ignored entirely. Over a tenth of the verses from this work are quoted in various anthologies and works on poetics. The most popular verse is the 37th from the eighth canto, which describes nymphs bathing in a river, and is noted for its beauty. Another verse from the fifth canto (utphulla sthalanalini...) is noted for its imagery, and has given Bharavi the sobriquet of "Chhatra Bharavi", as he describes the pollen of the lotus flowers being blown by the wind into a golden umbrella (Chhatra) in the sky. Thus, for having verses that are pleasing to laypeople as well as clever verses appreciated by scholars, the work is considered to have 'harmony' or 'appropriateness' at all levels, and has been said to possess samastalokarañjakatva, the quality of delighting all the people.

The Kirātārjunīya is the only known work of Bharavi and "is regarded to be the most powerful poem in the Sanskrit language". A. K. Warder considers it the "most perfect epic available to us", over Aśvaghoṣa's Buddhacarita, noting its greater force of expression, with more concentration and polish in every detail. Despite using extremely difficult language and rejoicing in the finer points of Sanskrit grammar, Bharavi achieves conciseness and directness. His alliteration, "crisp texture of sound", and choice of metre closely correspond to the narrative.

== Linguistic ingenuity ==
The work is known for its brevity, depth (arthagauravam), and verbal complexity. At times, the narrative is secondary to the interlaced descriptions, elaborate metaphors and similes, and display of mastery in the Sanskrit language. Notably, its 15th canto contains chitrakavya, decorative composition, including the 14th verse with "elaborate rhythmic consonance" noted for consisting of just one consonant:

Devanagari
न नोननुन्नो नुन्नोनो नाना नानानना ननु ।
नुन्नोऽनुन्नो ननुन्नेनो नानेना नुन्ननुन्ननुत् ॥

IAST
na nonanunno nunnono nānā nānānanā nanu ।
nunno'nunno nanunneno nānenā nunnanunnanut ॥

Translation: "О ye many-faced ones (nānānanā), he indeed (nanu) is not a man (na nā) who is defeated by an inferior (ūna-nunno), and that man is no man (nā-anā) who persecutes one weaker than himself (nunnono). He whose leader is not defeated (na-nunneno) though overcome is not vanquished (nunno'nunno); he who persecutes the completely vanquished (nunna-nunna-nut) is not without sin (nānenā)."

The 25th verse from the same canto is an example of the form of verse that the Sanskrit aestheticians call sarvatobhadra, "good from every direction": each line (pada) of it is a palindrome, and the verse is unchanged when read vertically down or up as well:

देवाकानिनि कावादे
वाहिकास्वस्वकाहि वा ।
काकारेभभरे का का
निस्वभव्यव्यभस्वनि ॥

devākānini kāvāde
vāhikāsvasvakāhi vā ।
kākārebhabhare kā kā
nisvabhavyavyabhasvani ॥

de	vā	kā	ni	ni	kā	vā	de
vā	hi	kā	sva	sva	kā	hi	vā
kā	kā	re	bha	bha	re	kā	kā
ni	sva	bha	vya	vya	bha	sva	ni
(and the lines reversed)
ni	sva	bha	vya	vya	bha	sva	ni
kā	kā	re	bha	bha	re	kā	kā
vā	hi	kā	sva	sva	kā	hi	vā
de	vā	kā	ni	ni	kā	vā	de

Translation: "O man who desires war! This is that battlefield which excites even the gods, where the battle is not of words. Here people fight and stake their lives not for themselves but for others. This field is full of herds of maddened elephants. Here those who are eager for battle and even those who are not very eager, have to fight."

Similarly, the 23rd verse of the fifteenth canto is the same as the 22nd verse read backwards, syllable by syllable.

The 52nd verse of the 15th canto is an example of Mahāyamaka, or the great Yamaka, where all four feet of the verse are the same, but each foot has a different meaning.

Devanagari
विकाशमीयुर्जगतीशमार्गणा विकाशमीयुर्जगतीशमार्गणाः ।
विकाशमीयुर्जगतीशमार्गणा विकाशमीयुर्जगतीशमार्गणाः ॥

IAST
vikāśamīyurjagatīśamārgaṇā vikāśamīyurjagatīśamārgaṇāḥ |
vikāśamīyurjagatīśamārgaṇā vikāśamīyurjagatīśamārgaṇāḥ ॥

Translation: "The arrows (mārgaṇāḥ), of the king (jagatīśa) Arjuna spread out (vikāśam īyuḥ). The arrows (mārgaṇāḥ), of the lord of the earth (jagatīśa) [i.e. Śiva], spread out (vikāśam īyuḥ). The Gaṇas (gaṇāḥ) who are the slayers of demons (jagatīśamār) rejoiced (vikāśam īyuḥ). The seekers (mārgaṇāḥ) of Śiva (jagatīśa) [i.e. the deities and sages], reached (īyuḥ) the sky (vikāśam) [to watch the battle]. "

== Offshoots and commentaries ==
The earliest commentary of Kiratarjuniya was likely on Canto 15, by the Western Ganga King Durvinita in Kannada; however, this work is not extant.

Bharavi's "power of description and dignity of style" were an inspiration for Māgha's Shishupala Vadha, which is modelled after the Kirātārjunīya and seeks to surpass it. While Bharavi uses 19 different types of metres, Māgha uses 23; while Bharavi praises Shiva, Māgha extols Vishnu; and he has his own instances of one-consonant (dādadoduddaduddādī…) and sarvatobhadra palindromic verses.

A vyayoga (a kind of play), also named Kirātārjunīya and based on Bharavi's work, was produced by the Sanskrit dramatist Vatsaraja in the 12th or 13th century.

The authoritative commentary on the Kirātārjunīya, as on the other five mahakayvas, is by Mallinātha (c. 1500 CE). His commentary on the Kirātārjunīya is known as the Ghaṇṭāpatha (the Bell-Road) and explains the multiple layers of compounds and figures of speech present in the verses.

The first Western translation of the poem was by Carl Cappeller into German, published by the Harvard Oriental Series in 1912. There have since been six or more partial translations into English.

== See also ==
- Arjunawiwaha
