= Magha (poet) =

7th century Sanskrit poet

Mahakavi Magha
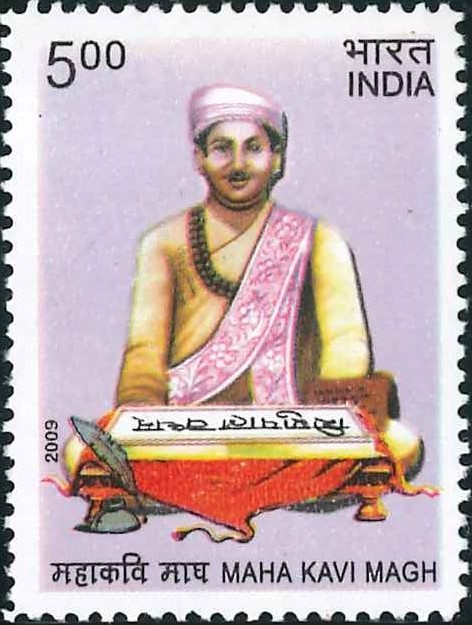
- Poet Magha
- Born: c. 7th century Shrimal (present-day Bhinmal)
- Occupation: Poet

Magha (c. 7th century) (Sanskrit: माघ, Māgha) was a Sanskrit poet at King Varmalata's court at Shrimala, the then-capital of Gujarat (presently in Rajasthan state). Magha was born in a Shrimali Brahmin family. He was the son of Dattaka Sarvacharya and the grandson of Suprabhadeva. His epic poem (mahākāvya) Shishupala Vadha, in 20 sargas (cantos), is based on the Mahabharata episode in which Krishna uses his chakra (disc) to behead the defiant king Shishupala. He is thought to have been inspired by, and is often compared with, Bharavi.

== Life and work ==
Māgha's fame rests entirely on the Shishupala Vadha. Vallabhadeva and Kshemendra quote some verses that are not found in the Shishupala Vadha as that of Māgha, so it is believed that Māgha wrote some other works that are now lost.

Unlike most Indian poets who give no autobiographical details or allude to any contemporary events, Māgha gives some autobiographical details in the concluding five verses of the work (known as the Praśasti). The verses inform that his father was Dattaka and his grandfather was Suprabhadeva, a minister at the court of a king whose name is mentioned in different editions as Varmalāta, Dharmanābha, Dharmanātha, Varmalākhya, etc. These verses are therefore called the nija-vaṃśa-varṇana or kavi-vaṃśa-varṇana by commentators.

According to tradition, Māgha was a native of Gujarat, born in Shrimal Nagar, present day Bhinmal, in district Jalore, Rajasthan.

By his own accounts and that of others, he was born wealthy and lived a carefree life, although according to one legend, he died in poverty.

== Date ==
Māgha is quoted by Anandavardhana, Bhoja, and in the Kavirajamarga, thus putting him no later than the 8th century. Pathak notes that he alludes to the Kāśikāvṛtti and its commentary Nyāsa, the latter of which is not mentioned by I-Tsing and thus must have been written after his departure from India in 695 CE. Thus, Pathak puts Māgha in the second half of the 8th century. Hermann Jacobi puts him in the 6th century. Lorenz Franz Kielhorn and others put him in the second half of the 7th century based on a written record from the present-day Rajasthan region. This record estimates King Varmalāta, whom Magha's grandfather served, as reigning the region in 625 A.D.

== Appraisal ==
Māgha is highly popular with Sanskrit critics and is extensively quoted by them. His Shishupala Vadha seems to have been inspired by the Kirātārjunīya of Bharavi, and intended to emulate and even surpass it. Like Bharavi, he displays rhetorical and metrical skill more than the growth of the plot, and is noted for his intricate wordplay, textual complexity, and verbal ingenuity. He also uses a rich vocabulary, so much so that the claim has been made that his work contains every word in the Sanskrit language. Whereas Bhāravi glorifies Shiva, Māgha glorifies Krishna; while Bhāravi uses 19 metres Māgha uses 23, like Bhāravi's 15th canto full of contrived verses Māgha introduces even more complicated verses in his 19th.

A popular Sanskrit verse about Māgha (and hence about this poem, as it his only known work and the one his reputation rests on) says:

उपमा कालिदासस्य भारवेरर्थगौरवं|
दण्डिनः पदलालित्यं माघे सन्ति त्रयो गुणः||
upamā kālidāsasya, bhāraver arthagauravaṃ,
daṇḍinaḥ padalālityaṃ — māghe santi trayo guṇaḥ
"The similes of Kalidasa, Bharavi's depth of meaning, Daṇḍin's wordplay — in Māgha all three qualities are found."

Thus, Māgha's attempt to surpass Bharavi appears to have been successful; even his name seems to be derived from this feat: another Sanskrit saying goes tāvat bhā bhāraveḥ bhāti yāvat māghasya nodayaḥ, which can mean "the lustre of the sun lasts until the advent of Maagha (the coldest month)", but also "the lustre of Bharavi lasts until the advent of Māgha". However, Māgha follows Bhāravi's structure too closely, and the long-windedness of his descriptions loses the gravity and "weight of meaning" found in Bhāravi's poem. Consequently, Māgha is more admired as a poet than the work is as a whole, and the sections of the work that may be considered digressions from the story have the nature of an anthology and are more popular.

Māgha influenced Ratnākara's Haravijaya, an epic in 50 cantos that suggests a thorough study of the Shishupalavadha. The Dharmashramabhyudaya, a Sanskrit poem by Hari[s]chandra in 21 cantos on Dharmanatha, the 15th tirthankara, is modeled on the Shishupalavadha.
