= Sanskrit Buddhist literature =

Buddhist texts composed in Sanskrit

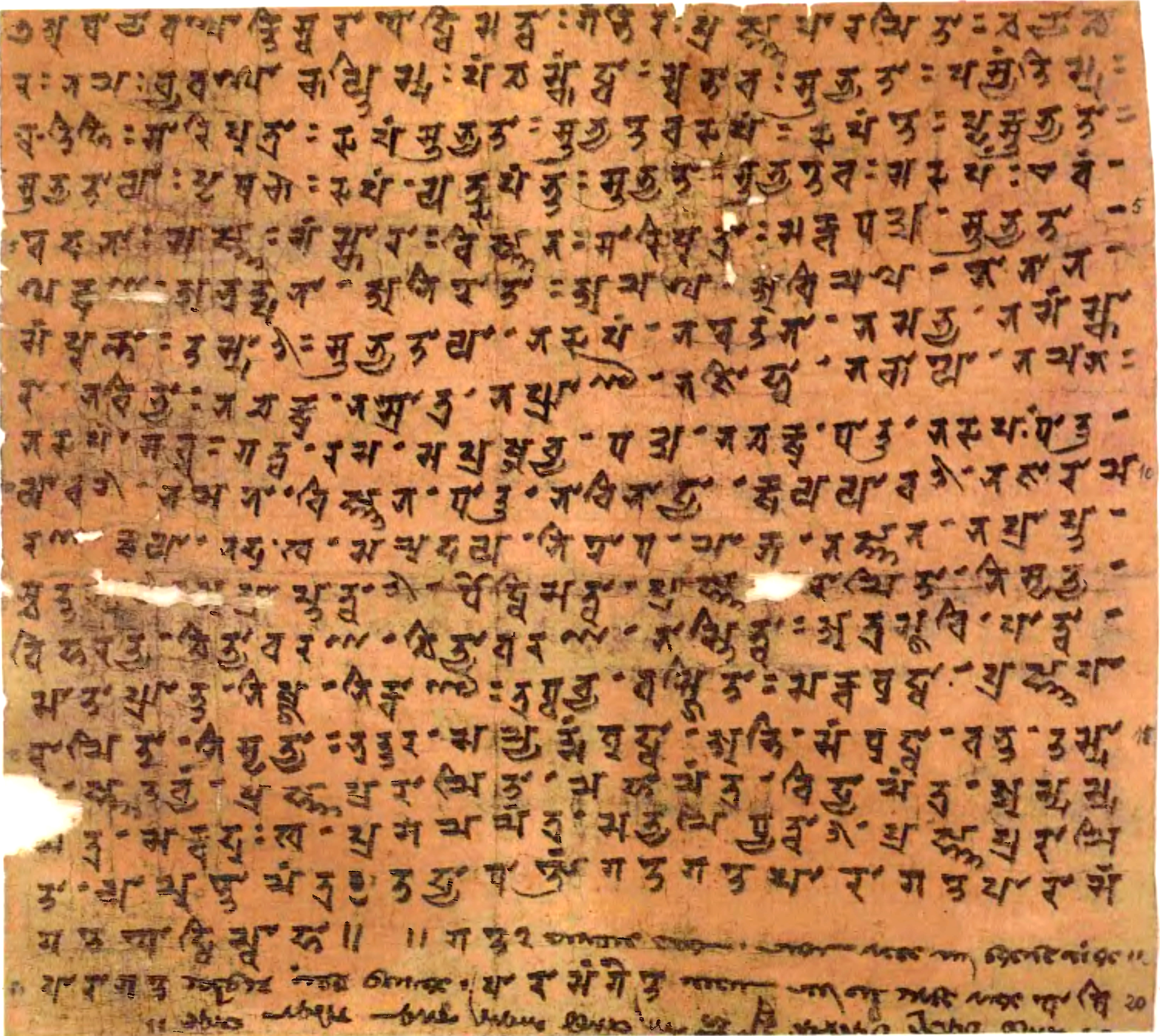
Sanskrit manuscript of the Heart Sūtra in the Siddhaṃ script. Bibliothèque nationale de France

Sanskrit Buddhist literature refers to Buddhist texts composed either in classical Sanskrit, or in a register that has been called "Buddhist Hybrid Sanskrit" (also known as "Buddhistic Sanskrit" and "Mixed Sanskrit"), or a mixture of these two. Several non-Mahāyāna Nikāyas appear to have kept their canons in Sanskrit, the most prominent being the Sarvāstivāda school. Many Mahāyāna Sūtras and śāstras also survive in Buddhistic Sanskrit or in standard Sanskrit.

During the Indian Tantric Age (8th to the 14th century), numerous Buddhist Tantras were written in Sanskrit, sometimes interspersed with local languages like Apabhramśa, and often containing notable irregularities in grammar and meter.

Indian Buddhist authors also composed treatises and other Sanskrit literary works on Buddhist philosophy, logic-epistemology, jatakas, epic poetry and other topics. Sanskrit Buddhist literature is therefore vast and varied, despite the loss of a significant amount of texts. While a large number of works survive only in Tibetan and Chinese translations, many Sanskrit manuscripts of important Buddhist Sanskrit texts survive and are held in numerous modern collections.

Buddhists also wrote secular works on various topics like grammar (vyākaraṇa), poetry (kāvya), and medicine (Ayurveda).

== History ==
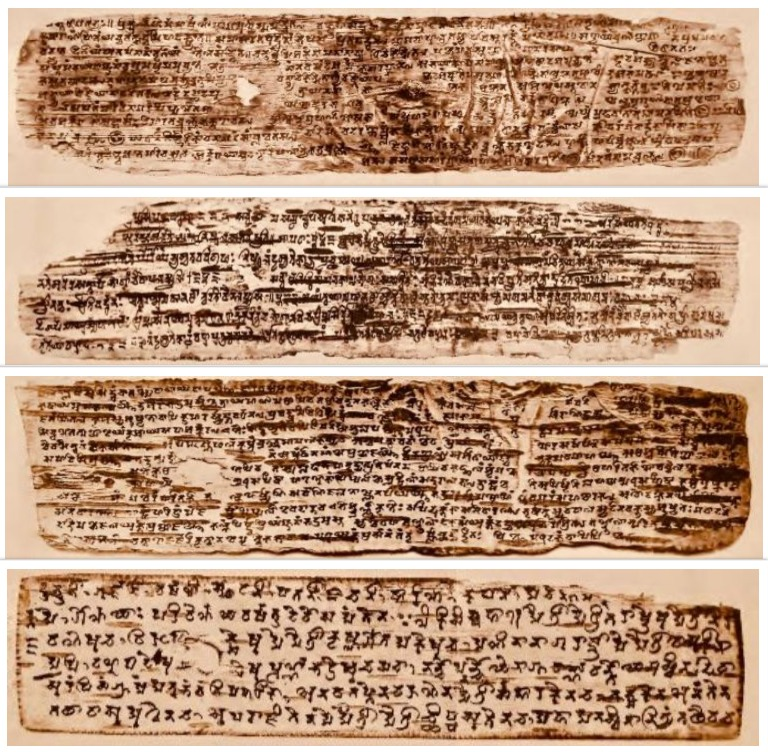
The Bower manuscript, a collection of several Sanskrit texts in the early Gupta script, including an ancient Indian medical treatise dated to about 500 CE. It was discovered in Kucha, Xinjiang.

=== History in India ===
==== The Buddha's teaching on scriptural language ====
The earliest Buddhist texts were orally composed and transmitted in Middle Indo-Aryan dialects called Prakrits. Various parallel passages in the Buddhist Vinayas state that when asked to put the sutras into chandasas the Buddha refused and instead said the teachings could be transmitted in sakāya niruttiyā (Skt. svakā niruktiḥ). This passage was interpreted in different ways in India, China and in Western scholarship. Various translations and passages in Indian Vinaya works interpret chandasas as referring to the language used by Brahmins, i.e. Vedic Sanskrit and sakāya niruttiyā as referring to local vernacular languages or dialects. This view has also been taken by various modern scholars like Franklin Edgerton.

However, the Sarvāstivāda Vinaya texts state that chandasas does not refer to Sanskrit itself, but to a specific Vedic intonation used to chant the Vedas. Scholars like Sylvain Lévi have seen this as an attempt to suppress the Buddha's rejection of Sanskrit but other scholars support the reading of the term nirutti as meaning "intonation", "recitation" or "chant."

The British philologist K.R. Norman defines nirutti as "synonym" or "gloss". Bryan Levman notes that the term can also mean "explanation of words," "grammatical analysis," "etymology," "pronunciation," or "way of expression" according to the Pali-English Dictionary. Levman argues that numerous usages of the term in the Pāli canon support the idea that the term here means a description or "explanation, not necessarily etymological, of the meaning of a word or text." According to Levman, the famous Vinaya passage on language can be seen as meaning that the Buddha did not approve of certain monks who were using their own terms, expressions and explanations instead of the special terminology developed by the Buddha to explain his teachings. When some monks told this to the Buddha, they recommended that the Buddha's word be put in chandasas (Vedic meters and chanting forms), but the Buddha refused and said the teaching should merely be transmitted using his "own terminology" (sakāya niruttiyā).

==== Sanskritization and adoption of Sanskrit ====
Early Buddhists used a variety of related Middle Indic prakrit dialects. The Theravãda tradition eventually adopted one form of Middle Indic, called Pāli, as its canonical language and the Pāli Canon was written down in this language in the 1st century BCE in Sri Lanka. However, in North India and Central Asia, Buddhist texts were transmitted in other prakrits like Gandhari, Northern Buddhist texts were also often sanskritised in varying degrees and translated into other dialects and languages.

Furthermore, from the third century on, new Buddhist texts in India began to be composed in standard Sanskrit. Over time, Sanskrit became the main language of Buddhist scripture and scholasticism in North India. This was influenced by the rise of Sanskrit as a political and literary lingua franca of the Indian subcontinent, perhaps reflecting an increased need for elite patronage. Because of this, many manuscripts from Northern Buddhist traditions are often in Sanskrit, either classical or a non-standard form, often called Buddhist Sanskrit or Buddhist Hybrid Sanskrit (BHS). BHS is an intermediate or mixed language that contains elements of an unknown Middle Indic Prakrit and standard Sanskrit.

Edgerton notes that a striking feature of BHS is that "from the very beginning of its tradition as we know it (that is, according to the mss. we have), and increasingly as time went on, it was modified in the direction of standard Sanskrit, while still retaining evidences of its Middle Indic origin." Buddhist Hybrid Sanskrit works vary in their extent of Sanskritization. Perhaps the earliest of these texts is the Mahavastu (c. 2nd century BCE), which contains only slight Sanskrit elements while later works (such as various Mahayana sutras) are more Sanskritized while also containing unique terminology not found in other standard Sanskrit works.

Sukumar Sen disagreed with Edgerton's view that Buddhist Sanskrit is a "hybrid" language. Sen writes that "Buddhistic Sanskrit is not a hybrid language" and that its structure is that of:

an Indo-Aryan language that was much akin to Sanskrit but unlike it was not rigidly controlled by the grammarians. It was a free kind of language that was used by ordinary men, not aspiring for Hindu scholarship or veneration. It was what may be called Spoken Sanskrit. By its nature it was an unstable literary or business language varying according to time and place. To call such a language 'hybrid' is not correct. Buddhistic Sanskrit was not an artificially made up language fashioned by fusing Sanskrit and the Prākṛits.

Whatever the case, Buddhist Sanskrit became the main religious language used by north Indian Buddhists for religious purposes and over time, these works adopted more standard Sanskrit forms.

The Sanskritization of Buddhist literature was particularly influenced by the north-western Indian Buddhists, especially those of the Sarvāstivāda tradition. During the reign of the Kushan (CE 30-375) emperor Kanishka (128–151 CE), a major Sarvāstivāda Buddhist council seems to have been held, either in Gandhara or Kashmir. During this council, some work was done on the Sarvāstivāda canon, which by now was being transmitted in a form of Sanskrit. The main commentaries of the Sarvāstivāda-Vaibhāṣika were also composed in Sanskrit. An influential and large Sanskrit commentary known as the Mahāvibhāṣa ("Great Exegesis") was also composed around this time. According to Maurice Winternitz, numerous fragments of the Sarvāstivāda Sanskrit canon have survived, especially from archeological findings in East Turkestan, and also from quotations in other sources.

Other Indian Buddhist schools, like the Mahāsāṃghika-Lokottaravāda and Dharmaguptaka schools, also adopted Sanskrit or Sanskritized their scriptures to different degrees.

==== Reasons for the adoption of Sanskrit ====
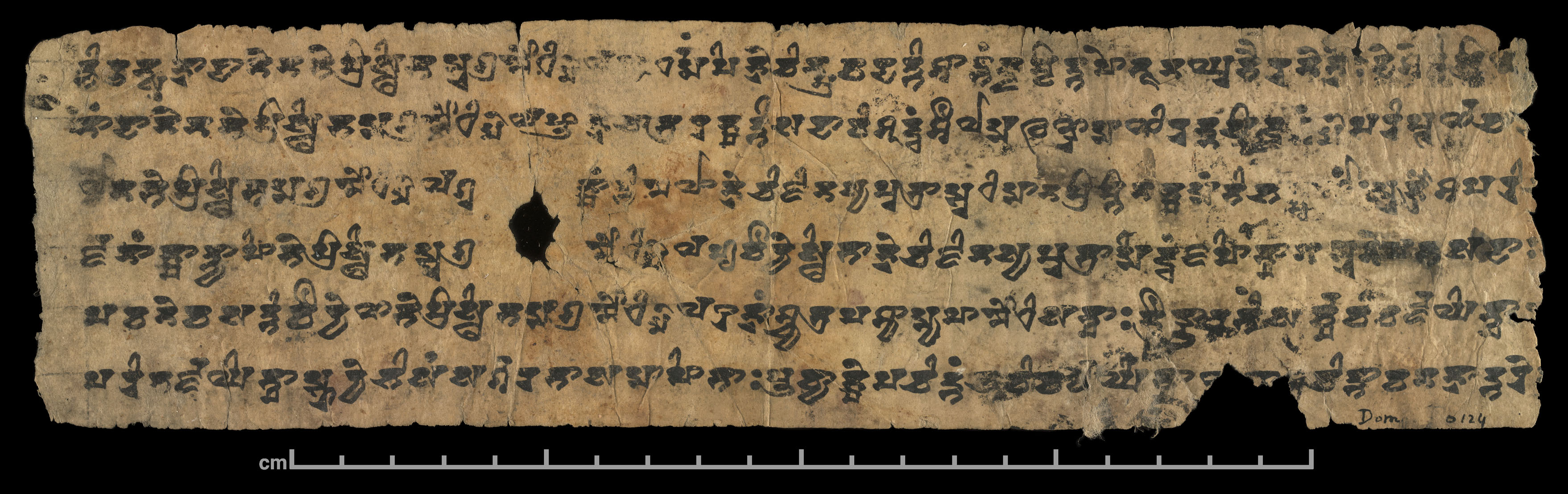
A Sanskrit manuscript of the Lotus Sutra in South Turkestan Brahmi script

Scholars are unsure of what led to the widespread adoption of Sanskrit by Indian Buddhists, and various theories have been offered.

According to Johannes Bronkhorst, part of the reason for the Buddhist adoption of Sanskrit was due to the cultural and political influence of Brahmanas. Since Buddhists became reliant on the support of the royal and elite classes, "the adoption of Sanskrit became a matter of adjusting to the exigencies of the day." Bronkhorst argues that the use of Sanskrit would have eased the interactions between Buddhists and the Sanskrit-speaking royal courts which the Buddhists relied on for material support.

Vincent Eltschinger writes that the few ancient sources which discuss the phenomenon of the Sanskritization of Buddhist texts "justify the recourse, if not directly to Sanskrit, at least to (Sanskrit) grammar, on the basis of the felt necessity to challenge the Brahmins' monopoly on conceptually and formally well-formed language and eloquence. In other words, what these Buddhists were up to might have been self-authorization, didactic skills and superiority in debate." In this view, the prestige of Sanskrit was adopted by the Buddhists in order to legitimate their teachings as authoritative.

This view is supported by certain passages in the texts of the Northern Mahāyāna tradition. For example, the Bodhisattvabhūmi (250-300?) states that "a bodhisattva studies the linguistic science in order to arouse confidence among those who are attached to the Sanskrit language by choosing well-formed phrases and syllables." Also, Sthiramati's (6th century CE?) Sūtrālaṅkāravṛtti bhāṣya states:

A bodhisattva studies the linguistic science (śabdavidyā) both in order to authorize himself among other experts on account of his [own] skill in the Sanskrit language (saṃskṛtalapita) and in order to defeat the allodox teachers (tīrthika) who boast of knowing the linguistic treatise(/science) (śabdaśāstra).

According to Eltschinger, Yogācāra sources like these "ascribe a threefold purpose to the study of (Sanskrit) grammar: authorizing a bodhisattva's speech so that he does not become the target of the sarcasms of pseudo-experts; allowing him to preach the Buddhist Law in a conceptually precise and formally irreproachable language; cause him to possess the eloquence that enables him to defeat his opponents in debate." Another important use of knowing Sanskrit according to Eltschinger was that it allowed Buddhists to study the scriptures of non-Buddhists, with the goal of defeating them in debate.

Some scholars (such as Heinrich Lüders) have also argued that adopting Sanskrit may have been a strategy to convert Brahmins to Buddhism. Alex Wayman argues that many Buddhists were Brahmin converts who felt that Buddhism would be left behind if it did not adopt the prestigious Sanskrit language, but at the same time they wanted to retain some of the Middle Indic forms which they felt were expressions used by the Buddha. Due to this, mixed Sanskrit arose.

Furthermore, Jean Filliozat argued that Sanskrit was adopted because of the need for a lingua franca:

the more the prakrits evolved, the more they became differentiated and the more it became necessary to have recourse to a common language of to communicate in an increasingly vast Buddhist world as well as for active proselytism to many regions. Sanskrit alone was such a language. It was the best instrument of mutual understanding available to the monks of the various provinces who met at the various holy places.

Oskar von Hinüber meanwhile, argued that the Buddhists were just following "a general development within Indian culture" that was not restricted to Buddhism and which saw a process of Sanskritization throughout the subcontinent.

==== The development of Sanskrit Buddhist literature ====
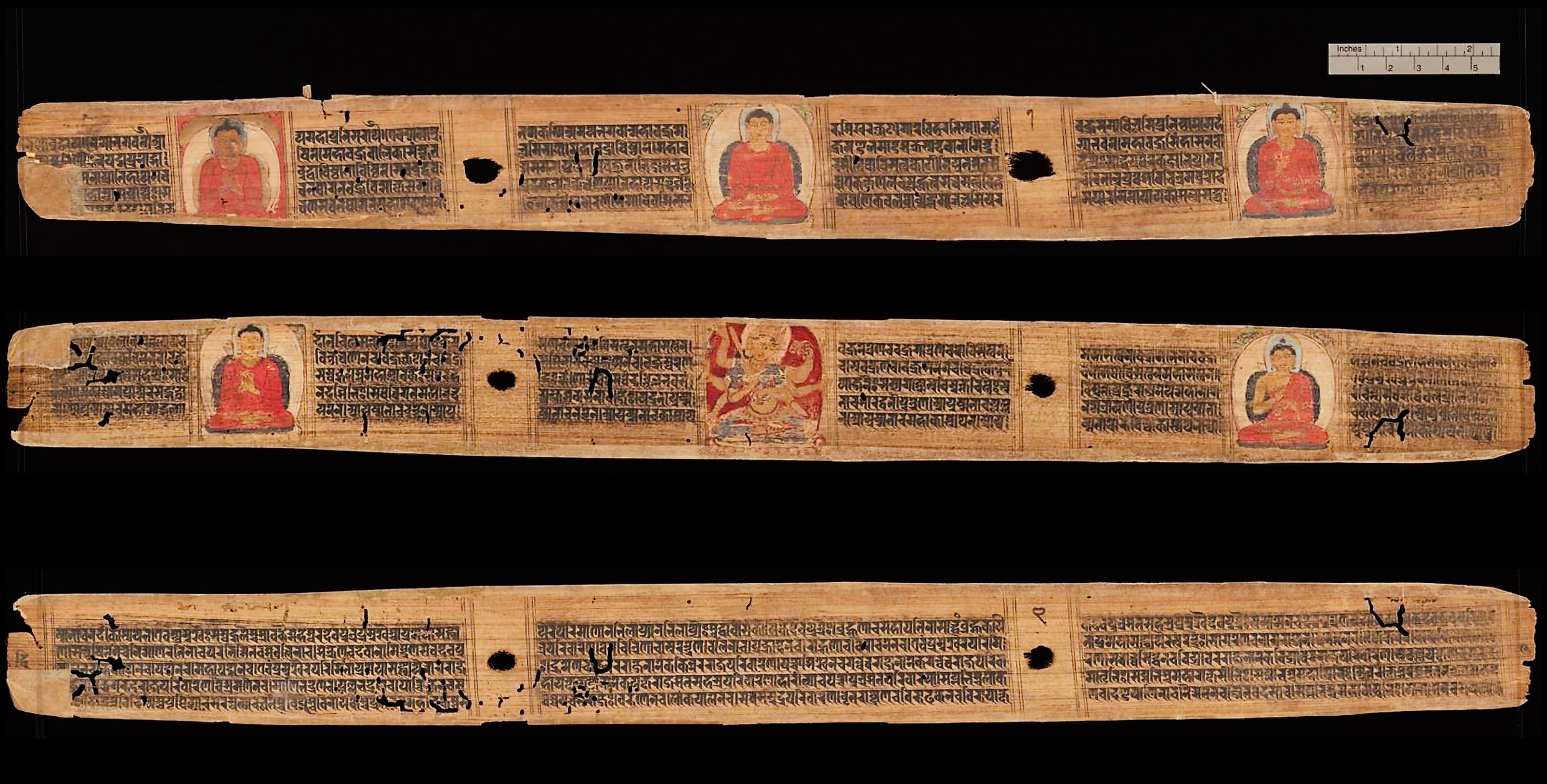
11th-century manuscript of the Pancaraksa dharani

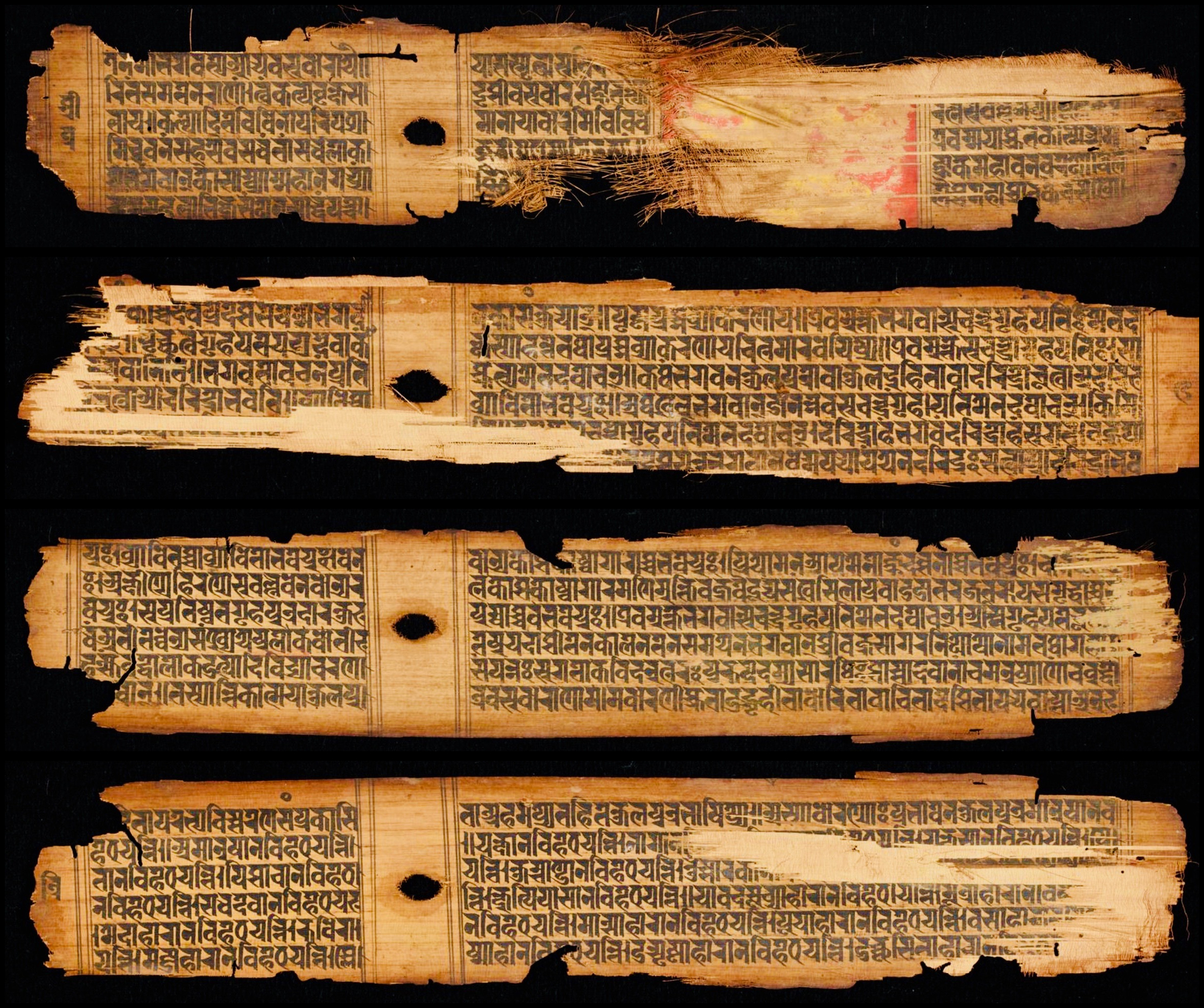
Vasudhara dharani manuscript, Buddhist Sanskrit, Pala script, c. 1123 CE.

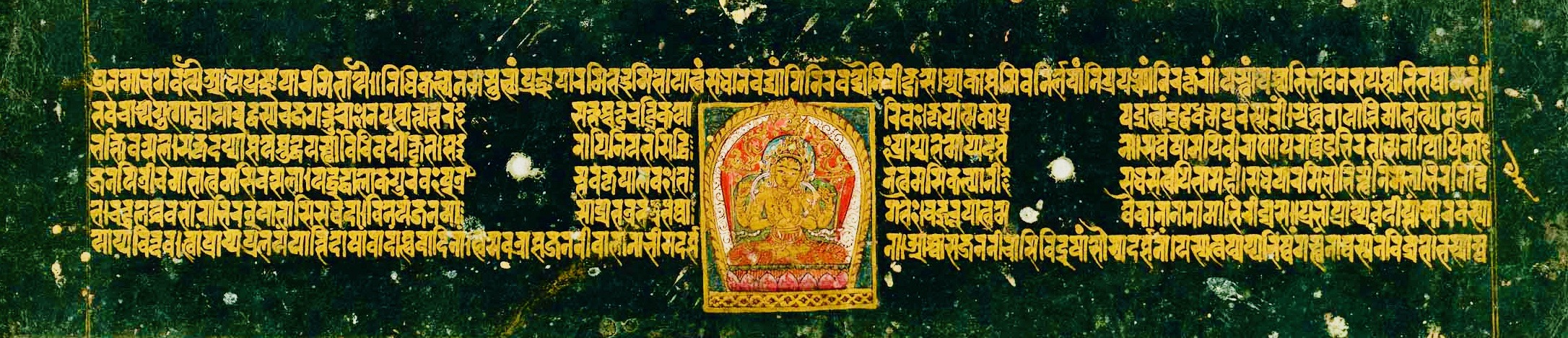
Sanskrit manuscript of the Aṣṭasāhasrikā Prajñāpāramitā Sūtra, in Nepalaksara script.

Seven Leaves from a Manuscript of the Gandavyuha-sutra, Eastern India, Pala period.

The Buddhist use of classical Sanskrit for Buddhist literary purposes possibly began with the poet Aśvaghoṣa (c. 100 CE), author of the Buddhacarita (a mahakavya style epic poem) and one of the earliest Sanskrit dramatists. Aśvaghoṣa was a brahmin and may have had a classic brahminical education according to Winternitz. The poetic works of Aśvaghoṣa and other Sanskrit poets like Mātrceta and Āryaśūra were very popular in India and they were widely recited and memorized according to Yijing.

Sanskrit was also an important language for Mahāyāna Buddhism. Many Mahāyāna sūtras were composed and transmitted in Sanskrit. Some of the earliest and most important Mahāyāna sutras are the Prajñāpāramitā sūtras, many of which survive in Sanskrit manuscripts. Various scholars have argued that many of these Prajñāpāramitā sutras may have developed among the Mahāsāṃghika tradition in the Āndhra region of South India (circa 1st century BCE).

The Indian Buddhist philosophers of the Vaibhāṣika, Sautrāntika, Madhyamaka and Yogācāra schools also mainly wrote in Sanskrit.These include well known figures like Kumāralāta, Nāgārjuna, Āryadeva, Matrcetā, Āryasura, Asaṅga, Vasubandhu, Yaśomitra, Dignāga, Sthiramati, Dharmakīrti, Bhāviveka, Candrakīrti, Śāntideva and Śāntarakṣita.

The Gupta Empire (4th–6th centuries) and Pāla Empire (8th–12th centuries) eras saw the growth of large Buddhist educational institutions like Nālandā and Vikramashila. Maurice Winternitz writes that these large Buddhist universities studied Buddhist philosophy along with "all branches of secular knowledge" for hundreds of years. Chinese pilgrims to India like Yijing also described how, in these universities, the study of Buddhist philosophy was preceded by extensive study of Sanskrit language and grammar.

Great Buddhist philosophers like Dignaga and Dharmakirti taught Buddhist philosophy in these universities in the Sanskrit language. These universities also drew foreign students from as far away as China. One of the most famous of these was the 7th century Chinese pilgrim Xuanzang, who studied Buddhism in Sanskrit at Nālandā and took over 600 Sanskrit manuscripts back to China for his translation project.

The writing of Buddhist Sanskrit has relied on various Indic scripts throughout its history. Early Buddhist Sanskrit works were mainly written in the Brahmi script and also in the Kharosthi script (in Gandhara). Later on, Buddhist Sanskrit works were written using other Indic scripts which developed out of the Brahmi script, mainly the Gupta script and Siddhaṃ (used circa 600 to 1200). Nepalese Buddhist manuscripts tend to use the Rañjanā script or the Newar script.

Some Sanskrit works which were written by Buddhists also cover secular topics, such as grammar (vyākaraṇa), lexicography (koṣa), poetry (kāvya), poetics (alaṁkāra), and medicine (Ayurveda).

During the Indian Tantric Age (8th to the 14th century), numerous Buddhist Tantras and other esoteric literature was written in Sanskrit. Esoteric Buddhist works are unique in that they often contain non-standard (non-Paninian) Sanskrit, prakritic elements and also influences from regional languages like apabhramśa and Old Bengali. This tantric Sanskrit is not the same as Buddhist Hybrid Sanskrit, but a form unique to Buddhist tantric texts which contains few Middle Indic words. These vernacular forms are often in verses (dohas) which may be found within esoteric Sanskrit texts. Examples of such non-standard esoteric Sanskrit texts include the Kṛṣṇayamāri, Caṇḍamahāroṣaṇa and Saṃvarodaya Tantras.

=== Outside of India ===
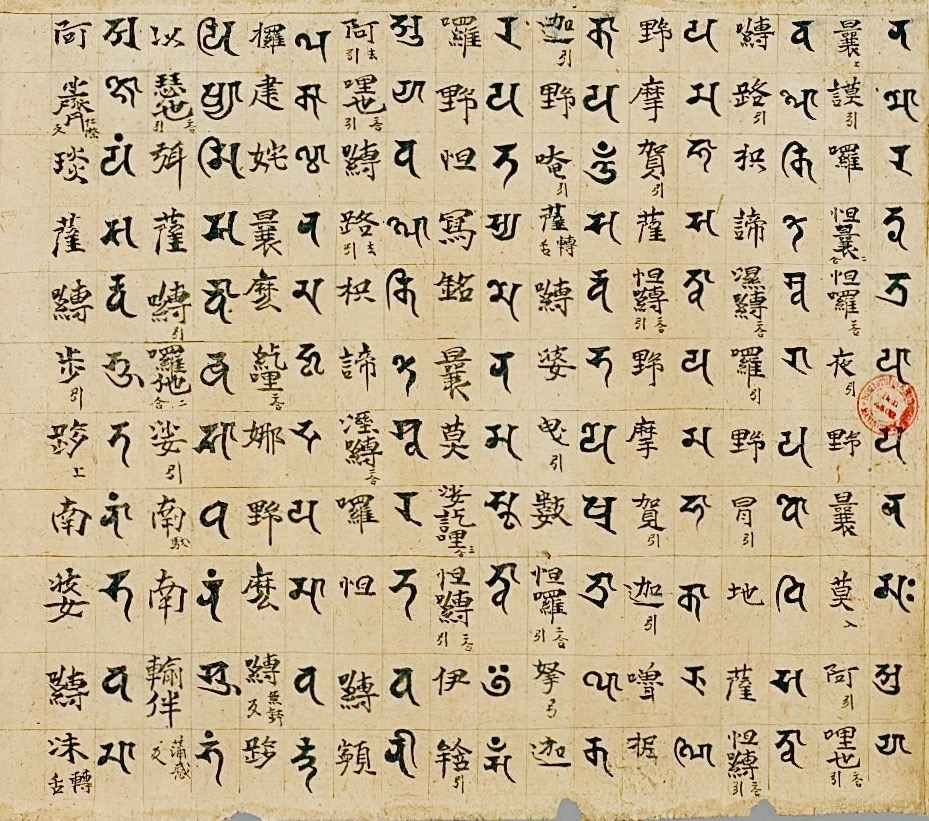
Fragment of the Nilaṇṭhanāmahṛdaya dhāraṇī both written in Siddhaṃ script and transliterated in Chinese characters.

==== East Asia ====
The Silk road transmission of Buddhism during the first millennium saw a widespread exchange of Sanskrit Buddhist literature, with Asians traveling to India to obtain Sanskrit manuscripts and Indians traveling to China and to Central Asia to spread Buddhism. The influence of Buddhist Sanskrit culture was widespread over a large region during this period. The details of this cultural exchange within Asia can be found in classic texts like Faxian's A Record of Buddhist Kingdoms (4th century) and (6th century), and Xuanzang's Record of the Western Regions (7th century).

Buddhist Sanskrit exerted a strong influence on the Chinese language. For example, the Chinese lexicographical practice called fǎnqiè (反切) was influenced by Buddhist Sanskrit. Chinese literary forms and metaphors were also drawn from Sanskrit Buddhist works. Fuwei Chen estimates that around 30,000 Sanskrit words were introduced into Chinese from Sanskrit Buddhist sources. Chinese Buddhists also produced Sanskrit Chinese lexicons, like the Fānfànyǔ (The Translation of Sanskrit, 翻梵語, T. 2130, c. 517), which contains numerous Sanskrit loanwords into Chinese. Some of the most important sources on this cultural exchange come from border regions like Dunhuang and the Mogao Caves.

==== Tibet ====
During the Pāla era, Vajrayāna Buddhism flourished and its texts and scholarship was mainly conducted in Sanskrit. When Vajrayāna spread to the Himalayan regions of Tibet, Bhutan and Sikkim, Sanskrit Buddhist manuscripts and scholars also entered these regions. Medieval Tibet was an important center for the study and translation of Sanskrit Buddhist works, as well as for the study of Indian Sanskrit grammars (such as the Sārasvatavyākaraṇa), poetry and works on poetics (like the Kāvyādarśa), drama (nāṭaka) and other Indian sciences (vidyāsthānas). These Sanskrit sources had a significant impact on Tibetan intellectual culture. According to Matthew Kapstein "during the first centuries of the 2nd millennium Tibetan translators continued to refine their art, producing precise, thorough, and nuanced translations of works of considerable sophistication and difficulty, many of which stand as outstanding achievements of the translator's art even today."

The translation effort was often a collaborative one which involved Indian pandits and Tibetan scholars and the support of Tibetan kings like Thri Songdetsen (742–c.797). This process led to the creation of a new Tibetan literary language, a "dharma language" (chos skad) strongly influenced by Sanskrit, and created for the specific purpose of translating Sanskrit Buddhist texts. It also produced the Mahāvyutpatti, the great Sanskrit-Tibetan dictionary, with a commentary, the Two-Volume Lexicon.

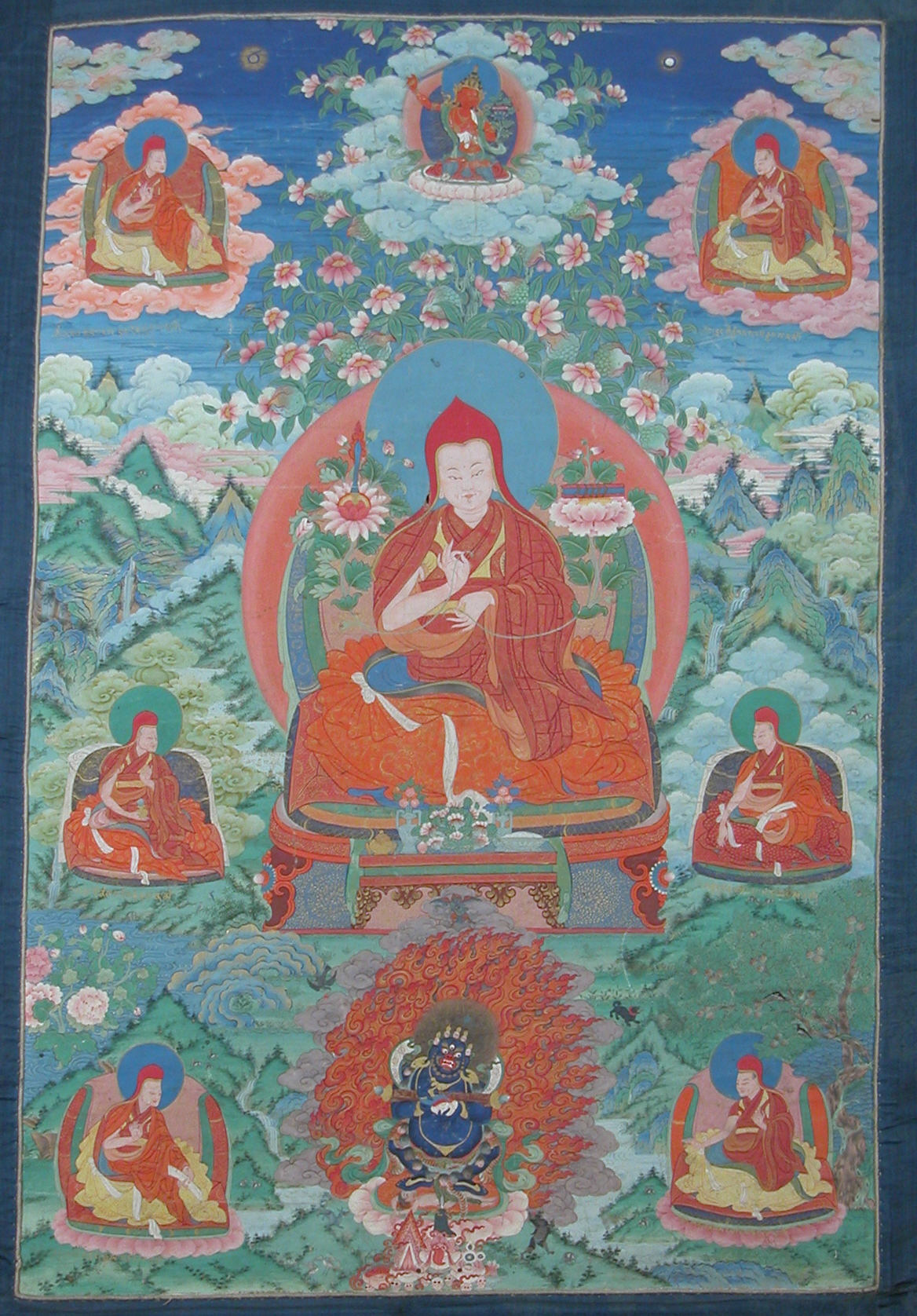
Thangka painting of Sakya Pandita, Eastern Tibet, 18th century

The Tibetan Buddhist scholar Sakya Pandita (1182-1251) was a well known scholar of Sanskrit grammar and literature, and promoted the study of these disciplines among Tibetan scholars during the New translation era. He had studied Sanskrit grammar, poetics, kāvya, lexicography, and drama with Indian pandits like Śākyaśribhadra (who traveled to Tibet and taught numerous Tibetan students). According to Jonathan Gold, Sakya Pandita held that Tibetan scholars needed to form an elite guard to protect the Buddha's Dharma from corruption. Sakya Pandita saw their main intellectual tools as "the great Indian traditions of grammar, literature, and philosophy." Sakya Pandita wrote various works in order to remedy what he saw as a lack of knowledge of classical Indian sciences by Tibetans, such as his Gateway to Learning. Other important Tibetan Sanskritists of the new translation period who also studied Sanskrit with Indian pandits were Chak Lotsawa and Thropu Lotsawa.

Under Sakya Pandita's leadership, Sakya monastery became a major center of Sanskrit and Buddhist learning in Tibet. Sakya Pandita's tradition also promoted the study of the "five sciences" taught at Indian universities as a necessary part of the bodhisattva path. These are: "linguistic science (sabdavidya), logical science (hetuvidya), medical science (cikitsavidya), science of fine arts and crafts (silpakarmasthanavidya), and the spiritual sciences (adhyatmavidya) of the dharma." Sakya Pandita argued that without having some basic knowledge of Sanskrit (or at least without being aware of common Tibetan translation strategies and important Sanskrit terms), Tibetan scholars would make numerous mistakes in interpreting scriptures translated into Tibetan. Thus, for him, the ideal Buddhist scholar had at least some basic knowledge of Sanskrit.

From the 15th century on, Tibetan Buddhists were pioneers in the woodblock printing of Sanskrit works. According to Kapstein, the Tibetans were the first to use printing technology to copy Sanskrit texts. Tibetans also had a developed tradition of Sanskrit calligraphy using numerous scripts. Many manuscripts of Sanskrit Buddhist texts have survived in Tibetan Buddhist monastic libraries. Another influential Tibetan Sanskritist was the Fifth Dalai Lama (1617-1682). He was known for promoting the study of Sanskrit among Tibetan literati. The Fifth's regent, Desi Sangye Gyatso (1653–1705), also continued to promote the study of Sanskrit texts on the "secular sciences" (vidyāsthāna) such as texts on poetics, grammar, astral calculation and medicine. His efforts included ensuring that the Zhol Printing House at the Potala Palace printed editions of the necessary Indian texts.

==== Theravada ====
Even though Sanskrit was not their canonical language, the Theravāda tradition also relied on Sanskrit grammar, poetics and lexicography. Post-canonical Pāli commentaries, sub-commentaries and treatises often quote from Sanskrit grammars, and occasionally reproduce Sanskrit verses. Pali literature in Sri Lankan Buddhism also went through a process of increasing Sanskritization which began during what is called "the reform era" of 1157-1270. During this period, Buddhist monastics began to write new forms of literate Sanskritized Pāli poetry as well as other texts influenced by Sanskrit literature, such as new grammars. One example is Moggallana's Pāli Grammar which is influenced by Sanskrit grammatical works. Medieval Theravādins also studied Sanskrit Buddhist texts from the sub-continent and their works show that they were familiar with Indian Mahāyāna Sanskrit literature.

The use of Sanskrit was also widespread in Southeast Asia (including being used in inscriptions and rituals) during the period before the rise to prominence of Theravãda Buddhism which mostly replaced Hinduism and Mahāyāna Buddhism in Southeast Asia. The Indianization of Southeast Asia and the influence of Southeast Asian Brahmins also led to a broader influence of Sanskrit on South-East Asian cultures which also had an impact on Southeast Asian Buddhism. Sanskrit works like the Rāmāyana and the Dharmaśāstras influenced the literature and culture of these regions and this eventually influenced Buddhism as well.

== Buddhist Sanskrit in the modern era ==
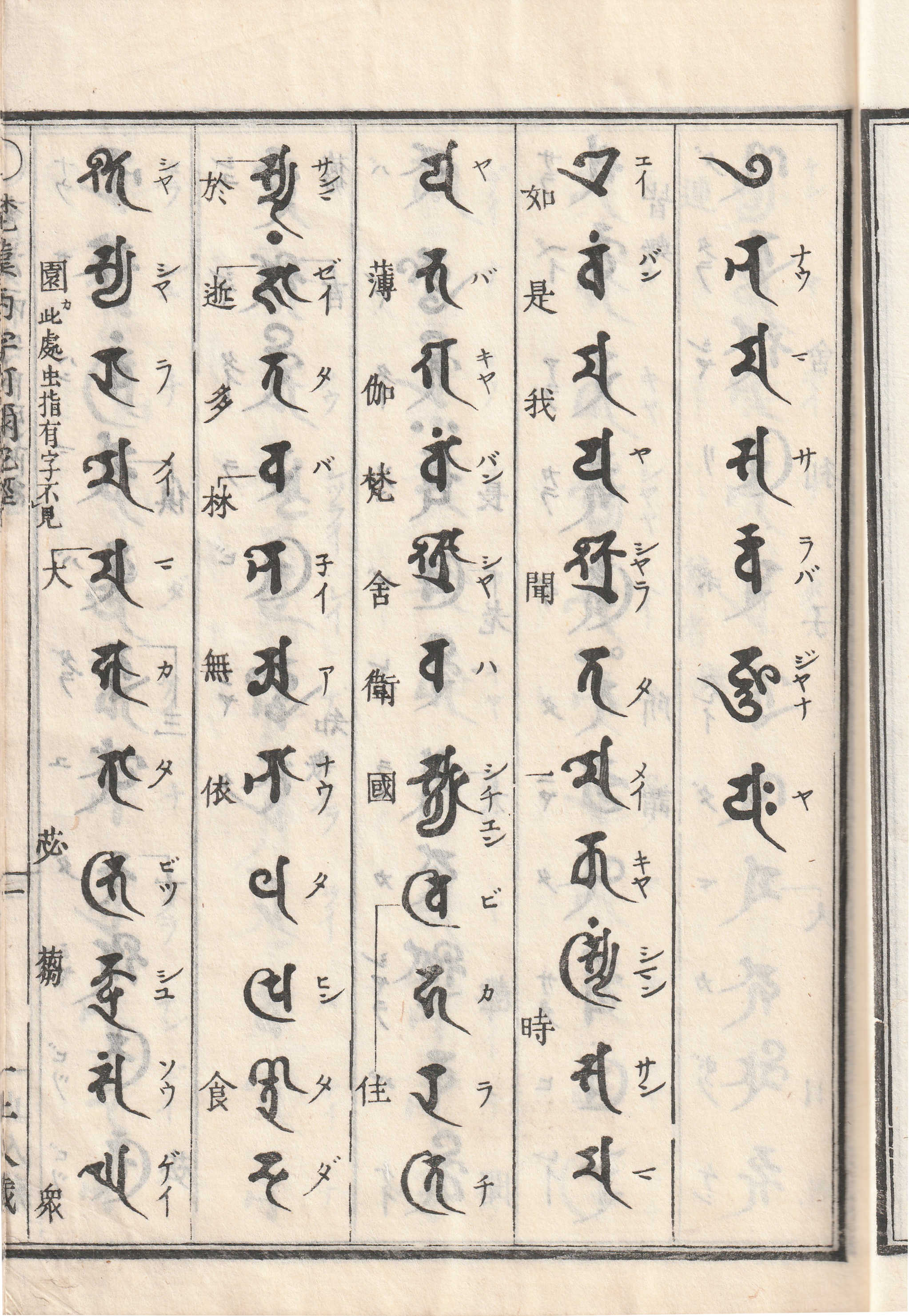
Shorter Sukhāvatīvyūha Sūtra written in katakana, Siddhaṃ scripts and kanji. This book was published in 1773 in Japan.

The decline of Buddhism in India saw the loss of a large number of Sanskrit Buddhist texts. In the modern era, Sanskrit Buddhist texts were discovered in numerous regions, including Nepal, India, Tibet, Gilgit (Pakistan), Sri Lanka etc. Many Sanskrit Buddhist Manuscripts are still in temples, monasteries and private collections and have not been published.

The use of Sanskrit as a sacred language survives in the Newar Buddhism of Nepal, and arguably the vast majority of Sanskrit Buddhist manuscripts have been preserved by this tradition. The Newar tradition most prominently employs Sanskrit for all ritual and study purposes, and as such is the only living Buddhist Sanskrit tradition. It has also produced a number of respected Sanskritists. Nepalese pandits and monastic scholars have contributed to the production and propagation of Sanskrit Buddhist texts and many complete and reliable Sanskrit copies of important Mahāyāna texts have been found in Nepal. This was mainly due to the Newar Buddhist tradition which has copied and transmitted these scriptures up until the present day. Nepalese institutions, such as the National Archives and Asha Archives in Kathmandu and the Rare Sanskrit Buddhist Manuscript Preservation Project in Lalitpur, are at the forefront of the preservation, cataloguing and digitization of Sanskrit Buddhist manuscripts.

Brian Houghton Hodgson was the first Western scholar to bring the Nepalese Buddhist Sanskrit tradition to scholarly attention. Important Sanskrit sutras were published in the 19th century using Nepalese manuscripts, such as the Kāraṇḍavyūha (1873), Lalitavistara (1877) and Aṣṭasāhasrikā Prajñāpāramitā (1888). Many of these Nepalese editions were republished by Parashuram Lakshman Vaidya.

Many Sanskrit Buddhist works have also been unearthed in Central Asia. One major find was at Gilgit in 1931, and most of these are in the National Archives at New Delhi. Another major find was from Eastern Turkestan (1902, 1904, 1905, and 1913) and was found by the German Turfan Expedition. They are kept in the Academy of Sciences, Berlin. A private collection known as the Schøyen collection, are from Bāmiyān, Afghanistan. Another group of Sanskrit texts were discovered by Russian scholars like Sergey Oldenburg and are held by the Russian Academy of Sciences in St. Petersburg.

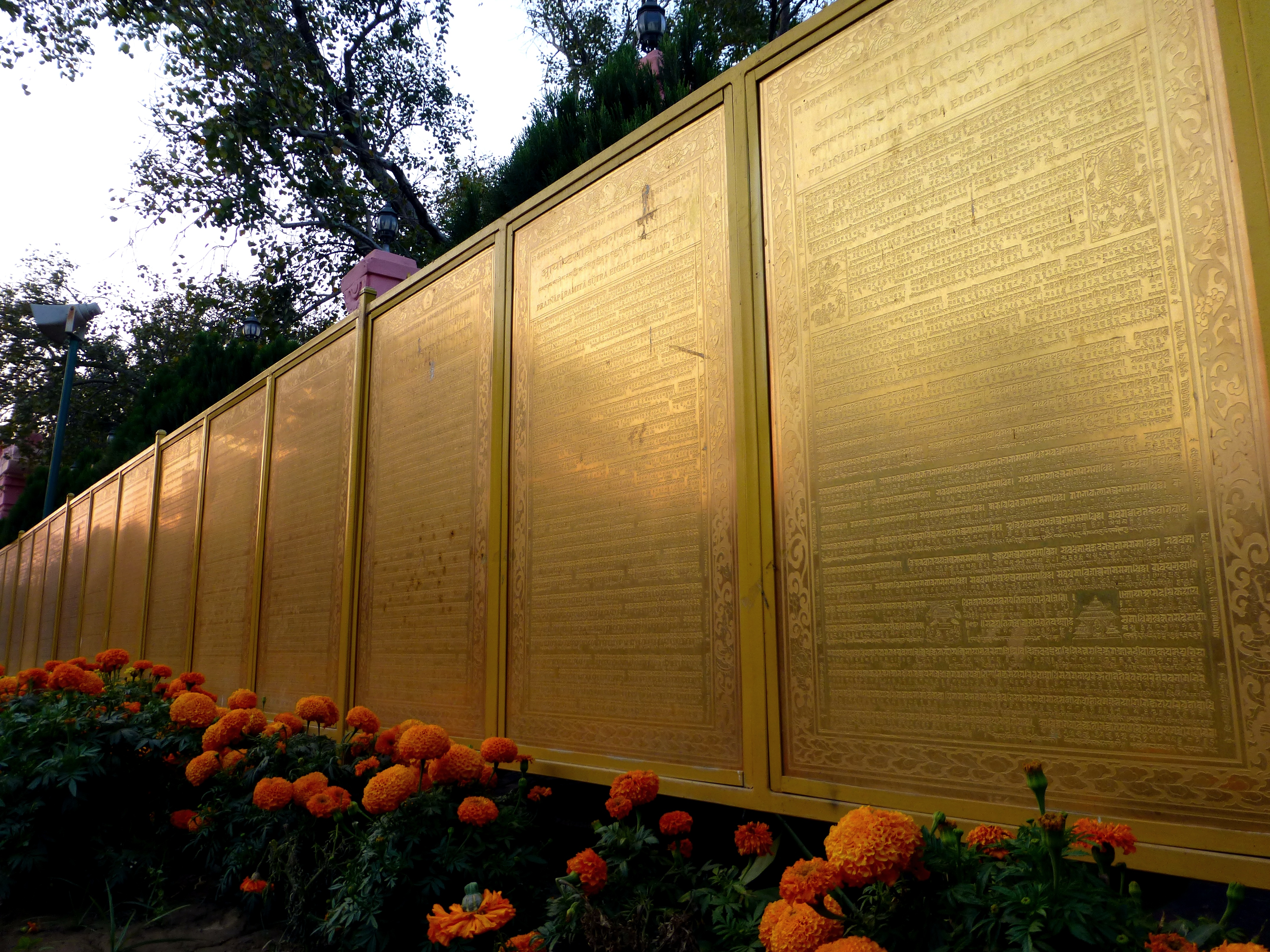
Modern engravings of the Sanskrit Prajñāpāramitā in 8,000 Lines at the Restored Mahabodhi Temple, Bodhgaya, India.

Within East-Asian Buddhism, mantras and dhāranīs are still recited in Sanskrit. Indeed, numerous Buddhist texts in the Taishō Tripitaka contain Siddhaṃ script, such as the Womb Matrix Sanskrit Mantra (T. 854 胎藏梵字真言). Some East Asian Buddhist traditions, like the Japanese Shingon and Tendai schools, are also known for their study of Sanskrit. This is closely connected to the importance of Sanskrit mantras and the influence of the Siddhaṃ script in East Asian Esoteric Buddhism.

The Tibetan Buddhist tradition also retains numerous Sanskrit manuscripts and a tradition of Sanskrit study. Many Sanskrit manuscripts were kept in Tibetan monasteries and in the Potala Palace. Some of these were photographed and catalogued by Rahula Sankrityayan in the 1930s and others are being studied and published by the China Tibetology Research Center in Beijing together with the Austrian Academy of Sciences.

Buddhist Sanskrit texts are also widely studied in modern academic Buddhist studies programs, both in the West and in Asia. Many of these works are important sources for understanding the development of Mahāyāna Buddhism and its spread throughout Asia. The standard writing system for most academic publications on Sanskrit Buddhist texts is the International Alphabet of Sanskrit Transliteration (IAST).

A major milestone in the study of Buddhist Hybrid Sanskrit Literature was Franklin Edgerton's publication of a BHS Dictionary and Grammar, along with a Reader, in 1953.

In 2003, the Digital Sanskrit Buddhist Canon (DSBC) project was initiated by the University of the West (California), in cooperation with the Nagarjuna Institute of Exact Methods (NIEM, Nepal). DSBC (directed by Lewis Lancaster and Min Bahadur Shakya) seeks to collect, digitize and electronically publish Sanskrit Buddhist texts. Part of the project also includes the creation of a reconstructed Sanskrit Buddhist Canon through the compiling of all extant Sanskrit Buddhist Texts. The collection comprising around 545 titles is currently available at Digital Sanskrit Buddhist Canon - Home

== Partial list of extant Sanskrit Buddhist texts ==
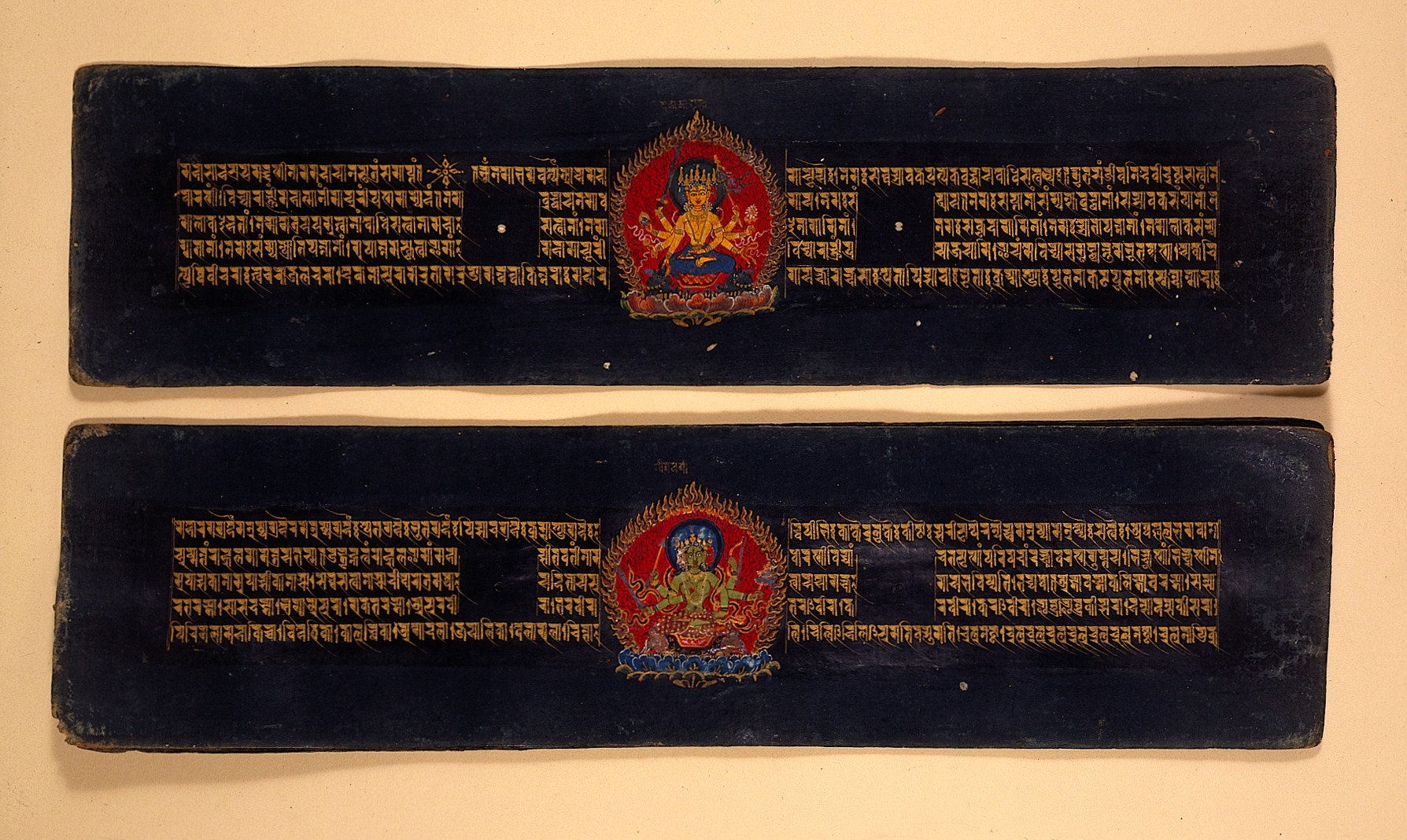
Manuscript of the Pañcarakṣā (CE 1653, Ranjana script), gold ink on black paper.

This list follows the structure of the Digital Sanskrit Buddhist Canon (DSBC) project which divides the collection into a Sutrapiṭaka, Vinayapiṭaka and Śāstrapiṭaka.

=== Sutrapiṭaka ===
This includes numerous categories of Buddhist texts that are considered to fall under the class of "sutra", including:

==== Āgama and early Buddhist texts ====
While there is no Sanskrit manuscript of any single complete Agama collection, many individual texts and fragments have been found, especially in the Tarim Basin and the city of Turfan.

Extant Sanskrit texts which were part of the Sanskrit Sutrapiṭaka include:

- Mulasarvāstivāda Dīrgha Āgama (a nearly complete manuscript has been found). It contains forty-seven discourses. This includes some sutras not found in Pali at all, like the Māyājāla sutra, the Catuṣpariṣat-sūtra and the Arthavistara-sūtra.
- Madhyama āgama (fragmentary).
- Sarvāstivāda Saṃyukta Āgama (fragmentary). The first twenty-five sūtras of the Nidāna-saṃyukta have been preserved and published.
- The Vidyāsthānopama-sūtra (‘Discourse on the Relative Value of the Varieties of Knowledge’), a Saṃyukta Āgama type sutra without any parallels in other canonical collection.
- The Mahāparinirvāṇa Sūtra
- Ekottara Āgama (fragmentary).
- Kṣudrakāgama (only a few texts)
  - The Udānavarga
  - The Sanskrit "Patna Dharmapada"
  - The Sūtra Nipata (fragmentary)
  - Anavataptagāthā
  - Vimānāvadāna (fragments)
  - Sthaviragāthā (fragments)

==== Prajñāpāramitā sutras ====
- Mūlabruhatprajñāpāramitā sutra (Prajñāpāramitā sutra in 125,000 lines).
- Śatasāhasrikā Prajñāpāramitā sutra (Prajñāpāramitā sutra in 100,000 lines)
- Pañcaviṃśatisāhasrikā (25,000 lines)
- Aṣṭadaśasāhasrikā (18,000 lines) (fragments)
- Daśasāhasrikā (10,000) (fragments)
- Aṣtasahasrika (8,000 lines)
- Adhyardhasāhasrikā (2,500 lines)
- Pañcaśatikā (500 lines)
- Vajracchedikā Prajñāpāramitā Sūtra
- Prajñāpāramitā Hṛdaya Sūtra (Heart Sutra)
- Ratnagunasañcayagāthā
- Kauśikaprajñāpāramitāsūtram
- Advayaśatikā
- Suvikrāntavikrāmiparipṛcchā nāma sārdhadvisāhasrikā prajñāpāramitā
- Svalpākṣarā prajñāpāramitā

==== Avataṃsaka sutras ====
- Gaṇḍavyūhasūtra
- Daśabhūmikasūtra

==== Ratnakuta sutras ====
- Kāśyapaparivarta
- Large Sukhāvatīvyūha (Sūtra of the Land of Bliss)
- Sukhāvatīvyūha
- Bhaiṣajyaguruvaidūryaprabharāja sūtra
- Nairātmyaparipṛcchā nāma mahāyānasūtra
- Aparimitayurjnana sutra
- Rāṣṭrapālaparipṛcchā nāma mahāyānasūtram
- Sagarnagarajaparipṛccha sutra
- Triskandhanama Mahayana sutra
- Vimalakīrti Nirdeśa Sūtra
- Akṣayamatinirdeśa

==== Other Mahayana sutras ====
- Arthaviniścayasūtram
- Ārya-ṃaitreya-vyākaraṇaṃ
- Āryapratītyasamutpādo nāma mahāyānasūtra
- Āryasāgaranāgarājaparipṛcchā nāma mahāyānasūtra
- Āryasarvabuddhaviṣayāvatārajñānālokālaṃkāranāma mahāyānasūtra
- Āryatriskandha sūtra
- Āryasaṃghāṭa sūtra
- Bhavasaṅkrānti sūtra
- Catuṣpariṣat sūtra
- Lalitavistaraḥ
- Laṅkāvatāra Sūtra (Descent into Lanka)
- Mahāmegha sūtra
- Mahāparinirvāṇa sūtra
- Saddharmapuṇḍarīkasūtram (Lotus sutra)
- Samādhirāja sūtra (King of Samadhis)
- Sarvatathāgatādhiṣṭhānavyūham sūtra
- Suvarṇaprabhāsa sūtra (Golden Light)
- Śālistamba Sūtra (mostly extant, fully reconstructed by modern scholarship)
- Kāraṇḍavyūhasūtra
- Guṇakāraṇḍavyūhasūtra
- Tathāgataguhyaka (Secrets of the Tathagata)
- Ajitasena Sūtra (Ajitasenavyākaraṇam)
- Saddharmasmṛtyupasthāna sūtra (True-dharma establishing of mindfulness)
- Pratyutpannabuddhasammukhāvaṣṭhitasamādhi Sūtra (The Samādhi of the Direct Encounter with the Buddhas of the Present)
- Vinayaviniścaya upāliparipṛcchā
- Maitreyavyākaraṇa
- Jñānālokālaṃkārasūtra

==== Nirdeśa ====
- Āryābuddhabalādhānaprātihāryavikurvaṇanirdeśanā mamahāyānasūtra
- Āryacaturdharmanirdeśasūtra
- Pratītyasamutpādādivibhaṅganirdeśasūtra
- Svastyayanagāthā

==== Pramāṇa ====
- Nyāyapraveśaka sūtram

==== Dhāraṇī ====
There are numerous surviving dharanis, including those found in several collections from Nepal. Examples include:

- Ārya amoghapāśahṛdaya nāma mahāyānasūtram
- Āryaśrīmahādevīvyākaraṇam
- Ekādaśamukham
- Mahāsannipātaratnaketudhāraṇī sūtraṃ
- Megha sūtra
- Dhāraṇī Saṃgraha (a collection of over 500 dharanis).
- Nīlakaṇṭha Dhāraṇī
- Uṣṇīṣa Vijaya Dhāraṇī
- Nirvikalpapravesadhāraṇī (Dhāraṇī For Entering into the Unmediated State), an influential source for Maitripa's Mahamudra teachings as well as for other Indian masters including Sthiramati, Kamalaśīla, Vimalamitra, Ratnākaraśānti, and Atīśa.

==== Avadāna ====
Numerous collections of past life stories (avadanas) survive in Sanskrit, as well as single avadanas in various manuscripts. The main avadana collections include:

- The Mahāvastu
- Mahāvadānasūtra
- Avadanasataka (100 stories)
- Divyavadāna (38 stories), it frequently quotes from other texts like the Sanskrit Agamas, Udana and Sthavira-gatha.
- Avadānakalpalatā (108 stories) by the Kashmiri poet Kṣemendra
- Kalpadrumāvadānamālā (26 stories)
- Asokavadanamala
- Vicitrakarnika Avadanamala (32 stories)
- Vrata Avadana (3 stories)
- Bhadrakalpāvadāna (34 stories)
- Dvavimsatya Avadana (22 stories)
- Sugata Avadana
- Ratnamala Avadana (12 stories)
- Bodhisattvavadana
- Uposadhavadana
- Suchandravadana
- Kumāralāta's Kalpanāmaṇḍitikā-dṛṣṭānta-paṅkti (mid-second century), fragmentary
- Svayambhū Purāṇa

==== Jataka ====
Past life stories in campū style (mixed verse and prose)

- Saṅghasena's Jātakamālā (third century), fragmentary
- Jātakamālā of Āryaśura
- Jātakamālā of Haribhatta
- Jātakamālā of Gopadatta (eighth century), fragmentary (about half)
- Jñānayaśas' Jātakastava

==== Tantra ====
- Carya tantra
  - Ādikarmapradīpa (a ritual manual)
- Kriyā tantra
  - Āryamañjuśrīmūlakalpam
  - Amoghapāśakalparāja
- Sahajayāna
  - Nānāsiddhopadeśaḥ
- Yoginītantra
  - Cakrasaṃvaratantram
  - Hevajra tantra
  - Buddhakapālatantra
  - Ḍākārṇavaḥ
- Tantra darśana
  - Niṣpannayogāvalī ("Garland of Perfect Yoga"), a compendium of tantric sādhanas with descriptions of maṇḍalas and deities
- Yoga tantras
  - Sarva tathāgata tattva saṅgrahaḥ
  - Sarvadurgatipariśodhana tantra
- Yogottara tantra
  - Advayasiddhiḥ
  - Srivajrabhairava mahayogatantram
  - Caṇḍamahāroṣaṇa tantra
- Anuttarayoga Tantra
  - Śrīguhyasamājatantram
  - Śrīlaghukālacakratantra
  - Āryamañjuśrīnāmasaṅgīti
- Kriyātantraṭīkā
  - Kalpoktamārīcīsādhanam
- Ritual Vrata texts
- Sadhana texts
  - Sādhanamālā (containing 312 sadhanas)

=== Vinayapiṭaka ===
Vinaya texts discuss mainly discuss Buddhist monastic discipline. However, Vinaya texts may also incorporate sutras, avadanas and jataka stories within them. Some Sanskrit Vinayas include:

- Bodhisattva prātimokṣasūtram
- Bhiksu-karmavakya
- Bhiksuni-vinaya
- Mūlasarvāstivāda-vinayavastu
- Prātimokṣasūtram of the Mūlasarvāstivāda school
- Prātimokṣasūtram of the Mahasamghika school
- Prātimokṣasūtram of the Sarvastivada school
- Vinaya sūtram of Gunaprabha
- Vinaya viniscaya Upalipariprccha sutra
- Jayarakṣita's Sphuṭārthā Śrīghanācārasaṃgrahaṭīkā

=== Śāstrapiṭaka ===
This category includes various types of Śāstras, i.e. treatises or scholastic works:

==== Abhidharma ====
- Saṃgītiparyāya (fragments)
- Abhidharmadharmaskandhapadasastra (substantial fragments).
- Jñānaprasthānam śāstram of Katyayaniputra (fragmentary).
- Prajñaptipada (fragments)
- Abhidharma-āmrtaṛasa (The Taste of the Deathless) by the Tocharian Ghoṣaka, 2nd century CE
- Abhidharmakoṣakārikā and the bhāṣya (commentary) of Vasubandhu
- Sthiramati's Tattvārthā Abhidharmakośaṭīkā commentary to the Abhidharmakoṣa (fragmentary).
- Sputarthabhidharmakosavyakhya of Yasomitra (a commentary to the Abhidharmakosa)
- Arthaviniścayasūtranibandhana, commentary of bhikṣu Vīryaśrīdatta on the Arthaviniścayasūtram
- Abhidharmadīpaḥ and Abhidharmadīpa-ṭīkā
- Abhidharmasamuccaya of Asanga
- Abhidharmasamuccaya-bhāṣya (a commentary to Abhidharma-samuccaya)
- Daśākuśalakarmapathadeśanā
- Mahākarmavibhaṅga
- Subodhālaṅkāraḥ

==== Advayatantraṭīkā ====
Commentaries on advaya (non-dual) tantras

- Ḍākinījālasaṃvararahasyam
- Sekoddeśaḥ
- Vāṅmaṇḍalanamaskāraślokāḥ
- Baudha pāribhāṣikāḥ śabdāḥ
- Āryamāyājālamahātantroddhṛtamaṇdalagāthāṭippaṇī
- Laghutantraṭīkā

==== Alaṃkāra (poems) ====
- Chandoratnākaraḥ (svopajña samanvitaḥ)
- Vṛttamālāstutiḥ

==== Stotra (odes) ====
- Ādibuddhadvādaśakastotram
- Advayaparamārthā nāmasaṅgītiḥ
- Ākāśagarbhanāmāṣṭottaraśatastotram
- Maṅgalāṣṭakam
- Avadhānastotram
- Avalokiteśvarāṣṭakastotram (and 17 other stotras to Avalokiteśvarā)
- Daśabhūmīśvaro nāma mahāyānasūtraratnarājastotram
- Caityavandanāstotram
- Cakrasaṃvarastutiḥ
- Gaṇeśa stotram
- Hāratī stotram
- Prajñāpāramitāstotram attributed to Rāhulabhadra
- Dharmadhātunāmastavaḥ (praise to the sphere of reality) and other works attributed to Nagarjuna (Lokātītastavaḥ, Niraupamyastavaḥ, Paramārthastavaḥ)
- The Satapañcasatka and the Catusataka of Matṛceta
- Mahākālastotram
- (Ārya)mañjuśrīnāmāṣṭottaraśatakastotram
- Aryataranamasatottarasatakastotra (eulogy which lists 108 names of Tara)
- Pañcatathāgatastotram
- Various works titled Śākyasiṃhastotram and other stotras to Shakyamuni Buddha
- Bhadracarīpraṇidhānastotram
- Mañjuvajrastotram
- Gururatnatrayastotram
- Mahogratārāṣṭakastotram
- Vajrapāṇināmāṣṭottaraśatastotram
- Vajrasattvastotram
- Vajrayoginyāḥ piṇḍārthastutiḥ
- Kalyanapancavimsatika of Amritananda
- Lokesvara-staka by Vajradatta

==== Darśana ====
- Gurukriyākramaḥ
- Gurupañcāśikā

==== Kāvya (Epic Poetry) ====
- Asvaghosa's Buddhacarita (partial in Sanskrit, complete in Chinese)
- Asvaghosa's Saundaranandam Mahākāvyam
- Buddhavijayakāvyam
- Siddhārthacaritrakāvya
- Sragdharastotra, a kavya poem by Sarvajñamitra in praise of Tara
- Subhāṣitaratnakāraṇḍaka
- Yaśodharācaritam
- Triratnasaundaryagāthā
- Saṅgītamālikā
- Maitreyavyakarana (prophecy of Maitreya) of Aryacandra (fragmentary)
- Padyacūḍāmaṇi (an epic life of the Buddha) by Buddhaghoṣa (not to be confused with the Pali commentator of the same name)

==== Kośa ====
- Arthaviniścaya nibandhana
- Dharmasaṃgrahaḥ
- Dharmasamuccayaḥ
- Mahāvyutpatti
- Lupta bauddhavacana saṁgraha

==== Lekha (poetic epistles) ====
- Ratnāvalī (Nagarjuna)
- Śiṣyalekha (Chandragomin)
- Suhṛllekhaḥ (Nagarjuna)
- Daṇḍikathā
- Vimalaratnalekhaḥ

==== Prajnaparamita śāstras ====
- Abhisamayālaṇkāra-loka
- Abhisamayālaṅkārāntaḥ-pātināṃ-padārthānāṃ
- Abhisamayālaṅkāra-vṛttiḥ-sphuṭārthā
- Āryaprajñāpāramitāvajracchedikāṭīkā
- Pāramitāsamāsaḥ
- Sāratamākhyā pañjikā (a pañjikā on the Aṣṭasāhasrikā Prajñāpāramitā by Ratnākaraśānti)
- Asaṅga's Triśatikāyāḥ prajñāpāramitāyāḥ kārikāsaptatiḥ
- Kamalaśīla's Vajracchedikāṭīkā

==== Madhyamaka śāstras ====
- Mūlamadhyamakakārikā, Vigrahavyāvartanī, Yuktiṣaṣṭikārikā and other works by Nagarjuna
- Akutobhaya (a commentary on the Mūlamadhyamakakārikā)
- Catuḥstava (Four Hymns) of Nagarjuna
- Amṛtākara's Catuḥstavasamāsārtha, commentary on the Catuḥstava
- Catuḥ śatikā of Āryadeva
- Hastavālaprakaraṇa
- Śikṣāsamuccaya-kārikā by Shantideva
- Madhyamakahṛdayaḥ by Bhāviveka
- Madhyamakālokaḥ by Kamalaśīla
- Mahāyānaviṃśikā
- Prajñāpradīpaḥ by Bhāviveka
- Madhyamakāvatāra (Entering the Middle Way) by Candrakīrti
- Prasannapadā (madhyamakavṛtti) by Candrakīrti
- Pratītyasamutpādahṛdayavyākhyānam
- Bodhicaryāvatāraḥ by Shantideva
- Bodhicaryāvatāraḥ pañjikā of Prajñākaramati
- Śikṣāsamuccayaḥ by Shantideva
- Bodhipathapradīpaḥ of Atiśa Dīpankara Śrījñāna

==== Yogācāra śāstras ====
- Yogācārabhūmiḥ
- Abhisamayalankara
- Mahāyānasūtrālamkārakārikā and Vasubandhu's Bhāṣya
- Madhyāntavibhāga kārikāḥ
- Pañcaskandhaprakaraṇam
- Bhavasaṅkrāntiṭīkā
- Bodhicittotpādasūtraśāstra
- Ratnagotravibhāga
- Madhyanta-vibhaga-karika
- Mahāyānasaṃgraha of Asanga
- Trisvabhāva-nirdeśa by Vasubandhu
- Vimśatikāvijñaptimātratāsiddhi by Vasubandhu
- Triṃśikā-vijñaptimātratā by Vasubandhu
- Viṃśatikā vijñaptimātratāsiddhiḥ by Vasubandhu

==== Madhyamaka-yogācāra śāstras ====
- Bhāvanākramaḥ by Kamalaśīla
- Caryāsaṅgrahapradīpaḥ
- Cittotpādasaṃvaravidhikramaḥ
- Mahāyānapathasādhanasaṅgrahaḥ
- Tattvasaṃgraha of Śāntarakṣita and its commentary by Kamalaśīla
- Munimatālaṃkāra of Abhayākaragupta (composed 1113).

==== Nāṭaka ====
- Buddhamatam
- Nāgānandam nāṭaka
- Nālandādahanam

==== Nīti ====
- Nītiśāstram
- Śatagāthā

==== Pramāṇa śāstras ====
- Ālambanaparīkṣā and Ālambanaparīkṣāvṛttiḥ by Diṅnāga
- Apohasiddhiḥ of Ratnakīrti
- Hetubinduḥ of Dharmakīrti
- Hetubinduṭīkā
- Kṣaṇabhaṅgasiddhiḥ
- Nyāyabindu prakaraṇakārikā of Dharmakīrti
- Nyāyabinduṭīkā of Dharmottara
- Pramāṇavārtikam and Pramāṇavarttikasvavṛti of Dharmakīrti
- Pramāṇavārttikālaṅkāra by Prajñākaragupta
- Various texts by Śaṅkaranandana, including Prajñālaṅkārakārikā, Sarvajñasiddhisaṅkṣepa, Sarvajñasiddhikārikā, Āgamaprāmāṇya-kārikā
- Numerous texts by Jñānaśrīmitra such as the Apohaprakaraṇa, Advaitabinduprakaraṇa, Anupalabdhirahasya, Bhedābhedaparīkṣā and Vyāpticarcā
- Ratnakīrti nibandhāvalī
- Hetutattvopadeśa by Jitāri
- Santānāntarasiddhiḥ
- Tarkaśāstram
- Udayananirākaraṇam
- Vajrasūcī

==== Sautrāntika śāstras ====
- Satyasiddhiśāstram

==== śilpaśāstra ====
- Ātreyatilakam
- Citrakarmaśāstram
- Kriyāsaṃgrahakārikā

==== Vividha ====
- Āryaśālistambakakārikā
- Āryaśālistambakamahāyānasūtraṭīkā
- Tarkabhāṣā
- Vajrayāna darśana mīmāṁsā

==== Yoginītantraṭīkā ====
Commentaries on Yoginītantras:

- Tattvaratnāvalī
- Kāṇhapādasya dohākoṣaḥ
- Guhyāvalī
- Mahāmāyātantram [guṇavatīṭīkāsahitam]
- Tattvajñānasaṃsiddhiḥ
- Śrīcakrasambarābhisamayavyākhyā

==== Anuttarayogatantraṭīkā ====
- Vimalaprabhā (Stainless Light, a commentary to the Kalachakra tantra)
- Vajravali by Abhayākaragupta

==== Yogottaratantraṭīkā ====
Commentaries on Yogottaratantras:

- Cittaviśuddhiprakaraṇa
- Pañcakramaḥ ("Five Stages" of Guhyasamaja yoga)
- Śrīguhyasamājamaṇḍalavidhiḥ
- Tattvaratnāvalokaḥ

==== Mahāyogatantraṭīkā ====
Commentaries on Mahāyogatantras

- Guhyāsamājatantrapradīpodyotanaṭīkā ṣaṭkoṭivyākhyā
- Mañjuvajramukhyākhyāna

==== Tantric Prakaraṇas ====
- Guhyadi-astasiddhi-samgraha (known as 'the Seven Siddhi texts' in Tibetan Mahamudra): Padmavajra's Guhyasiddhi, Prajñopayaviniscayasiddhi, Indrabhūti’s Jñānasiddhi, Advayasiddhi, Guhyatattva, Yogini Cinta, and Sahajasiddhi.
- Advayavajrasaṇgrahaḥ (works of Advayavajra/Maitripa, with 25 amanasikara works which are key to the Mahamudra tradition).
- Rāmapāla's Sekanirdeśapañjikā, a commentary by Rāmapāla on the Sekanirdeśa (also called Sekanirdeśa) of his teacher Advayavajra (Maitreya/Maitrīpa).
- Caryāmelāpakapradīpa (The Lamp That Integrates the Practices) by the Tantric Aryadeva
- Cittaviśuddhiprakaraṇa by the Tantric Aryadeva
- Svādhiṣṭhānakramaprabheda by the Tantric Aryadeva
- Śāntarakṣita's (perhaps a pseudo-Śāntarakṣita) Tattvasiddhi
- Śrīlakṣmī or Lakṣmīkarā's Advayasiddhir nāma sādhanopāyikā
- Subhāṣitasaṃgraha (A Collection of Aphoristic Statements)
- Yuktipradīpa or Yuktidīpa (A Lamp of Reasoning)
- Ratnavajra’s Caturthasadbhāvopadeśa
- Tattvaratnāvalokavivaraṇa (An Elucidation of “A consideration of Precious Reality by Vāgīśvarakīrti

==== Vyākaraṇa ====
- Paribhāṣāvṛtteh
- Laghukaumudīvyākaraṇam

==== Jyotiḥśāstra (astrological treatises) ====
- Kālacakrāvatāraḥ

==== Sanskrit Drama ====
- Asvaghosha's Sariputraprakaraṇa (partial, ninth and last chapters)
- Śrī Harṣa's Nāgānanda, tells the story of the Bodhisattva Jīmūtavāhavana

==== Dohas (songs) ====
- Kṛṣṇapa's (10th-11th century) Dohākoṣa and its two commentaries (Dohākoṣaṭīke).

==== Grammar ====
Buddhist Indian authors composed numerous works on Sanskrit Grammar, such as:

- The Kaumāralāta (the earliest of these grammatical works by a Buddhist) which also covers some non-standard Middle Indic forms of Buddhist Sanskrit
- Sarvavarman's Kātantra, a very popular work which was widely used by Buddhists
- Durgasimha's commentary (vrtti) on the Kātantra (c. between the sixth and eighth cent.)
- Candragomin's Cāndravyākaraṇa (c. 450 CE) and its vrtti

==== Ayurveda ====
- The medical treatise found in the Bower Manuscript, which contains one of the earliest Ayurvedic treatises written in Buddhist Hybrid Sanskrit.
- Vāgbhaṭa's Aṣṭāṅgahṛdayasaṃhitā (7th century) is a work of medicine influenced by Mahayana Buddhist principles.
- The Jīvakapustaka, which presents itself as being the work of Jīvaka, the Buddha's personal physician.

== See also ==
- Buddhist texts
- Gandharan Buddhist Texts
- Sanskrit literature
- Pali literature
- Sanskrit revival
- Sanskrit-related topics
- List of Sanskrit universities in India
- List of Sanskrit academic institutes outside India
- List of historic Sanskrit texts
- List of Sanskrit poets
- Symbolic usage of Sanskrit
- Sanskrit Wikipedia

== Sources ==
=== Sources ===
- Bingenheimer, Marcus; Bhikkhu Anālayo; Bucknell, Roderick S. The Madhyama Āgama: Middle Length Discourses Vol I (Taishō Volume 1, Number 26). Bukkyo Dendo Kyokai America, Inc. 2013. BDK English Tripiṭaka Series.
- Bronkhorst, Johannes (2011). Buddhism in the Shadow of Brahmanism. Handbook of Oriental Studies (Leiden: Brill).
- Edgerton, Franklin (1953). Buddhist Hybrid Sanskrit Grammar and Dictionary, Volume 1, pp. 1–3. MOTILAL BANARSIDASS. ISBN 0-89581-180-4.
- Nariman, J. K. (1972). Literary History of Sanskrit Buddhism. Orient Book Distributors.
- Winternitz, Maurice (1972). A History of Indian Literature Vol. II. Buddhist literature and Jaina literature. Oriental Books Reprint Corporation.
