= List of people from Gandhara =

Gandhara was an ancient region in the north-west of Pakistan and parts of north-east Afghanistan from Peshawer basin and Swat Valley going far up to Kabul and the Pothohar Plateau. This region played an important role in the history of South Asia and East Asia. Following is the list of important Gandharans from modern day's Gandhara region in chronological order;

== Scholars ==
Important Gandharans who influenced Ancient India include;

- Pāṇini (5th century BC), born in Śalatura he was a Sanskrit philologist, grammarian, and a revered scholar from Gandhara. Pāṇini is known for his text Aṣṭādhyāyī, a sutra-style treatise on Sanskrit grammar.

== Founders of Buddhist schools ==
Founders of various Buddhist schools and traditions from Gandhara are as follows;

- Kumāralāta (3rd century), born in Takshashila (Taxila) Kumāralāta was the founder of Sautrāntika school of Buddhism, one of original Buddhist schools. He was author of a "collection of dṛṣtānta" (Dṛṣtāntapaṅkti) called the Kalpanāmaṇḍitīkā. Sautrāntika school's teaching latter influenced formation of Jōjitsu school of Japanese Buddhism.
- Vasubandhu (4th century), Born in Puruṣapura (Peshawer) Vasubandhu is considered one of the most influential thinkers in the Gandharan Buddhist philosophical tradition. In Jōdo Shinshū (most widely adhered branch of Japanese Buddhism), he is considered the Second Patriarch; in Chan Buddhism, he is the 21st Patriarch. His Abhidharmakośakārikā ("Commentary on the Treasury of the Abhidharma") is widely used in Tibetan and East Asian Buddhism.
- Asaṅga (4th century), Born in Puruṣapura (Peshawer) he was "one of the most important spiritual figures" of Mahayana Buddhism and the "founder of the Yogachara tradition of East Asia ". His writing includes Mahāyānasaṃgraha (Summary of the Great Vehicle) and Abhidharma-samuccaya.

== Translators ==
Important Gandharans who played a significant role in translation of buddhist texts from Sanskrit into Chinese are as below;

- Zhi Yao (2nd century), translated important Buddhist texts into Chinese during era of Han dynasty of China.
- Lokakṣema (2nd century), translated important Sanskrit sutras into Chinese, during the rule of Han dynasty of China.
- Jñānagupta (6th century), translated 39 scriptures in 192 fascicles during the period 561 to 592 into Chinese during the rule of Sui dynasty of China.
- Prajñā (9th century), translated important Sanskrit sutras into Chinese during the rule of Tang dynasty of China.
- Dānapāla (11th century), was a Buddhist monk and prolific translator of Sanskrit Buddhist sutras during the Song dynasty in China

== Rulers ==
During the ancient era (500 BC-500 AD) there were multiple independent Gandharan rulers. Notable in this era were:

- Porus the Elder (4th century BC), ruler of Eastern Gandhara
- Ambhi (4th century BC), ruler of Taxila
- Peithon (son of Agenor) (4th century BC), Greek ruler of Gandhara
- Pantaleon (2nd century BC), first Indo Greek ruler of Gandhara
- Menander I (2nd century BC), first Buddhist Indo-Greek ruler of Gandhara
- Archebius (1st century BC), last Indo-Greek ruler of Gandhara
- Maues (1st century BC), first Indo-Scythian ruler of Gandhara
- Kharahostes (1st century BC), last Indo-Scythian ruler of Gandhara
- Gondophares (1st century AD), first Indo-Parthian ruler of Gandhara
- Pacores (1st century AD), last Indo-Parthian ruler of Gandhara
- Vima Takto (1st century AD), first Kushan ruler of Gandhara
- Kanishka (2nd century AD), first Buddhist Kushan ruler of Gandhara
- Kipunada (4th century AD), last Kushan ruler of Gandhara
- Kidara I (4th century AD), first Kidarite ruler of Gandhara
- Kandik (5th century AD), last Kidarite ruler of Gandhara

== Others ==
- Marananta (4th century), brought Buddhism to Korean Peninsula.

== See also ==
- Kushan Empire
