= Buddhist Hybrid Sanskrit =

Language used in Buddhist texts

- BHS
- Region: Northern India
- Language family: Indo-European: Indo-Iranian; Indo-Aryan; Middle Indo-Aryan; Buddhist Hybrid Sanskrit

Language codes
- ISO 639-3: –
- Glottolog: budd1234
- IETF: sa-bauddha

Buddhist Hybrid Sanskrit (BHS) is a modern linguistic category applied to the language used in a class of Indian Buddhist texts, such as the Perfection of Wisdom sutras. BHS is classified as a Middle Indo-Aryan language. It is sometimes called "Buddhist Sanskrit" or "Mixed Sanskrit".

== Origin ==
Prior to this, Buddhist teachings are not known to have generally been recorded in the language of the Hindu elite. At the time of the Buddha, instruction in this language was restricted to Vedic study. While Gautama Buddha was probably familiar with what is now called Sanskrit, his teachings were apparently first promulgated in local languages. At one point he ruled against translating his teachings into Vedic, saying that to do so would be foolish—Vedic was by that time an archaic and obsolete language.

After the work of the ancient Sanskrit philologist Pāṇini, Sanskrit became the pre-eminent language for literature and philosophy in India. Buddhist monks began to adapt the language they used to it while remaining under the influence of a linguistic tradition stemming from the proto-canonical Prakrit of the early oral tradition. While there are widely differing theories regarding the relationship of this language to Pāli, it is certain that Pāli is much closer to this language than Sanskrit is.

According to K. R. Norman, Pāli could also be considered a form of BHS. However, Franklin Edgerton states that Pāli is in essence a Prakrit.

== Relation to Sanskrit and Pāli ==
In many places where BHS differs from Sanskrit it is closer to, or identical with, Pāli. Most extant BHS works were originally written in BHS, rather than being reworkings or translations of already existing works in Pāli or other languages. However, earlier works, mostly from the Mahāsāṃghika school, use a form of "mixed Sanskrit" in which the original Prakrit has been incompletely Sanskritised, with the phonetic forms being changed to the Sanskrit versions, but the grammar of Prakrit being retained. For instance, Prakrit bhikkhussa, the possessive singular of bhikkhu (monk, cognate with Sanskrit bhikṣu) is converted not to bhikṣoḥ as in Sanskrit but mechanically changed to bhikṣusya.

The term owes its usage and definition largely to the scholarship of Franklin Edgerton. Buddhist Hybrid Sanskrit is primarily studied in the modern world in order to study the Buddhist teachings that it records, and to study the development of Indo-Aryan languages. Compared to Pāli and Classical Sanskrit, comparatively little study has been made of Buddhist Hybrid Sanskrit, in part because of the fewer available writings, and in part because of the view of some scholars that BHS is not distinct enough from Sanskrit to comprise a separate linguistic category. Edgerton writes that a reader of a Buddhist Hybrid Sanskrit text "will rarely encounter forms or expressions which are definitely ungrammatical, or at least more ungrammatical than, say, the Sanskrit of the epics, which also violates the strict rules of Pāṇini. Yet every paragraph will contain words and turns of expression which, while formally unobjectionable ... would never be used by any non-Buddhist writer."

Edgerton holds that nearly all Buddhist works in Sanskrit, at least until a late period, belong to a continuous and broadly unitary linguistic tradition. The language of these works is separate from the tradition of Brahmanical Sanskrit, and goes back ultimately to a semi-Sanskritized form of the protocanonical Prakrit. The peculiar Buddhist vocabulary of BHS is evidence that BHS is subordinate to a separate linguistic tradition quite separate from standard Sanskrit (Edgerton finds other indications as well). The Buddhist Brahmanical writers who used standard Brahmanical Sanskrit were small in number. This group seems to have been made up of converts who received Brahmanical training in their youth before converting to Buddhism, such as Aśvaghoṣa.

Many Sanskrit words, or particular uses of Sanskrit words, are recorded only from Buddhist works. Pāli shares a large proportion of these words; in Edgerton's view, this seems to prove that most of them belong to the special vocabulary of the protocanonical Buddhist Prakrit.

== Buddhist use of Classical Sanskrit ==
Not all Buddhist use of Sanskrit is in a hybrid form. Some translated works, such as by the Sarvāstivādin school, were completed in classical Sanskrit. There were also later works composed directly in Sanskrit and written in a simpler style than the classical literature, as well as works of kavya in the ornate classical style such as the Buddhacarita.

== Parallels ==
The terms "Buddhist Hybrid Chinese" and "Buddhist Hybrid English" have been used to describe peculiar styles of language used in translations of Buddhist texts.
