= Kumāralāta =

Founder of the Sautrāntika school of Buddhism

- Title: Founder of the Sautrāntika school of Buddhism

Personal life
- Born: 3rd century CE

Religious life
- Religion: Buddhism

Kumāralāta (3rd century) was an Indian founder of the Sautrāntika school of Buddhism.

== Biography ==
He was a native of Taxila. According to the Chinese sources, he moved to Kabandha, where the king of the country gave him a splendid monastery in an old palace. He was known all over the Buddhist world for his genius, great learning and abilities; he also had influence on the development of Japanese Buddhism. He was considered one of the "four Suns illuminating the world", other three being Aśvaghoṣa, Aryadeva and Nagarjuna.

== Works ==
The founding of the Sautrāntika school is attributed to the elder Kumāralāta (c. 3rd century CE), author of a "collection of dṛṣtānta" (Dṛṣtāntapaṅkti) called the Kalpanāmaṇḍitīkā. The Sautrāntikas were sometimes also called "disciples of Kumāralāta". According to the Chinese sources, Harivarman (250-350 CE) was a student of Kumāralāta who became disillusioned with Buddhist Abhidharma and then wrote the Tattvasiddhi-śāstra in order to "eliminate confusion and abandon the later developments, with the hope of returning to the origin". This writing then formed the basis of formation of Jōjitsu school of Japanese Buddhism.

Kumāralāta's work Kalpanāmaṇḍitikā Dṛṣṭāntapaṅkti (“Garland of Examples,” henceforth Kumāralāta's Garland) reflects an urgent statement of the core values of Buddhist urban businesspeople. According to Loukota Sanclemente and Diego, it emphasize both religious piety and the pursuit of wealth, a concern for social respectability, a strong work ethic, and an emphasis on rational decision-making. These values inform Kumāralāta's religious vision of poverty and wealth. His vision of religious giving conjugates economic behavior and religious doctrine, and the outcome is a model that confers religious legitimation to the pursuit of wealth but also an economic outlet for religious fervor and a solid financial basis for the monastic establishment, depicted by Kumāralāta in close interdependence with the laity and, most importantly, within the same social class.

== See also ==
- Majjhantika
- Sautrāntika
