= Arthaviniscaya Sutra =

The Arthaviniścaya Sūtra ("Gathering the Meanings" or "Analysis of the topics") is a Buddhist Abhidharma type work which shows Sautrāntika/Sarvāstivāda affiliation. It mostly consists of matrices or lists of key early Buddhist teachings such as the four satipatthanas and the stages of anapanasati.

A commentary was written on this text, by one Vīryaśrīdatta (770 CE), known as the Arthaviniścaya-sūtra-nibandhana. A separate commentary is preserved in Tibetan, the Artha-viniscaya-tika (author unknown, Tibetan Tanjur. PTT, vol. 145.)

Sanskrit, Tibetan and Chinese versions have survived. Tibetan version is titled དོན་རྣམ་པར་ངེས་པ་ཞེས་བྱ་བའི་ཆོས་ཀྱི་རྣམ་གྲངས་ and can be found in Kanjur (e.g. vol. 72 of Derge edition, text 17). The sūtra was also translated twice into Chinese, once by Faxian (法賢) in the tenth century, and later by Jin Zong Chi (金總持) in the eleventh century (Taishō 762 決定義經 and Taishō 763 法乘義決定經, respectively).

== Translations ==
- N. H. Samtani. The Arthaviniścaya-Sūtra, and its commentary, Nibandhana, written by Bhiksu Vīryaśridatta, Jayaswal Research Institute, 1971
- N. H. Samtani, Ānandajoti Bhikkhu. Artha-Viniścaya-Sūtram, The Discourse giving the Analysis of the Topics with additions, corrections and translation. (2016)

== See also ==
- Abhidharma
