= Aśvaghoṣa =

2nd century Buddhist Indian poet and philosopher

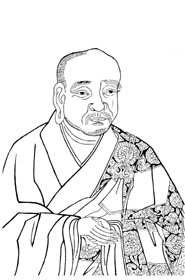
- Aśvaghoṣa as a Mahayana patriarch
- Occupations: Poet, dramatist, philosopher
- Writing career
- Language: Sanskrit
- Period: c. 1st / 2nd century CE
- Genres: Sanskrit drama, epic poetry, kāvya
- Subject: Sarvāstivāda or Mahāsāṃghika Buddhism
- Notable works: Buddhacharita, Saundarananda, Sutralankara

Aśvaghoṣa, also transliterated Ashvaghosha (Sanskrit: [ˌɐɕʋɐˈɡʱoːʂɐ], अश्वघोष; lit. "Horse-Cry"; Tibetan: སློབ་དཔོན་དཔའ་བོ།, Wylie: slob dpon dpa' bo; Chinese: 馬鳴菩薩; pinyin: Mǎmíng púsà; lit. 'Horse-Cry Bodhisattva') (c. 80 – c. 150 CE), was a Buddhist philosopher, dramatist, poet, musician, and orator from India. He was born in Saketa, today known as Ayodhya.

He is believed to have been the first Sanskrit dramatist, and is considered the greatest Indian poet prior to Kālidāsa. It seems probable that he was the contemporary and spiritual adviser of Kanishka in the first century of our era. He was the most famous in a group of Buddhist court writers, whose epics rivaled the contemporary Ramayana. Whereas much of Buddhist literature prior to the time of Aśvaghoṣa had been composed in Pāli and Prakrit, Aśvaghoṣa wrote in Classical Sanskrit. He may have been associated with the Sarvāstivāda or the Mahasanghika schools.

== Life ==
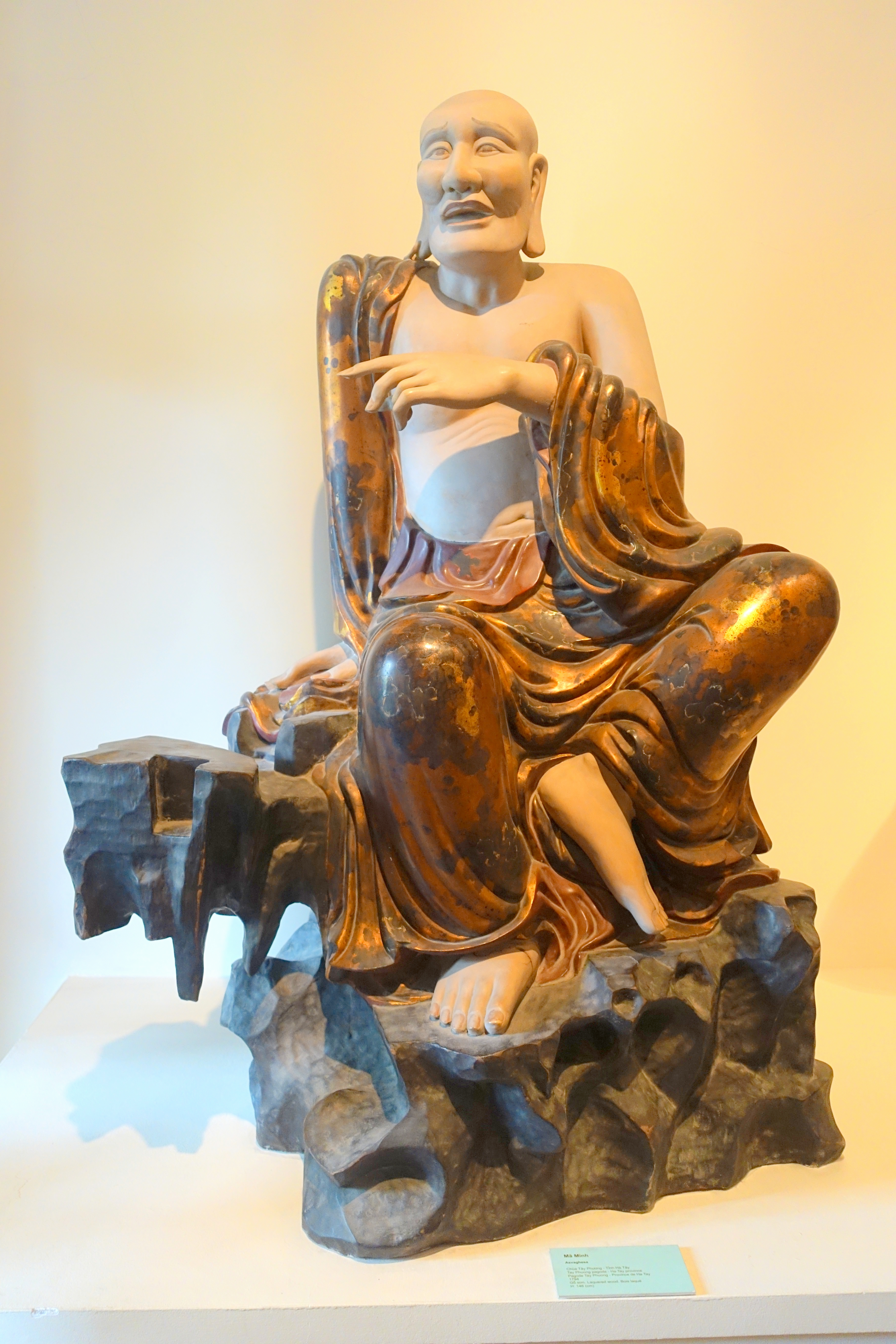
Aśvaghesa statue, Tây Phương Temple, Vietnam, 1794 CE

He is said to have been born in Ayodhya. His original (lay) name is unknown, Aśvaghosa being a later nickname only. According to the traditional biography of Aśvaghoṣa, which was translated into Chinese by Kumārajīva, and preserved in that language, he was originally a wandering ascetic who was able to defeat all-comers in debate. He set a challenge to the Buddhist monks that if none could meet with him in debate then they should stop beating the wood-block which signalled to the people to bring offerings to them. There was no one there to meet the challenge so they stopped beating the wood-block.

However, in the north there was an elder bhikṣu named Pārśva at the time, who saw that if he could convert this ascetic, it would be a great asset to the propagation of the Dharma, so he travelled from northern India and had the wood-block sounded. The ascetic came to ask why it had been sounded. Though thinking the old monk would be unable to debate with him, he accepted the challenge. After seven days, the debate was held in front of the King, his Ministers, and many ascetics and brahmans. The loser agreed to become the disciple of the other.

They agreed that the elder Pārśva should speak first, and he said: "The world should be made peaceable, with a long-lived king, plentiful harvests, and joy throughout the land, with none of the myriad calamities", to which the ascetic had no response and so was bound to become Pārśva's disciple, and he was given full ordination as a bhikṣu. Although he had to consent to this, he still was not convinced of the elder's virtues until he showed him he had mastered the Bases of Spiritual Power (r̥ddhipādāḥ), at which point he gained faith. Pārśva then taught him the 5 Faculties, the 5 Powers, the 7 Factors and the 8-fold Noble Path, and he eventually mastered the teaching.

Later, the central kingdom was besieged by the Kuṣāna king's army, who demanded 300,000 gold pieces in tribute. The King could not pay so much, as he had only 100,000. The Kuṣāna king therefore asked for the Buddha's begging bowl, the converted monk, and the 100,000 gold pieces for his tribute. Although the king of the central kingdom was unhappy, the monk persuaded him it would be for the good of the propagation of the Dharma which would spread across the four continents if he went with the Kuṣāna king. He was therefore taken away.

The Kuṣāna king's Ministers, however, were unhappy, not thinking that the bhikṣu was priced correctly at 100,000 gold pieces. The king, who knew the worth of a bhiksu, ordered that seven horses be starved for six days. The king then made an assembly and had the bhikṣu preach the Dharma. Even the horses, whose favourite food was placed in front of them, were entranced by the Teaching of the monk, and listened intently with tears in their eyes. Everybody was thereby convinced of his worth. And because the horses could understand his voice, he was given the name Aśvaghoṣa, Horse-Cry. In other sources, it is said that, at the time of his birth, an auspicious sign manifested in that all the horses in the country simultaneously let out their cries, and so he was given the name, Aśvaghoṣa.

Aśvaghoṣa travelled throughout northern India proclaiming the Dharma and guiding all through his wisdom and understanding, and he was held in great regard by the four-fold assembly, who knew him as The Sun of Merit and Virtue.

It is now believed that Aśvaghoṣa was not from the Mahayanist period, and seems to have been ordained into a subsect of the Mahasanghikas. Some recent research into his kavya poems have revealed that he may have used the Yogacarabhumi as a textual reference, particularly for the Saundarananda, which opens up the possibility he was affiliated with either the Yogacara or the Sautrantika school.

== Works ==
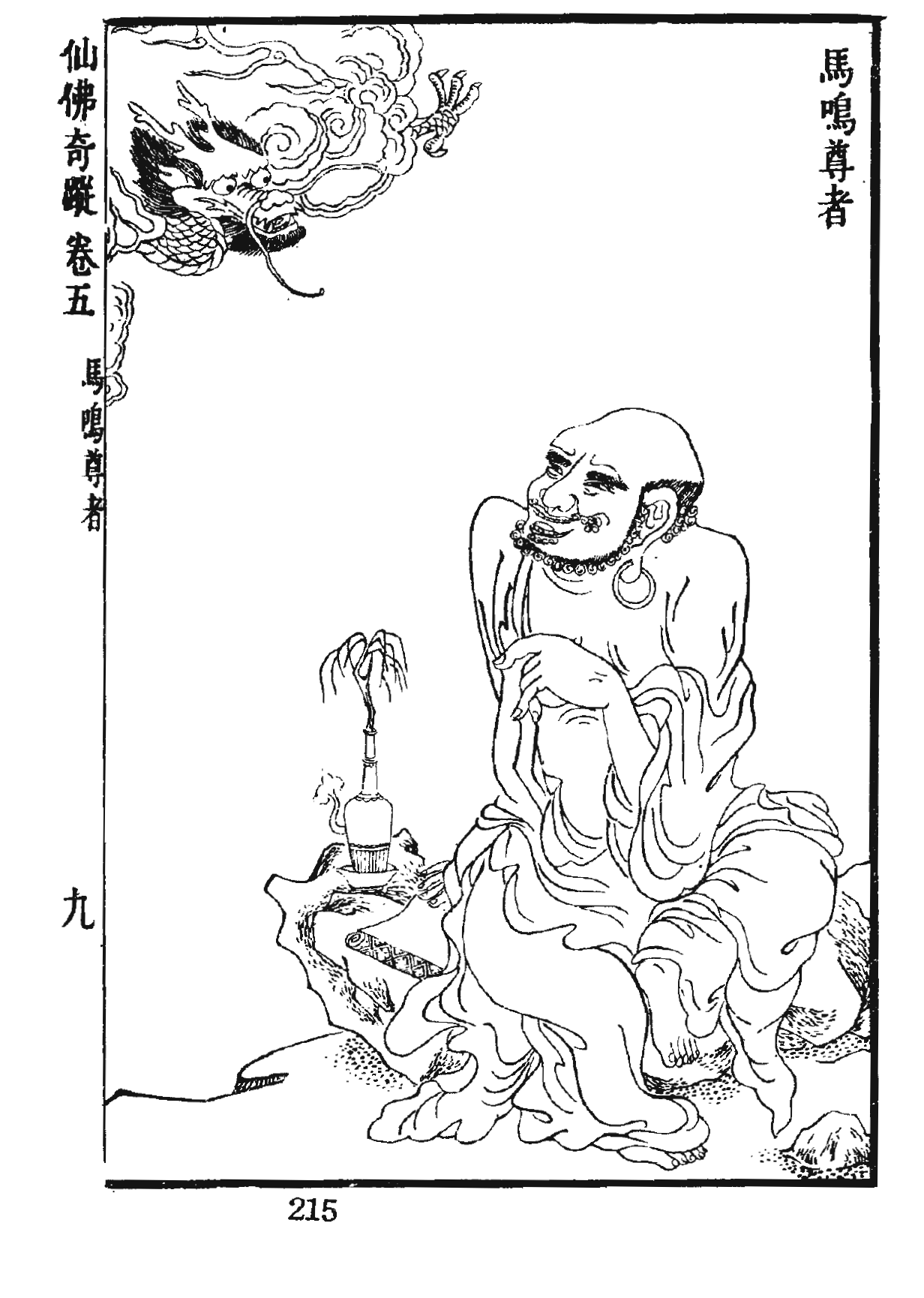
Aśvaghoṣa

Aśvaghoṣa wrote an epic life of the Buddha called Buddhacharita (Acts of the Buddha) in classical Sanskrit. The monk I-tsing (Yijing) mentioned that in his time Buddhacarita was "...extensively read in all the five parts of India and in the countries of the South Sea (Sumātra, Jāva and the neighbouring islands). He clothed manifold notions and ideas in a few words which so delighted the heart of his reader that he never wearied of perusing the poem. Moreover, it was regarded as a virtue to read it in as much as it contained the noble doctrine in a neat compact form."

He also wrote Saundarananda, a kāvya poem with the theme of conversion of Nanda, Buddha's half-brother, so that he might reach salvation. The first half of the work describes Nanda's life, and the second half of the work describes Buddhist doctrines and ascetic practices.

Aśvaghoṣa also wrote drama, and a fragment of his Śāriputraprakaraṇa has survived in Sanskrit.

=== Other attributed works ===
There are various works which have been attributed to Aśvaghoṣa which are of questionable authorship.

One of these works is the Tridaṇḍamālā (preserved in a single Sanskrit manuscript) which includes within it various passages from other Aśvaghoṣa works as well as the text of the Śokavinodana (attributed to Aśvaghoṣa).

Aśvaghoṣa has been claimed to be the author of the Sutralankara.

Aśvaghoṣa was previously believed to have been the author of the influential East Asian Buddhist text named The Awakening of Faith in the Mahayana (Chinese: 大乘起信論; pinyin: Dàshéng Qǐxìn Lùn), but modern scholars agree that the text was composed in China.

Another text ascribed to Aśvaghoṣa is Vajrasuchi, an extensive, beautifully written poetry that is critical of class and inequity imposed by Vedic religion. The relationship between the Vajrasuchi text of Buddhism and Vajrasuchi Upanishad of Hinduism has long been of interest to scholars. This interest among Western scholars began with Brian Houghton Hodgson – a colonial official based in Nepal who was loaned a Sanskrit text titled Vajra Suchi in 1829, by a Buddhist friend of his, whose contents turned out to be similar to the Vajrasuci Upanishad. In 1835, Hodgson published a translation. The first line of the Hodgson translation mentioned "Ashu Ghosa" and invoked "Manju Ghosa" as the Guru of the World. The details of the caste system, its antiquity and "shrewd and argumentative attack" by a Buddhist, in the words of Hodgson, gained wide interest among 19th-century scholars. The scholarship that followed, surmised that "Ashu Ghosa" is possibly the famous Buddhist scholar Aśvaghoṣa, who lived around the 2nd century CE.

== See also ==
- Sanskrit drama
- Sanskrit literature

== Bibliography ==
- Buswell, Robert E., ed. (2004). Encyclopedia of Buddhism. Macmillan Reference USA. p. 35. ISBN 0-02-865718-7.
