= Buddhacharita =

Poem

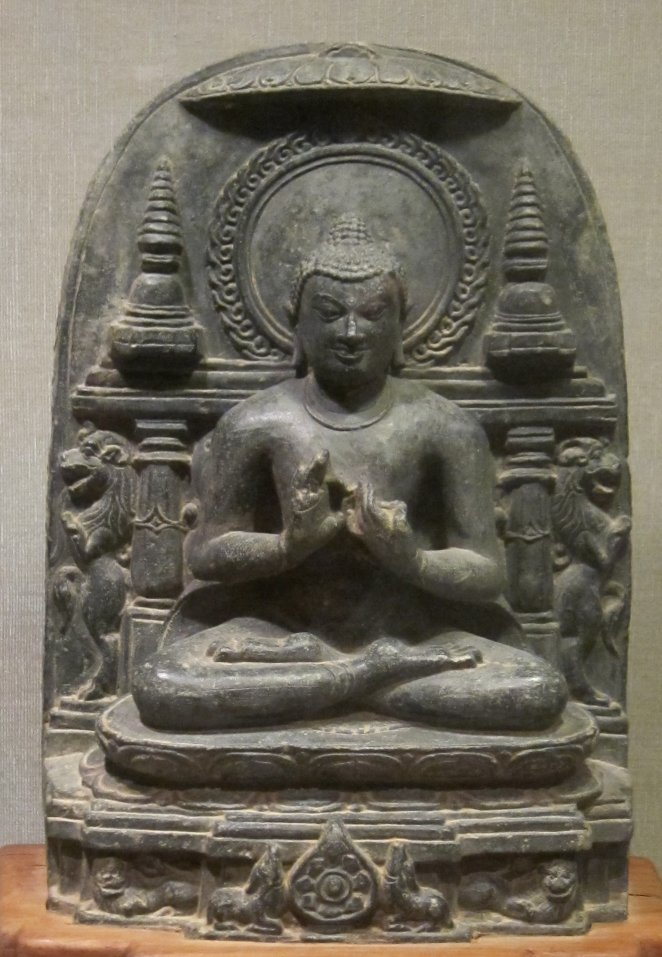
Buddha's First Sermon', India, 11th century

Buddhacharita (Sanskrit: बुद्धचरितम्, romanized: Buddhacaritam; transl. Acts of the Buddha) is an epic poem in the Sanskrit mahakavya style on the life of Gautama Buddha by Aśvaghoṣa of Sāketa (modern Ayodhya), composed in the early second century CE.

The author has prepared an account of the Buddha's life and teachings which, unlike other treatments such as Mahavastu (“Great Story”) and Lalitavistara (“Full Description of the Play [of the Buddha]”), is not only artistically arranged but also restrained in the description of the miracles of Gautam Buddha. His work also reflects a vast knowledge of Indian mythology and pre-Buddhist philosophy, as well as a court poet's interest in love, war, and statecraft.

Of the poem's 28 cantos, only the first 14 are extant in Sanskrit (cantos 15 to 28 are in incomplete form). But in Chinese (5th century) and Tibetan translations, all 28 chapters are preserved. In 420 AD, Dharmakṣema made a Chinese translation, and in the 7th or 8th century, a Tibetan version was composed by an unknown author which "appears to be much closer to the original Sanskrit than the Chinese."

== In Journey to the West ==
Wu Cheng-en's 1592 novel Journey to the West provides a fictitious explanation for the incomplete nature of the poem. During chapter 99, Tang Sanzang and the others are returning to China from India with 5,080 rolls of scripture. The Great White Turtle aids them in crossing the Heaven-Reaching river, but douses them in it after realising that Sanzang had failed to speak to the Buddha on his behalf. The group survive the ordeal, and lay out the scripture to dry on some rocks. Their copy of the Buddhacharita is torn when attempting to peel it off to continue their journey- leaving the lost part marked on the rock. Sun Wukong comments on how, now incomplete, the poem represents the imperfect nature of Heaven and earth:

After all, even Heaven and Earth are not perfect. This sutra may have been perfect, but a part of it has been tom off precisely because only in that condition will it correspond to the profound mystery of nonperfection. What happened isn't something human power could anticipate or change!

— Wu Cheng-en, translated by Anthony C. Yu

== English translations ==
- E.B. Cowell, trans. The Buddha Carita or the Life of the Buddha, Oxford, Clarendon 1894, reprint: New Delhi, 1977. PDF (14,8 MB)
- Samuel Beal, trans. The Fo-Sho-Hing-Tsan-King. Oxford, 1883. English translation of the Chinese version PDF (17,7 MB)
- E. H. Johnston, trans. The Buddhacarita or Acts of the Buddha. Lahore, 1936. 2 vols. (Cantos 1-14 in Sanskrit and English). Reprint: Delhi, Motilal Barnasidass 1978
- E. H. Johnston, trans. (1937), "The Buddha's Mission and last Journey: Buddhacarita, xv to xxviii", Acta Orientalia, 15: 26-62, 85-111, 231-292.
- Patrick Olivelle, trans. Life of the Buddha. Clay Sanskrit Library, 2008. 1 vols. (Cantos 1-14 in Sanskrit and English with summary of the Chinese cantos not available in the Sanskrit)
- Willemen, Charles, trans. (2009), Buddhacarita: In Praise of Buddha's Acts, Berkeley, Numata Center for Buddhist Translation and Research. ISBN 978-1886439-42-9

== Other Language Translations ==
- Iyothee Thass, Tamil Buddhist text in the form of long narrative called Buddharadhu Adhivedham, Madras, 1914.

Ayyathurai, Gajendran (2011). Foundations of Anti-caste Consciousness: Pandit Iyothee Thass, Tamil Buddhism, and the Marginalized in South India, Ph.D. Thesis, Columbia University, Department of Anthropology.

- Bhaskar Hanumath Kompella, Telugu Translation in the form of Tika (Word by Word meanings) and Tatparya (Substance). Buddha Charitam, Ajo-Vibho-Kandalam Publications, Hyderabad, 2018
- Bhavanath Jha. Buddha-charitam Restored into Sanskrit verses by Pt. Bhavanath Jha. (Contains a re-translation back into Sanskrit of the lost cantos). Mahavir Mandir Prakashan.

== See also ==
- Buddhavaṃsa
- Lalitavistara Sūtra
