= Tattvasiddhi Śāstra =

Indian Buddhist text

The Tattvasiddhi-Śāstra ("The Treatise that Accomplishes Reality"; Chinese: 成實論, Chengshilun; Japanese pronunciation: Jōjitsu-ron, also reconstructed as Satyasiddhi-Śāstra), is an Indian Abhidharma Buddhist text by a figure known as Harivarman (250–350).

It was translated into Chinese in 411 by Kumārajīva and this translation (Taishō number: T1646) is the only extant version, which became popular in China. This text was translated into English by N. Aiyaswami Sastri in 1978.

== Content ==
The Tattvasiddhi is preserved in sixteen fascicles in the Chinese with 202 chapters, it is organized according to the four noble truths.

I. Introduction (發聚) (chapters 1–35)

1. The three treasures of Buddhism (三寶) (1–12)
2. Introduction to the treatise and its content (13–18)
3. Ten points of controversy (19–35)

II. The truth of suffering (苦諦聚) (36–94)

1. Form (rūpa 色) (36–59)
2. Consciousness (vijñāna 識) (60–76)
3. Apperception (saṃjñā 想) (77)
4. Feeling (vedanā 受) (78–83)
5. Volitional formations (saṃskāra 行) (84–94)

III. The truth of origin (集諦聚) (95–140)

1. Karma (業) (95–120)
2. Defilements (煩惱 kleśa) (121–140)

IV. The truth of cessation (滅諦聚) (141–154)

V. The truth of the path (道諦聚) (155–202)

1. Concentration (定 samādhi) (155–188)
2. Insight (慧 prajñā) (189–202)

In the text Harivarman attacks the Sarvastivada school's doctrine of "all exists" and the Pudgalavada theory of person. The Tattvasiddhi includes the teaching of dharma-śūnyatā, the emptiness of phenomena. This text also mentions the existence of a Bodhisattva Piṭaka. A central teaching of the text is that dharmas have no substance or substratum, they appear real but they are "like bubbles or like a circle of fire seen when a rope torch is whirled around very quickly." Harivarman writes:

"All parts being analyzed again and again are reduced to atoms which again being broken become non-existent. All things culminate necessarily in the idea of Shunyata."

Another important argument covered in the text is on the relationship between mind or consciousness (citta) and mental factors (caitasikas). Harivarman argues against the common Abhidharma idea of "association" (samprayoga) which held that caitasikas and citta were separate elemental constituents of experience which "associate" or join. Instead, according to Lin, his view is that "'mental factors' are not actually things different from consciousness but are in their nature precisely consciousness manifested in different modes".

The Tattvasiddhi outlines a conception of the two truths doctrine, explaining conventional or nominal truth and ultimate truth.

The Tattvasiddhi also outlines the importance of a samadhi which is a "cause of knowledge of things as they are, which is the same as knowledge of Shunyata."

== Author and school affiliation ==
What little information exists about Harivarman is from Chinese sources which put him sometime between 250 and 350 CE. According to Xuanzang's biography, Harivarman was born a Brahmin, ordained with the Sarvāstivāda, and became a student of the Sarvāstivāda teacher Kumāralāta (possibly the same as the original teacher of Sautrantika) who taught him the "great Abhidharma of Kātyāyana (迦旃延) with thousands of gāthās" probably the Jñānaprasthāna. However Harivarman was unhappy with the Abhidharma teachings and spent years studying the sutras to find the source of the disputes of the different Abhidharma schools and afterward engaged in many debates with various Abhidharma teachers, becoming unpopular among them. Xuanzang says he later took up living among the Mahāsāṅghikas and wrote the Tattvasiddhi, while living in Pataliputra. The goal of this work was to “eliminate confusion and abandon the later developments, with the hope of returning to the origin.”

The school affiliation of the author and his text has been debated for hundreds of years, even the early Chinese sources disagree. Jizang (吉藏 549–623 CE) states that various Chinese teachers consider him as being either a Dharmaguptaka, a Sautrantika, a Dārṣṭāntika, an eclectic teacher, a Bahuśrutīya or a Mahayanist. Three monks, Zhiyi (531–597), Jizang and Jingying, labeled it a Hinayana school; it was Daoxuan (596–667) who first identified it as Sautrāntika.

The Japanese scholars Katsura Shōryu and Fukuhara Ryōgon, in analyzing the doctrinal content, maintain that Harivarman is closest to the Bahuśrutīya school. This is also the position of A.K. Warder. Kumārajīva's student Sengrui discovered Harivarman had refused the abhidharma schools' approach to Buddhism seven times in the text, suggesting a strong sectarian division between them and the Sautrāntikas.

Qian Lin notes the difficulty of using doctrinal analysis to pin down a specific school affiliation due to the fluidity of said schools and the terms used to refer to them. He cautiously places him among the Dārṣṭāntika-Sautrāntika.

== Chinese sect ==
The Chengshi school (Chinese: 成實宗; pinyin: Chéngshí zōng; Japanese pronunciation: Jōjitsu-shū) was a sect based on the Tattvasiddhi which was influential but short-lived in India and had a brief continuation in China and the Asuka and Nara periods of Japan.

The Tattvasiddhi was initially promoted by three of Kumarajiva's students, Sengrui (僧叡 or 僧睿, c. 4th–5th c. CE), Sengdao (僧導 362–457 CE) and Sengsong (僧嵩 date unknown). Sengdao wrote a commentary on the text and his lineage was centered in Shouchun while the lineage of Sengson was centered in Pengcheng.

Other major expounders of the Tattvasiddhi in China include the group named "Three Great Masters of the Liang dynasty": Sengmin (僧旻, 467–527), Zhizang (智蔵) (458–522) and Fayun (法雲, 467–529), who initially interpreted the sect as Mahayana in outlook. The three of them in turn received instructions in this treatise from the monk Huici (慧次, 434–490). The three of them also possibly influenced the writing of the Sangyō Gisho, a sutra commentary supposedly authored by Prince Shōtoku.

The tradition of the Tattvasiddhi remained strong up until the Tang dynasty, up to 24 commentaries were written on the text, all of which are now lost. The Madhyamaka teacher Jizang (549–623) strongly criticized the work as "Hinayana" (lesser vehicle) and possibly due to the rise of new more influential schools such as the Huayan and Tiantai schools, the Chinese tradition of the Tattvasiddhi died out.

=== Japan ===
It was introduced to Japan as Jōjitsu in 625 by the monk Hyegwan of Goryeo. In Japan, it was classified as one of the three approaches of East Asian Mādhyamaka instead of a separate lineage. East Asian Mādhyamaka (三論宗, Sanron-shū) was one of the six Nara sects (南都六宗, Nanto Rokushū).

== See also ==
- Sautrāntika
- Bahuśrutīya
- Sarvastivada
