= Franklin Edgerton =

American linguist (1885–1963)

- Born: July 24, 1885; Le Mars, Iowa, U.S.
- Died: December 7, 1963 (aged 78); Laramie, Wyoming, U.S.
- Spouse: Unnamed woman (div. 1952) Eleanor Hill (m. 1952)
- Children: 1

Academic background
- Education: Johns Hopkins University
- Thesis: The k-suffixes of Indo-Iranian, Part I: The k-suffixes in the Veda and Avesta (1909)

Academic work
- Institutions: Yale University; Benares Hindu University; University of Pennsylvania
- Notable ideas: Edgerton's converse

Franklin Edgerton (July 24, 1885 – December 7, 1963) was an American linguist and Indologist. He was Salisbury Professor of Sanskrit and Comparative Philology at Yale University (1926) and visiting professor at Benares Hindu University (1953–4). Between 1913 and 1926, he was the Professor of Sanskrit at the University of Pennsylvania.

Edgerton is remembered for his notably literal translation of the Bhagavad Gita which was published as volume 38–39 of the Harvard Oriental Series in 1944. He also edited the parallel edition of four recensions of the Simhāsana Dvātrṃśika ("32 Tales of the Throne", also known as Vikrama Charita: "Adventures of Vikrama"), and a reconstruction of the (lost) original Sanskrit text of the Panchatantra.

Edgerton was elected to the American Academy of Arts and Sciences in 1920, the American Philosophical Society in 1935. He died in Laramie, Wyoming, on December 7, 1963, after sustaining injuries during a fall.

== Publications ==
- Edgerton, Franklin (1924). Panchatantra reconstructed. 2 Volumes. New Haven, CT: American Oriental Society. Volume 1: Text, Volume 2: Translation
- Edgerton, Franklin (1926). Vikrama's Adventures. Harvard Oriental Series, Volumes 26 & 27. Cambridge, MA: Harvard University Press. Part 1: Translations, Part 2: Texts
- Edgerton, Franklin (1931) The elephant-lore of the Hindus. Yale University Press.
- Edgerton, Franklin (1944) The Bhagavad Gita, Translated and interpreted from the Sanskrit, Harvard University Press: Cambridge, Mass.
- Edgerton, Franklin (1953). Buddhist hybrid sanskrit grammar and dictionary, Vol. 1: Grammar. New Haven: Yale University Press
- Edgerton, Franklin (1953). Buddhist hybrid sanskrit grammar and dictionary, Vol. 2: Dictionary. New Haven: Yale University Press
- Edgerton, Franklin (1965). The Beginnings of Indian Philosophy: Selections from the Rig Veda, Atharva Veda, Upanisads, and Mahabharata, Translated from the Sanskrit with an Introduction, notes, and glossarial index. Harvard University Press & George Allen & Unwin London
