= Sautrāntika =

Early Buddhist school

The Sautrāntika or Sūtravāda (Sanskrit: सौत्रान्तिक, Suttavāda in Pali; Chinese: 經量部\ 說經部; pinyin: Jīng liàng bù, Shuō jīng bù; Vietnamese: Kinh lượng bộ, Thuyết chuyển bộ; Japanese: 経量部, romanized: Kyōryōbu) was an early Buddhist school generally believed to be descended from the Sthavira Nikāya by way of their immediate parent school, the Sarvāstivādins. While they are identified as a unique doctrinal tendency, they were part of the Sarvāstivāda Vinaya lineage of monastic ordination.

Their name means literally "the conclusions of the sūtras" where sūtra is lengthened into the vṛddhi derivative sautra, and combined with the word anta, meaning end or conclusion, with a final nominal marker ika (compare with the term Vedānta), meaning their philosophy is derived from the sūtras. As stated by the commentator Yasomitra, they hold the sūtras, but not the Abhidharma commentaries (śāstras), as authoritative. The views of this group first appear in the Abhidharmakośabhāṣya of Vasubandhu.

== Name ==
The name Sautrāntika indicates that unlike other North Indian Sthaviras, this school held the Buddhist sūtras as central to their views, over and above the ideas presented in the Abhidharma literature. The Sarvastivāda scholar Saṃghabhadra, in his Nyāyānusāra, attacks a school of thought named Sautrantika which he associates with the scholars Śrīlāta and his student Vasubandhu. According to Saṃghabhadra, a central tenet of this school was that all sūtra is explicit meaning (nitartha), hence their name.

The Sarvāstivādins sometimes referred to them as the Dārṣṭāntika school, meaning "those who utilise the method of examples." This latter name may have been a pejorative label. It is also possible that the name "Dārṣṭāntika" identifies a predecessor tradition, or another related, but distinct, doctrinal position; the exact relationship between the two terms is unclear. Charles Willemen identifies the Sautrāntika as a western branch of the Sarvāstivādins, active in the Gandhara area, who split from the Sarvāstivādins sometime before 200 CE, when the Sautrāntika name emerged. Other scholars are less confident of a specific identification for the Sautrāntika; Nobuyoshi Yamabe calls specifying the precise identity of the Sautrāntika "one of the biggest problems in current Buddhist scholarship".

== History ==
The founding of the Sautrāntika school is attributed to the elder Kumāralāta (c. 3rd century CE), author of a "collection of dṛṣtānta" (Dṛṣtāntapaṅkti) called the Kalpanāmaṇḍitīkā. The Sautrāntikas were sometimes also called "disciples of Kumāralāta". According to Chinese sources, Harivarman (250–350 CE) was a student of Kumāralāta who became disillusioned with Buddhist Abhidharma and then wrote the Tattvasiddhi-śāstra in order to "eliminate confusion and abandon the later developments, with the hope of returning to the origin." The Tattvasiddhi was translated into Chinese and became an important text in Chinese Buddhism until the Tang Dynasty.

Other works by Sautrāntika affiliated authors include the Abhidharmāmṛtarasa-śāstra attributed to Ghoṣaka, and the Abhidharmāvatāra-śāstra attributed to Skandhila. The elder Śrīlāta, who was Vasubandhu's teacher is also known as a famous Sautrāntika who wrote the Sautrāntika-vibhāṣa. Ghoṣaka's Abhidharmāmṛtarasa and Harivarman's Tattvasiddhi have both been translated into English.

The Buddhist philosopher Vasubandhu wrote the famous Abhidharma work Abhidharmakośakārikā which presented Sarvāstivāda-Vaibhāṣika Abhidharma tenets, he also wrote a "bhāṣya" or commentary on this work, which presented critiques of the Vaibhāṣika tradition from a Sautrāntika perspective. The Abhidharmakośa was highly influential and is the main text on Abhidharma used in Tibetan and Chinese Buddhism up until today.

Buddhist logic (pramāṇavāda) as developed by Dignāga and Dharmakīrti is also associated with the Sautrāntika school.

== Doctrine ==
No separate Vinaya (monastic code) specific to the Sautrāntika has been found, nor is the existence of any such separate disciplinary code evidenced in other texts; this indicates that they were likely only a doctrinal division within the Sarvāstivādin school.

The Sautrāntika criticised the Sarvāstivādins on various matters such as ontology, philosophy of mind and perception. While the Sarvāstivādin Abhidharma described a complex system in which past, present, and future phenomena are all held to have some form of their own existence, the Sautrāntika subscribed to a doctrine of "extreme momentariness" that held that only the present moment existed. They seem to have regarded the Sarvāstivādin position as a violation of the basic Buddhist principle of impermanence. As explained by Jan Westerhoff, this doctrine of momentariness holds that each present moment "does not possess any temporal thickness; immediately after coming into existence each moment passes out of existence" and that therefore "all dharmas, whether mental or material, only last for an instant (kṣaṇa) and cease immediately after arising."

The Sarvāstivādin Abhidharma also broke down human experience in terms of a variety of underlying phenomena (a view similar to that held by the modern Theravādin Abhidhamma); the Sautrāntika believed that experience could not be differentiated in this manner.

Sautrantika doctrines expounded by elder Śrīlāta and critiqued in turn by Saṃghabhadra's Nyayanusara include:

- The theory of anudhatu (or *purvanudhatu, "subsidiary element"), which is also associated with the theory of seeds (bīja) espoused by Vasubandhu. This theory was used to explain karma and rebirth.
- The doctrine that ćaitasikas (mental factors) are but modes of ćitta (mind) and are not separate elemental dharmas which come together in "association" (samprayoga) as the Vaibhāṣika believed. This view is also expoused at length in Harivarman's Tattvasiddhi.
- The doctrine that the sense-elements (dhatu) alone are real existents, not the aggregates (skandha) or sense spheres (āyatana).
- An interpretation of perception (pratyaksha) which differed from the direct realism of the Vaibhāṣika, and instead posited a form of indirect representationalism.

According to Vasubandhu, the Sautrāntika also held the view that there may be many Buddhas simultaneously, otherwise known as the doctrine of contemporaneous Buddhas.

== See also ==
- Schools of Buddhism
- Nikāya Buddhism
