= List of ancient Indian writers =

The following is a list of ancient Indian writers, originating from the Indian subcontinent. Many writers contributed to the large body of early Indian literature (here roughly taken to predate the 13th century Delhi Sultanate), consisting of poetry, drama, and writings on religion, philosophy, linguistics, mathematics and many other topics.

== Literature ==
| Writer | Works |
|---|---|
| Abhinavagupta | Tantraloka, |
| Adi Shankara | Vivekachudamani, Aparoksanubhuti, Atma Shatakam, Manisha Panchakam, more.. |
| Agattiyar | Agattiyam |
| Amara Simha | Amarakosha |
| Andal | Tiruppavai, Nachir Tirumozhi |
| Akṣapāda Gautama | Nyāya Sūtras |
| Anandavardhana | Dhvanyaloka |
| Ashtavakra | Ashtavakra Gita |
| Aśvaghoṣa | Buddhacarita |
| Avvaiyar | Purananuru |
| Badarayana | Brahma Sutras |
| Bāṇabhaṭṭa | Harshacharita, Kadambari |
| Bharata Muni | Natya Shastra |
| Bharavi | Kirātārjunīya |
| Bhartṛhari | Vākyapadīya, Śatakatraya |
| Bhavabhuti | Mahaviracharita, Malatimadhava, Uttararamacharita |
| Bhāsa | Svapnavasavadatta, Urubhanga, Pratima-nataka, Abhisheka-natka, Pancharatra, Madhyamavyayoga, Duta-Ghattotkacha, Duta-Vakya, Karna-bhara, Harivamsa (Bala-charita), Pratijna Yaugandharayaanam |
| Bilhana | Vikramankadevacharita, Caurapâñcâśikâ |
| Chanakya | Arthashastra, Neetishastra |
| Daṇḍin | Daśakumāracarita, Kavyadarsha |
| Dhanayala | Bhavisayatta Kaha |
| Gunadhya | Bṛhat-Katha |
| Hāla | Gaha Sattasai |
| Harsha Vardhana | Ratnavali, Nagananda, Priyadarsika |
| Ilango Adigal | Silappatikaram |
| Jaimini | Purva Mimamsa Sutras, Jaimini Bharata, Jaimini Sutras |
| Jayadeva | Gita Govinda |
| Kalhana | Rajatarangini |
| Kālidāsa | Abhijñānaśākuntalam, Meghadūta, Raghuvaṃśa, Kumārasambhava, Vikramōrvaśīyam, Mālavikāgnimitram, Ṛtusaṃhāra |
| Kambar | Kambaramayanam, Erezhupathu, Silaiezhupathu, Kangai Puranam, Sarasvati Anthati |
| Kshemendra | Brihat-Katha-Manjari, Ramayana-manjari |
| Kundakunda | Samayasāra, Niyamasara, Pancastikayasara, Pravacanasara, Atthapahuda, Barasanuvekkha |
| Nagakuthanaar | Kundalakesi |
| Kuntaka | Vakroktijivita |
| Lagadha | Vedanga Jyotisha |
| Magha | Shishupala Vadha |
| Mahendravarman I | Mattavilasa Prahasana, Bhagavadajjuka |
| Mahidasa Aitareya | Aitareya Brahmana |
| Mammata Bhatta | Kâvyaprakâsha |
| Matanga Muni | Brihaddeshi |
| Nagarjuna | Mūlamadhyamakakārikā, Śūnyatāsaptati, Vigrahavyāvartanī, Vaidalyaprakaraṇa, Vyavahārasiddhi, Yuktiṣāṣṭika, Catuḥstava, Ratnāvalī, Pratītyasamutpādahṝdayakārika, Sūtrasamuccaya, Bodhicittavivaraṇa, Suhṛllekha, Bodhisaṃbhāra |
| Nandikeshvara | Abhinaya Darpana, Bharatarnava |
| Padmagupta | Navasahasānkacharitam |
| Rajasekhara | Viddhasalabhañjika, Balabharata, Karpuramañjari, Bālarāmāyaṇa, Kāvyamīmāṃsā |
| Rati Ram Sahib | Bhagvad Gita |
| Siddhasena Divakara | Nyāyāvatāra, Sanmatisūtra |
| Sīthalai Sāttanār | Manimekalai |
| Somadeva | Kathasaritsagara |
| Sphujidhvaja | Yavanajataka |
| Sriharsha | Naishadhīya-charitam |
| Śūdraka | Mricchakatika |
| Thiruvalluvar | Thirukkural |
| Tirutakkatevar | Civaka Cintamani |
| Umaswati | Tattvartha Sutra |
| Valmiki | Ramayana, Yoga Vasistha |
| Vallabhacharyajee | Shree Subodhiniji, Shodash Granth, Anubhashya, Gayatri Bhashya and much more... |
| Vātsyāyana | Nyāya Sutra Bhāshya, Kama Sutra |
| Vijñāneśvara | Mitākṣarā |
| Vilambi Naganaar | Nanmanikadigai |
| Vishakhadatta | Mudrarakshasa, Devichandraguptam |
| Vishnu Sharma | Panchatantra |
| Vyasa | Mahabharata |
| Yajnavalkya | Shatapatha Brahmana, Yoga Yajnavalkya, Yājñavalkya Smṛti |

== Grammar ==
| Writer | Works |
|---|---|
| Apastamba | Dharmasutra |
| Kātyāyana | Varttika |
| Pānini | Ashtadhyayi |
| Patañjali | Mahabhasya, Yoga Sūtras |
| Pingala | Chandaḥśāstra |
| Śākaṭāyana | Lakṣaṇa Śāstra |
| Shaunaka | Ṛgveda-Prātiśākhya, Bṛhaddevatā, Caraṇa-vyūha, six Anukramaṇīs (indices) to the Rigveda |
| Vararuchi | Prākṛt Prakāśa |
| Yāska | Nirukta |

== Astrology ==
| Writer | Works |
|---|---|
| Kalyāṇavarman | Sārāvalī |
| Parashara | Bṛhat Parāśara Horāśāstra |

== Medicine ==
| Writer | Works |
|---|---|
| Charaka | Charaka Samhita |
| Kashyap | Kashyap Samhita |
| Madhav | Nidāna |
| Sushruta | Sushruta Samhita |
| Vagbhata | Ashtanga Sangraha, Ashtanga Hridaya Samhita |

== Mathematics ==
| Writer | Works |
|---|---|
| Aryabhata | Āryabhaṭīya, Arya-siddhanta |
| Baudhayana | Shulba Sutras, Shrauta Sutra, Dharmasūtra |
| Bhāskara I | Āryabhaṭīyabhāṣya, Mahābhāskarīya, Laghubhāskarīya |
| Bhāskara II | Siddhānta Shiromani (four volumes: Lilāvati, Bijaganita, Grahaganita and Golādhyāya) |
| Brahmagupta | Brāhmasphuṭasiddhānta |
| Halayudha | Mṛtasañjīvanī |
| Mahāvīra (mathematician) | Ganit Saar Sangraha |
| Parameshvara | Bhatadipika, Karmadipika, Paramesvari, Sidhantadipika, Vivarana, Drgganita, Goladipika, Grahanamandana, Grahanavyakhyadipika, Vakyakarana |
| Varāhamihira | Pancha-Siddhantika, Brihat-Samhita, Brihat Jataka, Daivaigya Vallabha, Laghu Jataka, Yoga Yatra, Vivaha Patal |
| Virasena | Dhavala |
| Baudhayana Rishi | Baudhayana Sutras, Baudhāyana Sulbasūtra, Baudhāyana Dharmasūtra |

== See also ==
- List of historic Indian texts
- Indian literature
