= Alankara Shastra =

Indic philosophy of aesthetics

The Alankara Shastra is the traditional Indian science of aesthetics that deals with the principles and techniques of literary composition and ornamentation. It is an important aspect of Indian literary criticism and aims to enhance the beauty and expressiveness of literary works. It is based on the concept that literary works should be pleasing and enjoyable to the reader, and it provides guidelines for the use of literary devices such as metaphor, simile and imagery, as well as rules for the arrangement of words and phrases to create pleasing and harmonious compositions.

It also covers the use of various poetic meters and structural rules for different types of literature, such as epic poetry, drama, and lyrical poetry. The Shastra is considered an important part of Indian literary tradition and is still studied and applied in contemporary Indian literature and poetry.

The Sanskrit language and its corresponding literature have become an integral component of Indian religion and Indian Culture. From the earliest recorded specimens of Sanskrit literature, it is evident that the art of elegant speech was highly valued. Many hymns from the Rgveda are regarded as exemplary examples of superior poetry. The utilization of various rhetorical devices, which are employed in a natural and fluid manner, are highlighted as follows;

- Upamā - simile
- Rupaka - metaphor
- Atiśayokti - hyperbole

The Rāmāyana and the Mahābhārata are not only monumental works of combining wisdom and imagination with history, but they also demonstrate exceptional poetic skill. The formal study of Alankara Sastra as a distinct and independent subject did not exist in ancient times. The earliest systematization of this field is believed to have begun with the Nātya śāstra of Bharata, which was written between 200 B.C. and 400 A.D. Although it primarily focused on drama, it laid the foundation for the study of poetry as a science. Many poets have contributed to the literary tradition by producing high-quality works, enriching the field of poetry. These poets include,

- Bhāmaha and Daṇḍin (6th century AD)
- Vāmana and Udbhaṭa (8th century AD)
- Rudraṭa and Anandavardhana (9th century AD)
- Abhinavagupta, Kṣemendra and Mammata (11th century AD)

== Notable works ==
Some of the standard works of Alankara Sastra are Bharata's Nātyaśāstra, Bhāmaha's Kāvyālañkāra, Daṇḍin's Kāvyādarśa, Udbhaṭa's Kāvyālañkāra-sañgraha, Rudraṭa's Kāvyālañkāra, Anandavardhana's Dhvanyāloka, and Mammata's Kāvya-prakāśa. These texts provide a comprehensive understanding of the principles and techniques of literary composition and ornamentation and are considered important references for anyone studying Indian aesthetics and literary criticism. They offer insight into various literary devices, structural rules and guidelines for the use of literary devices such as metaphor, simile, and imagery. These works are considered to be some of the most important contributions to the field of Alankara.

== See also ==
- Alankāra
- Bitextual work
- Natya Shastra
- Antahkarana
