= Bhaṭṭikāvya =

One of 7 epic Sanskrit poems

Bhaṭṭikāvya (Sanskrit: [bʱɐʈʈɪˈkaːʋjɐ]; "Bhatti's Poem") is a Sanskrit-language poem dating from the 7th century CE, in the formal genre of the "great poem" (mahākāvya). It focuses on two deeply rooted Sanskrit traditions, the Ramayana and Panini's grammar, while incorporating numerous other traditions, in a rich mix of science and art, poetically retelling the adventures of Rama and a compendium of examples of grammar and rhetoric. As literature, it is often considered to withstand comparison with the best of Sanskrit poetry.

The Bhaṭṭikāvya also has Rāvaṇavadha ("The Death of Rāvaṇa") as an alternative title. It is improbable that this was the original title as Ravana's death is only one short episode in the whole poem. It may have acquired this title to distinguish it from other works concerning themselves with the deeds of Rāma.

The poem is the earliest example of an "instructional poem" or śāstra-kāvya. That is, not a treatise written in verse but an imaginative piece of literature which is also intended to be instructive in specific subjects. To modern tastes, however, this can create an unpardonable artificiality in the composition. To the critics of late classical times in India technical virtuosity was much admired. Much of the Bhaṭṭikāvya's popular success could also be ascribed to the fact that it must have been useful as a textbook.

== The author ==
The author, Bhaṭṭi, describes himself at the end of the book:

"I composed this poem in Valabhi which is protected by Narendra, son of Shri-dhara, hence may the fame of that king increase, since the king causes joy among his subjects." (Bhaṭṭikāvya 22.35)

Even this eulogy is unreliable since variant readings of the verse show that his patron may have been Śrī Dharasena. Either way, the composition of the poem is placed at about 600 CE.

== The form of the poem ==
In form the Bhaṭṭikāvya is a “great poem” (mahākāvya). It fits well within the definition of this genre given later by Daṇḍin in his “Mirror of Poetry” the Kāvyādarśa:

It springs from a historical incident or is otherwise based on some fact; it turns upon the fruition of the fourfold ends and its hero is clever and noble; By descriptions of cities, oceans, mountains, seasons and risings of the moon or the sun; through sportings in garden or water, and festivities of drinking and love; Through sentiments-of-love-in-separation and through marriages, by descriptions of the birth-and-rise of princes, and likewise through state-counsel, embassy, advance, battle, and the hero’s triumph; Embellished; not too condensed, and pervaded all through with poetic sentiments and emotions; with cantos none too lengthy and having agreeable metres and well-formed joints, And in each case furnished with an ending in a different metre—such a poem possessing good figures-of-speech wins the people’s heart and endures longer than even a kalpa.
Daṇḍin's Kāvyādarśa 1.15–19 trans. Belvalkar.

itihāsa-kath’’-ôdbhūtam, itarad vā sad-āśrayam, | catur-varga-phal’-āyattaṃ, catur-udātta-nāyakam,
nagar’-ârṇava-śaila’-rtu, | udyāna-salila-kṛīḍā-madhu-pāna-rat’-ôtsavaiḥ,
vipralambhair vivāhaiś ca, kumār’-ôdaya-varṇanaiḥ, | mantra-dūta-prayāṇ’-āji-nāyak’-âbhyudayair api;
alaṃ-kṛtam, a-saṃkṣiptaṃ, rasa-bhāva-nirantaram, | sargair an-ativistīrṇaiḥ, śravya-vṛttaiḥ su-saṃdhibhiḥ,
sarvatra bhinna-vṛttāntair upetaṃ, loka-rañjanam | kāvyaṃ kalp’-ântara-sthāyi jāyate sad-alaṃkṛti. ||
Kāvyādarśa 1.15–19

Its subject matter is the life of a hero who is at once a human soldier yet divine. Each canto has a uniform metre and there is one canto (canto 10) deploying a variety of metres. The end of each canto suggests the topic for the next. The main sentiment or rasa of the poem is “heroism”, (vīrya). The poem through its form and subject matter is conducive to the attainment of the four aims of human life (puruṣārtha): “righteousness” (dharma), “wealth and power,” (artha), “pleasure” (kāma) and “spiritual liberation” (mokṣa). Bhaṭṭi’s Poem contains descriptions of cities, the ocean, mountains, seasons, the rising and setting of the sun and moon, and the sports of love and sex. Five such poems are traditionally enumerated in addition to which our work is sometimes named the sixth. The five are the Raghuvaṃśa (“Lineage of Raghu”) and the Kumārasambhava (“Birth of the war God KumAra/KartikEya/Muruga”) of Kālidāsa, the Śiśupālavadha (“Slaying of Śiśupāla”) of Māgha, Kirātārjunīya (“Arjuna and the Mountain Man”) of Bharavi and the Naiṣadhacarita (“Adventures of the Prince of Nishadha”) of Śrīharṣa. The multitude of manuscripts found in libraries demonstrates the popularity of the Bhaṭṭikāvya and the thirteen extant and eight further attested commentaries instantiate its importance to the tradition.

== Purpose and content ==
“Bhaṭṭi’s Poem” has two purposes: it is both a poetic retelling of the adventures of Rāma and a compendium of examples of grammar and rhetoric for the student. As literature, cantos 1, 2 and 10 in particular stand comparison with the best of Sanskrit poetry. The Bhaṭṭikāvya provides an exemplification of Sanskrit grammar in use and an introduction to the science (śāstra) of poetics or rhetoric (alaṃkāra, lit. ornament). It also gives a taste of the Prakrit language (a major component in every Sanskrit drama) in easily accessible form. Finally it tells the compelling story of Prince Rāma in simple, Sanskrit: this is the Rāmāyaṇa retold.

== The Bhaṭṭikāvya and Pāṇini’s Aṣṭādhyāyī, 'Eight Books' ==
The learned Indian curriculum in late classical times had at its heart a system of grammatical study and linguistic analysis. The core texts for this study were the notoriously difficult “Eight Chapters” (Aṣṭādhyāyī) of Pāṇini, the sine qua non of learning composed in the 4th century BCE, and arguably the most remarkable and foundational text in the history of linguistics. Not only is the Aṣṭādhyāyī a description of a language unmatched in totality for any language until the nineteenth century, but it is also presented in the most compact form possible through the use of an elaborate and sophisticated metalanguage, again unknown anywhere else in linguistics before modern times. This grammar of Pāṇini had been the object of intense study for the ten centuries prior to the composition of “Bhaṭṭi’s Poem”. It was Bhaṭṭi’s purpose to provide a study aid to Pāṇini’s text by using the examples already provided in the existing grammatical commentaries in the context of the gripping and morally improving story of the Rāmāyaṇa. The same could be said for poetics, prosody and Prakrit. The intention of the author was to teach these advanced sciences through a relatively easy and pleasant medium. In his own words:

This composition is like a lamp to those whose those who perceive the meaning of words and like a hand mirror for a blind man to those without grammar. This poem, which is to be understood by means of a commentary, is a joy to those sufficiently learned: through my fondness for the scholar I have here slighted the dullard.
Bhaṭṭikāvya 22.33–34.

The traditional story given to account for the technical or shastric nature of the poem goes that Bhaṭṭi’s class on grammar was one day disturbed by an elephant ambling between him and his pupils. This bestial interruption necessitated an interdiction of study for a year as prescribed by the solemn law books. To ensure that no vital study time was lost our poem was composed as a means of teaching grammar without resorting to an actual grammatical text.

== The Structure of the Text ==
=== The Bhaṭṭikāvya as a pedagogic text ===
Bhaṭṭikāvya canto and verse	Pāṇini sūtra	Topic
==== Prakīrṇa Khaṇḍa “Diverse Rules” ====
1.1-5.96	n/a	Miscellaneous sutras
==== Adhikāra Khaṇḍa "The Illustration of Particular Topics" ====
5.97-100	3.2.17-23	The affix Ṭa
5.104-6.4	3.1.35-41	The suffix ām in the periphrastic perfect
6.8-10	1.4.51	Double accusatives
6.16-34	3.1.43-66	Aorists using sĪC substitutes for the affix CLI
6.35-39	3.1.78	The affix ŚnaM for the present tense system of class 7 verbs
6.46-67	3.1.96-132	The future passive participles or gerundives and related forms formed from the kṛtya affixes tavya, tavyaT, anīyaR, yaT, Kyap, and ṆyaT
6.71-86	3.1.133-150	Words formed with nirupapada kṛt affixes ṆvuL, tṛC, Lyu, ṆinI, aC, Ka, Śa, Ṇa, ṢvuN, thakaN, ṆyuṬ and vuN
6.87-93	3.2.1-15	Words formed with sopapada kṛt affixes aṆ, Ka, ṬaK, aC
6.94-111	3.2.28-50	Words formed with affixes KHaŚ and KhaC
6.112-143	3.2.51-116	Words formed with kṛt affixes
7.1-25	3.2.134-175	kṛt (tācchīlaka) affixes tṛN, iṣṇuC, Ksnu, Knu, GHinUṆ, vuÑ, yuC, ukaÑ, ṢākaN, inI, luC, KmaraC, GhuraC, KuraC, KvaraP, ūka, ra, u, najIṄ, āru, Kru, KlukaN, varaC and KvIP
7.28-34	3.3.1-21	niradhikāra kṛt affixes
7.34-85	3.3.18-128	The affix GhaÑ
7.91-107	1.2.1-26	Ṅit-Kit
8.1-69	1.3.12-93	Ātmanepada (middle voice) affixes
8.70-84	1.4.24-54	The use of cases under the adhikāra ‘kārake’
8.85-93	1.4.83-98	karmapravacanīya prepositions
8.94-130	2.3.1-73	vibhakti, case inflection
9.8-11	7.2.1-7	The suffix sIC and vṛddhi of the parasmaipada aorist
9.12-22	7.2.8-30	The prohibition of iṬ
9.23-57	7.2.35-78	The use if iṬ
9.58-66	8.3.34-48	visarga saṃdhi in compounds
9.67-91	8.3.55-118	Retroflexion of s
9.92-109	8.4.1-39	Retroflexion of n
==== Prasanna Khaṇḍa, "The Charms of Poetry", figures of speech, guṇa, rasa, Prakrit ====
10.1-22	n/a	Figures of sound, śabdālaṃkāra
10.23-75	n/a	Figures of sense, arthālaṃkāra
11	n/a	Mādhūrya guṇa or ‘sweetness’
12	n/a	Bhāvikatva rasa, ‘intensity of expression’
13	n/a	Bhāṣāsama, simultaneous Prakrit and Sanskrit
==== Tiṅanta Khaṇḍa "The Illustration of Finite Verb Forms" ====
14	n/a	The perfect tense
15	n/a	The aorist tense
16	n/a	The simple future
17	n/a	The imperfect tense
18	n/a	The present tense
19	n/a	The optative mood
20	n/a	The imperative mood
21	n/a	The conditional mood
22	n/a	The periphrastic future

=== Grammar ===
==== Prakīrṇa Khaṇḍa “Diverse Rules” ====
In the first section of the poem, the Prakīrṇa Khaṇḍa “Diverse Rules”, where the intention appears to be the illustration of miscellaneous rules, it is not obvious how to determine which specific rule if any is intended to be exemplified in any particular verse. Hundreds of rules could in theory be applicable. The commentators assist somewhat where they cite those rules which they think to be worth quoting in that context. The other guide is the Sanskrit language itself: it is likely that the most unusual or aberrant forms would have been exemplified. The frequent coincidence of these two heuristic principles is also helpful. Where the word in the verse is also given as an example in the grammatical texts then we can be almost certain about the topic.
It could be conjectured at this point that within this section of “Diverse Rules” those verses which were intended to illustrate the grammar would be those without figures of speech or at least with very simple figures. That supposition would be consistent with the lack of ornament in some sections of the poem and would also explain why there is such a marked distinction between Bhaṭṭi’s high style in canto 1 and much of 2 and his plainer style in much of the rest of the poem. It may be that “Bhaṭṭi’s Poem” was first intended to be a typical courtly epic or “high kāvya” and that the idea of creating this new genre of educational poem or “śāstra-kāvya” evolved as the poem was being composed. This is supported by the progression in styles from highly ornate poetry in the first two cantos, through unadorned verse with no apparent systematic exemplification of grammar, the so-called “Diverse Rules Section” Prakīrṇa Khaṇḍa, to the second major section from near the end of canto 5 until the end of canto 9, the Adhikāra Khaṇḍa "Illustration of Particular Topics".

==== Adhikāra Khaṇḍa "The Illustration of Particular Topics" ====
The Adhikāra Khaṇḍa is the "Illustration of Particular Topics" in which the verses exemplify in sequence long series of rules from the “IAST|Aṣṭādhyāyī”. Here again poetry is subjugated to the pedagogic purpose of exemplification: the metre is the humble anuṣṭubh or śloka and there are few figures of speech to decorate the tale. This change of metre from the longer 44 syllable upajāti for the first three cantos to the shorter and simpler 32 syllable anuṣṭubh for the next six may also be indicative of a gradually evolving intention.

===== How does “Bhaṭṭi’s Poem” illustrate Pāṇinian grammar? =====
From the end of canto 5 up to the end of canto 9 the verses exemplify in sequence long series of aphorisms (sūtras) from the Aṣṭādhyāyī of Pāṇini. These aphorisms are short coded rules, almost algebraic in form.

As an example, consider Pāṇini’s rule 6.1.77: 'iko yaṇ aci'. This translates as “When followed by any vowel, the vowels i, u, ṛ and ḷ in any length are respectively replaced by the semivowels y, v, r and l.” This is quite a mouthful of translation for five syllables of Sanskrit. How does Pāṇini do it? To start with, the three words of the rule in their uninflected form are ik, yaṇ and ac which are a type of acronym for their respective series of letters: the simple vowels i, ī, u, ū, ṛ, ṝ, ḷ; the semivowels y, v, r, l; and all the vowels a, ā, i, ī, u, ū, ṛ, ṝ, ḷ, e, o, ai, au. The cases are used to indicate the operation which is to take place: The genitive of ik indicates “In place of ik”; the locative of ac indicates “when ac follows” and yaṇ in the nominative indicates “there should be a yaṇ” or “yaṇ is the replacement”. Pāṇini gives metarules to explain the formation and use of these acronyms and the special uses of the cases within the rules. It is thus a rule for the simple sandhi which would occur for example between the words iti and evam, smoothing the juncture between their vowels into ity evam.

This is but a small taste of the economy, intricacy, beauty and intellectual power of the Aṣṭādhyāyī, surely one of the greatest wonders and perhaps the supreme intellectual achievement of the ancient world. It is to the layman a treasure chest whose key is locked deep inside itself. However, the reader does not have to be familiar with this system to enjoy the Bhaṭṭikāvya. By using the references to the “IAST|Aṣṭādhyāyī” given in the table above, the reader may refer to the rules as he reads and become familiar with them in advance of reading each verse. The examples used in “Bhaṭṭi’s Poem” are not included in the actual aphorisms of the “IAST|Aṣṭādhyāyī” themselves but are ones given by later commentators to facilitate discussion. The most widely used traditional examples are included in the two editions of the “IAST|Aṣṭādhyāyī” cited in the bibliography below.

==== Tiṅanta Khaṇḍa "The Illustration of Finite Verbs" ====
Each canto from 14 through to 22 illustrates a particular mood or tense. (For more details see the table above.)

==== Relation to grammatical tradition (Vyākaraṇa) ====
A detailed study of the examples given in the Bhaṭṭikāvya compared with those of the earlier “Great Commentary” Mahābhāṣya of Patañjali and later works such as the “Kashi Commentary” Kāśikā and the “Moonlight on the Tradition” Siddhāntakaumudī still remains to be done. It remains to be seen to what extent examples of usage may have been introduced into the grammatical tradition by “Bhaṭṭi’s Poem”. The poem itself might then have become an authority on usage.

=== Poetics ===
==== Canto 10: the figures of speech ====
This section of the poem has been the most studied in modern times. It constitutes an important text in its own right in the history of Sanskrit poetics. That said, its importance lies in its raising far more questions than it answers. Chronologically it stands between the “Science of Theatre” Nāṭyaśāstra as the earliest surviving text on Sanskrit poetics and the first great systematic treatments of the subject in the “Mirror of Poetry” Kāvyādarśa of Daṇḍin (660–680 ce) and the “Ornament of Poetry” Kāvyālaṃkāra of Bhāmaha (700 ce). Tantalizingly, we have the examples only and not the explanations or contemporary commentaries. A major problem of Sanskrit poetics is the lack of agreement on any system of nomenclature for the figures. The figures are given names in some manuscripts of the Bhaṭṭikāvya but this is no proof that these were the names that Bhaṭṭi knew. The fact that this naming of figures is quite different from that of the writers on poetics suggests that they might well pre-date them. If this is the case then in these we have the fragmentary residua of a missing link in the tradition of poetics. It is most likely that Bhaṭṭi based his treatment of the figures of speech on a text now lost. Other questions about this canto present themselves. Why is there only one example of alliteration (anuprāsa)? Was this figure not fully elaborated until Daṇḍin? Why do those verses said to exhibit the figure ‘illuminator’ dīpaka in the manuscripts show nothing of the sort according to later theorists? Given that many of the verses contain more than one figure, does this mean that they were not intended to be a systematic illustration of figures but rather a collection of verses showing diverse poetic traits? Since the order of the names given in the manuscripts corresponds to the order of figures treated by Daṇḍin, did he base his work on this order or were the names applied retrospectively to “Bhaṭṭi’s Poem” in an attempt to match it up to later systems? That “Bhaṭṭi’s Poem” canto 10 is a major work on Sanskrit poetics is amply demonstrated by Söhnen in her examination of ‘doubling’ yamaka of 10.2–22 showing that the treatment of this figure in Daṇḍin’s “Mirror of Poetry” and Bhāmaha’s “Ornament of Poetry” is influenced by the Bhaṭṭikāvya.

==== Cantos 11 and 12: guṇa and rasa ====
Cantos 11 and 12 are held to display respectively the quality guṇa of “sweetness” mādhurya and the sentiment rasa of “intensity of expression” bhāvikatva. The texts describing these qualities post-date Bhaṭṭi so again we cannot be sure that he intended to illustrate what happens to be described by later authors. Assuming that Bhaṭṭi did intend to show these, their precise characteristics described in his source text would be best discovered from careful analysis of the language of his own work rather than from the pronouncements of later writers on poetics.

=== Simultaneous Prakrit and Sanskrit "bhāṣāsama": Canto 13 ===
Canto 13 is written in what is called “like the vernacular” bhāṣāsama, that is, it can be read in two languages simultaneously: Prakrit and Sanskrit. The Prakrit used here is of course no real vernacular but a literary version almost as highly codified as Sanskrit. Because of this Prakrit’s similarity to Sanskrit it can be read in that elevated language by someone with no knowledge of Prakrit. With minor exceptions the vocabulary and grammar used are common to both languages. Where the grammar is not common the differences are disguised by sandhi. As many of the Prakrit terminations originate in Sanskrit forms generalised to their most common forms in sandhi, this is not impossible. As an example, the nominative singular of substantives in -a in Sanskrit is -aḥ and in Prakrit it is -o. In verse 13.2 we have three nominative singulars in -a: bhīmaḥ, rasaḥ and samaḥ. In Prakrit they would be bhimo, raso and samo. Because the following words all begin with voiced consonants, in Sanskrit sandhi the ending -aḥ is in all these cases changed to -o, thus making the form indistinguishable from the Prakrit. Where the Sanskrit termination is undisguisably altered in Prakrit as for example with the instrumental plural -bhiḥ which becomes -hi, these terminations are concealed within compounds. It is for this reason that long compounds are so extensively used in this canto. The reader will also notice a lack of finite verb forms. It is more common for participle forms to be the same in the two languages. On occasion the commentators need a deal of learning and ingenuity to explain how forms are defensible in both languages. For instance in verse 13.3 the Sanskrit sabhā “hall” would normally become sahā in Prakrit by the rule khaghathadhabhāṃ haḥ “h is the replacement for kh, gh, th, dh and bh,” (Prākṛtaprakāśa 2.27). Mallinātha defends the retention of sabhā in Prakrit by saying that there is the continued operation (anuvṛtti) of prāyaḥ “generally” from an earlier rule. With the exception of verse 13.7 which is irregular and verses 13.26–28 which are in the upajāti metre, the entire canto is composed in the āryāgīti metre which is the older lyric metre most commonly used for Prakrit texts.

=== Morphology ===
Cantos 14 through to the end at canto 22 are each written in a particular tense or mood. Given that this is a rather broad restriction it is surprising that Bhaṭṭi does not indulge in more ornamentation in these verses. He does include many obscurer roots here but in other respects his language is simple and uncluttered.

== Influence beyond India ==
The influence of "Bhaṭṭi’s Poem" has extended to Java where it became the source text for the Old Javanese Rāmāyaṇa which is the oldest surviving example of classical Javanese epic poetry (Kakawin). The Javanese Kakawin Rāmāyaṇa follows “Bhaṭṭi’s Poem” closely as far as canto 12, sometimes to the extent of directly translating a verse, but begins to diverge thereafter. It would seem that the form of “Bhaṭṭi’s Poem” as a ‘great poem’ mahākāvya was important to the Javanese author as many of his additions make more complete the Old-Javanese Rāmāyaṇa’s conformity to the genre as described by Daṇḍin, indicating that his “Mirror of Poetry” or its precursor as followed by Bhaṭṭi was also available to him. Moreover Hooykaas has also shown that the Old-Javanese Rāmāyaṇa uses ‘doubling’ yamaka under Bhaṭṭi’s influence.

== Bibliography ==
=== Editions ===
- Fallon, Oliver. 2009. Bhatti’s Poem: The Death of Rávana (Bhaṭṭikāvya). New York: Clay Sanskrit Library. ISBN 978-0-8147-2778-2 | ISBN 0-8147-2778-6
- Joshi, V. N. S. and Sarma, S. V. 1914. The Bhaṭṭikāvya of Bhaṭṭi with the Commentary of Jayamangala. Bombay: Nirnaya Sagar Press.
- Shastri, Shri Shesharaj Sharma. Undated. Haridas Sanskrit Series no. 136: Bhaṭṭikāvyam, Edited with the Candrakala-Vidyotini Sanskrit-Hindi Commentary. 3 vols. Varanasi: Chowkhambha Sanskrit Series Office.
- Kamlashankar Trivedi (1898). "Bombay Sanskrit Series no. 56: The Bhaṭṭikāvya or Rāvaṇavadha composed by Śri Bhaṭṭi with the Commentary of Mallinātha with critical and explanatory notes. 2 vols. Bombay". Internet Archive.

=== Translations ===
- An anonymous introduction and translation of the first canto, published in The Pandit, Varanasi (1867).
- Brough, J. 1951. Selections from Classical Sanskrit Literature, with English Translation and Notes. London: Luzac and Co.
- Brough, J. JB N/4 Notes on the Bhattikavya undated: 1 bundle (1) and 1 vol (2) English and Sanskrit, JB N/4/1 Draft transcription and translation of cantos 1–2, 10, 15 and 22, incomplete, JB N/4/2 Notes on cantos 1–2. University of Cambridge, Faculty of Oriental Studies, Archive Collections.
- Leonardi; G[iuseppe]. G[iovanni]. 1972. Bhattikavyam. Translation and notes. Leiden: Brill.
- Fallon, Oliver. 2009. Bhatti’s Poem: The Death of Rávana (Bhaṭṭikāvya). New York: Clay Sanskrit Library. ISBN 978-0-8147-2778-2 | ISBN 0-8147-2778-6
- Karandikar, Maheshwar Anant & Shailaja Karandikar. 1982. Bhatti-kavyam, edited with an English translation. New Delhi, Motilal Banarsidass.
- Turner, R. L. JB B/12 Translation of the Bhattikavya, undated, 2 vols. JB B/12/1 Translation of cantos 6–14, Annotated by Brough; JB B/12/2 Translation of cantos 15–17. University of Cambridge, Faculty of Oriental Studies, Archive Collections.

=== Secondary Literature ===
- Anderson, Rev. P. 1850. Journal of the Bombay Branch of the Royal Asiatic Society. Vol 3. No 13: Some Account of the Bhatti Kavya. M.A.
- Gerow, Edwin. 1971. A Glossary of Indian Figures of Speech. The Hague: Mouton.
- Gerow, Edwin. 1977. A History of Indian Literature: Vol. V, fasc. 3 Indian Poetics. Wiesbaden: Otto Harassowitz.
- Henry, Patricia B. 2001. “The Poetics of the Old Javanese Rāmāyaņa: A Comparison with the Sanskrit Bhaṭṭikāvya”, presented at The International Rāmayana Conference, Northern Illinois University, DeKalb, Illinois. September 21–23, 2001
- Hooykaas, C. 1957. “On Some Arthālaṃkāras in the Baṭṭikāvya X”. Bulletin of the School of Oriental and African Studies: Vol. 20, No 3, Studies in Honour of Sir Ralph Turner, Director of the School of Oriental and African Studies, 1937–57, London: SOAS.
- Hooykaas, C. 1958. The Old Javanese Rāmāyaṇa, an Exemplary Kakawin as to Form and Content. Amsterdam.
- Kane, P. V. 1971. History of Sanskrit Poetics. Delhi: Motilal Banarsidass.
- Keith, A. B. 1928. A History of Sanskrit literature. Oxford: The Clarendon press.
- Narang, Satya Pal. 1969. Bhaṭṭikāvya, A Study. Delhi: Motilal Banarsidass.
- Narang, Satya Pal. 2003. An Analysis of the Prākṛta of Bhāśā-sama of the Bhaṭṭi-kāvya (Canto XII). In: Prof. Mahapatra G.N., Vanijyotih: Felicitation Volume, Utkal University, Bhuvaneshwar.
- Söhnen, Renate. 1995. “On the Concept and Presentation of ‘yamaka’ in Early Indian Poetic Theory”. In: Bulletin of the School of Oriental and African Studies Vol. 58. No. 3 p 495–520.
- Sudyaka, Lidia. 2002. What Does the Bhaṭṭi-kāvya teach? In Essays in Indian Philosophy, Religion and Literature edited by Piotr Balcerowicz and Marek Mejor, Warsaw.
