= Kavyalankara =

Kavyalankara (Sanskrit: काव्यालङ्कार, Kāvyālaṅkāra) ("The ornaments of poetry") is the name of two works in Sanskrit poetics (see the author's articles for details on the works):

- Kāvyālaṅkāra by Bhamaha (c. 7th century), roughly contemporaneous with Daṇḍin
- Kāvyālaṅkāra by Rudrata, a Kashmirian poet of c. 9th century
