= Dandin =

Dandin can refer to:

- Daṇḍin, 7th-8th century Sanskrit writer
- Daṇḍin XY, 20th-21st century musician and author
- Dandin (audio platform), Middle East audio platform.
- The Dandin Group, a wireless internet thinktank
- Dandin the Sword Carrier, a character appearing in Mariel of Redwall and The Bellmaker, two books from the fictional Redwall series by Brian Jacques
