= Bitextual work =

Writing form

Bitextual work (or bi-textual work) is a form of writing in which a single sequence of words yields two or more distinct interpretations by exploiting lexical polysemy and structural ambiguity. It resembles a pun in its use of multiple meanings, but differs in that it is crafted to support distinct narrative and semantic readings rather than a single humorous effect.

This literary technique was widely used in Classical Sanskrit literature and influenced its adoption in various later Indian vernacular traditions. In Sanskrit, it is termed śleṣa, often translated as “embrace” in the sense of linguistic combination or semantic overlap. Scholarly accounts trace the development of elaborate śleṣa poetry to around the 6th century CE, and examples appear in Sanskrit as well as in later regional literary traditions of South Asia throughout the medieval and early modern eras of South Asian literature. In modern times, the writing of bitextual poems has sometimes been viewed by modern critics as overly artificial or excessively ornamental.

The term "bitextual work," or more specifically "bitextual poetry," should not be confused with "bidirectional poetry," a genre of Sanskrit poetry in which each stanza can be read both from left to right and from right to left, with the two readings yielding different meanings. The poem Rāmakṛṣṇavilomakāvyaṃ (c. 1580) by Sūryadāsa is a well-known example of bidirectional poetry.

== Examples of bitextual verse ==
Daṇḍin (fl. 7th–8th century) in his Kāvyādarśa, which is the earliest surviving systematic treatment of poetics in Sanskrit, illustrates the concept of sleṣa with the following verse:

असावुदयमारूढः कान्तिमान् रक्तमण्डलः ।
राजा हरति लोकस्य हृदयं मृदुभिः करैः ॥

asāvudayamārūdhah kāntimān raktamandalah ।
rājāharati lokasya hrdayam mrdubhih karaih ॥

The meaning of this verse can be understood in two different ways as follows (translated):

- “This person has ascended the region of prosperity and is full of splendour; and the mandalas of districts are attached to him; and he, the king, captivates the hearts of the people by light taxes."

- "This resplendent moon has ascended the heavens and is full of splendour and is reddish (as he newly rises), and he captivates the people by soft rays."

These two interpretations arise due to the multiple meanings of words that appear in the verse. The word "udaya" has several meanings. In the first interpretation, it refers to a king’s rise to power; in the second, it refers to the eastern mountain over which the moon ascends. Likewise, the word "maṇḍala" translates to "circle", like the moon’s disc, which is the meaning used in the second translation of the verse. However, it can also refer to a king’s circle of allies, which is the meaning chosen in the first translation. The word "kara" refers to taxes levied by a king, but it can also be translated as "[the moon’s] rays". In a more general setting, such as in Sanskrit traditions, the moon itself is imagined as the king of the stars.

Daṇḍin has followed the above verse with the following verse, which may be thought of as the continuation of a poem:

दोषाकरेण सम्बन्धन् नक्षत्रपथवर्तिना ।
राज्ञा प्रदोषो मामिथमप्रियं किं न बाधते ॥

doṣākareṇa sambandhan nakṣatrapathavartinā ।
rājñā pradoṣo māmithamapriyaṃ kiṃ na bādhate ॥

The two different translations of the verse are as follows:

- "Having secured an alliance with that vicious king, whose conduct is far from noble, is there anything to stop this villain from tormenting his enemy — me?"

- "Now that he’s joined by that nocturnal king, who resides among the planets, is there anything to stop the evening from tormenting me, separated from my beloved?"

To get different meanings, the words in the verse may have to be split up differently. For example, the word "nakṣatra" without splitting up means "planet", but it can be split up as "na" + "kṣatra", which then has the meaning "not a warrior".

== Bitextual work in India ==
Early Sanskrit poets appear to have used śleṣa sparingly. For example, śleṣa rarely occurs in Valmiki’s Ramayana, which the textual tradition considers the first instance of poetry. Early versified kavyas such as the poems and plays written by Aśvaghoṣa (2nd cent. CE) and Kālidāsa(4th or 5th cent. CE) are other examples of the infrequent use of śleṣa.

Śleṣan appears prominently for the first time in the works of the sixth-century CE poet Bhāravi. One of the earliest literary works to use śleṣan extensively is Vāsavadattā, a classical Sanskrit romantic prose narrative attributed to the sixth-century author Subandhu. Although little is known about Subandhu, there are more than twenty surviving commentaries on Vāsavadattā, suggesting that it was widely read and influential.

== Notable bitextual works ==
The following is a partial list of some of the notable bitextual works written in Sanskrit still available today:

- Cidambarakavi, Pañcakalyānacampū
- Cidambarakavi, Rāghavapāndavayādavīya (c. 1600)
- Dhanañjaya, Dvisandhāna Mahākāvya (c. 800)
- Haradatta Sūri, Rāghavanaisadhīya (c. 1700)
- Hemacandrasūri, Nābheyanemikāvya (c. 1125)
- Kavirāja, Rāghavapāndavīya (c. 1175)
- Krsnakavi, Naisadhapārijāta (seventeenth century)
- Krsnapandita, Rāghavapāndavīya (c. 1250)
- Sandhyākaranandin, Rāmacaritam (c. 1100)
- Śesācalapati, Kosalabhosalīya (c. 1700)
- Vasupraharāja, Rāghavayādavīya (eighteenth century)
- Venkatādhvari, Yādavarāghavīya (c. 1650)
- Vidyāmādhava, Pārvatīrukminīya (c. 1200)
