= Rudrata =

Kashmiri poet and literary theorist

Rudrata (Sanskrit: रुद्रट, Rudraṭa) (c. 9th-century) was a Kashmiri poet and literary theorist, who wrote a work called the Kavyalankara in the first quarter of the ninth century. Very little is known about Rudrata. From Namisadhu's commentary on the verses 12-14 of the fifth chapter of the Kavyalankara, it is inferred that he was also known as Shatananda and his father's name was Bhamuka.

== Kavyalankara ==
It is a notable work in the line of poeticians such as Bhamaha, Dandin and Anandavardhana. It is divided into 16 chapters and it comprises 734 verses, excluding 14 verses in the 12th chapter on eight types of Nayika, which are considered as the later interpolations. Most of the work was composed in the Arya metre with a few exceptions, particularly at the end of the chapters. The 13th chapter, comprising only 17 verses is the shortest one. The 7th and the 8th chapters, comprising 111 and 110 verses are the longest. The first chapter begins with the invocation of Ganesha and Gauri.

It is also noted among chess historians for containing one of the earliest references to chess in India, and the earliest example of a knight's tour. In Sanskrit literary theory, it is notable for articulating the idea of auchitya, or propriety of theme.

It represents, in a sense, the culmination of the alankara-focused tradition in Sanskrit poetics.

=== Commentaries ===
Three known commentaries are written on the Kavyalankara. The most significant commentary was written by Namisadhu, a Śvetāmbara Jain and pupil of Shalibhadra in 1125 Vikrama Samvat (1068-69). Other two commentaries on this work were written by Vallabhadeva and Gopalabhatta. Gopalabhatta's commentary is titled Rasatarangini.
