= Nandikeshvara =

Indian playwright (5th – 4th century BC)

Nandikeshvara (Sanskrit: नन्दिकेश्वर; 5th century – 4th century BC) was a major theatrologist of ancient India. He was the author of the Abhinaya Darpana lit. 'The Mirror of Gesture'.

== Influence on Bharata ==
Nandikeshvara seems to have preceded Bharata, according to Ramakrishna Kavi. Some consider him to be Bharata's master. The most concrete example of Nandikeshvara's teachings have survived thanks to Bharata. The poet and playwright Bharata who wrote in Sanskrit, scrupulously executed "in his stage direction a good number of theoretical instructions received from Nandikeshvara, overtly disregarding the strict injunctions formulated by Bharata as it is manifest in the spectacle of kutiyattam." Bharata’s plays had seemed, indeed, to ignore major inhibitions imposed by Bharata : for instance, that of fighting or inflicting capital punishment on the stage, etc. Even if it cannot be proved that the Kutiyattam is as old as Bharata's texts, nobody can disregard the considerable influence of this prince among playwrights on the traditional abhinaya we are speaking of, probably one of the oldest in the world.

== The Place of Bharata ==
A few years before World War I, Pandit Ganapati Sastri, near Padmanabha-Pura in Kerala, found a bundle of about two-thousand-year-old palm-leaf manuscripts containing eleven texts composed by the legendary dramatist Bharata.

Although Bharata's texts had mysteriously disappeared, his contributions had been, however, remembered by Kalidasa himself in the 4th century in his play malavikagnimitra, by Banabhatta in the 7th century in his harshacharita and, early in the 8th century, by Bhavabhuti (author of the play malatimadhava). Thus, Bharata had remained not only a model for his posterity but, in the 4th century BC – out of the theme of Charudatta accredited to him -, Shudraka had recreated the famous play known as the mrit-shakaTika. Even in the 12th century, Jayadeva, author of the gita govinda, had hailed Bharata as the "smile of the Goddess of Poetry".

== Abhinaya (Stage-craft) ==
Since about two thousand years, among the treatises on abhinaya known in India, there has been an uninterrupted flow of compilations containing the teachings and the reflections of several prestigious masters, with commentary by other specialists of successive centuries.

Between the two land-marks – Bharata's Natya Shastra (2nd century BCE) and Matanga Muni's Brihaddeshi (c. 5th century) -, majestic stands out Nandikeshvara's Abhinaya Darpana. Although the final penning of this work was known to have been completed after that of the natya-shastra, Indian and Western historians place Nandikeshvara's school between the 5th and the 2nd centuries BC. After Matanga, Damodara Mishra in the Kuttini Mata (8th century), Rajasekhara in his Kavya Mimamsa (9th century), Abhinavagupta in the Abhinava Bharati (11th century), Sharngadeva in the Sangita Ratnakara (13th century) – among others – have continued paying tribute to Nandikeshvara's specific contributions.

A number of details in the staging of the Kutiyattam affirm first of all specialists' opinion that Nandikeshvara's influence had been deeper and wider on the concerned population than that of Bharata, at least owing to the geographical distance. Moreover, these very details refer so often to passages of the Abhinaya Darpana that there is no hesitation in recognising the proximity of this theatre with the place and the epoch that were Nandikeshvara's. It has been demonstrated that the actors of the Kutiyattam willingly learn by heart and put into practice instructions formulated by Nandikeshvara, without always knowing or acknowledging their source. This is, however, an unexpected yet irrefutable confirmation of my hypothesis about the relationship existing between Nandikeshvara and this traditional abhinaya.

== Pleasure: its sources ==
Mammata Bhatta (11th century) defined rasa in his kâvya-prakâsha as "the great savour that uplifts our spirit by endowing it with a taste of true grandeur… Something that has to be felt, that throbs around us, that penetrates and altogether fills our heart (…), that completely rids of all other sensation.”

Nandikeshvara distinguishes two sources of pleasure in the spectacle: first of all, a visual support; and another, auditory. The former is composed of dance, mimes, gestures, dramatic expressions of the eyes and the face. The second explores the innate and potential wealth of a language, phonic as well as semantic, and transfigures everything in contact with music : horizontally, owing to the rhythmic diversities (situated in Time) and, vertically, thanks to the ascending and descending impulses, as well as to the overtones on the scale of the microtones (situated in Space).

== Object of the stage-craft: Rasa ==
Describing the process of rasa, as object of abhinaya, Kutiyattam adepts quote in Malayalam : "It is the mouth that utters the song, the hand outlines the meaning, the look enlivens the sentiment, the feet catch the measure and go on beating it. Where go the hands, goes the gaze; where goes the gaze, poses the mind; where there is mind, settle down the sentiments; where the sentiments rule sovereign, rasa arises." Closer to the poet Bhasa, they have been suspected of having certain distinct aesthetic principles that were, deliberately, not inspired by rules that Bharata had instituted. Guessing what that tradition is, the above quotation is exactly what the verse or shloka 37 of the abhinaya-darpana by Nandikeshvara describes in Sanskrit:

yato hastas tato dṛiṣṭir
yato dṛiṣṭis tato manaḥ
yato manas tato bhāvo
yato bhāvas tato rasaḥ

== Works ==
- Nandikeśvara (1917). The Mirror of Gesture – Being the Abhinaya Darpana of Nandikeśvara. Translated by Kentish Coomaraswamy, Ananda; Kristnayya Duggirala, Gopala. Harvard University Press.
