= Anandavardhana =

Indian philosopher of aesthetics (820–890)

Ānandavardhana (c. 820 – 890 CE) was a Kashmiri court poet and literary critic, honored with the title of Rajanak during King Avantivarman's reign. Anandavardhana authored the Dhvanyāloka, or A Light on Suggestion (dhvani), a work articulating the philosophy of "aesthetic suggestion" (dhvani, vyañjanā).

Ānandavardhana is credited with creating the dhvani theory. He wrote that dhvani (meaning sound, or resonance) is the "soul" or "essence" (ātman) of poetry (kavya)." "When the poet writes," said Ānandavardhana, "he creates a resonant field of emotions." To understand the poetry, the reader or hearer must be on the same "wavelength." The method requires sensitivity on the parts of the writer and the reader. The complete Dhvanyāloka together with Abhinavagupta's commentary on it has been translated into English by the Sanskritist Daniel H.H. Ingalls and his collaborators.

Ānandavardhana is mentioned in Kalhana's Rajatarangini. He was noted to not have cited or commented on Daṇḍin's work, instead preferring Bhamaha or Udbhata.

== Dhvanyāloka ==
Anandavardhana classifies three categories of poetry:

1. Dhvani kavya (prominence of suggestion)
2. Gunibhuta vyangakavya (secondary place of suggestion)
3. Chitra kavya (portrait like - absence of suggestion)

He categorizes Dhvani kavya as the best form of poetry, Gunibhuta vangiya kavya as the second class and the third or lowest class is said to be Chitra kavya.

The philosopher Abhinavagupta (c. 950 – 1016 CE) wrote an important commentary on Dhvanyāloka titled the Locana, or The Eye.

== Assessment by Modern Sanskritists ==
Modern Sanskritists have a very high opinion of Ānandavardhana. Commenting on Ānandavardhana's Dhvanyāloka, P.V. Kane writes that "the Dhvanyāloka is an epoch-making work in the history of Alaṅkāra literature. It occupies the same position in poetics as Pāṇini's Aṣtādhyāyī in grammar and Śaṅkarācarya's commentary on Vedānta". Daniel H.H. Ingalls calls Ānandavardhana "the most brilliant of all Sanskrit critics".

Sushil Kumar De, along with Kane, considered there to be no work similar to the Dhvanyaloka in the corpus of Sanskrit literature. Franklin Edgerton and Louis Renou also considered the work to ge exceptional in its treatment of poetic theory and aesthetics.

Lawrence McCrea considers the Dhvanyaloka to be influenced by Mīmāṃsā, particularly by how it approached an exegesis of the Vedas.
