= Kamlashankar Trivedi =

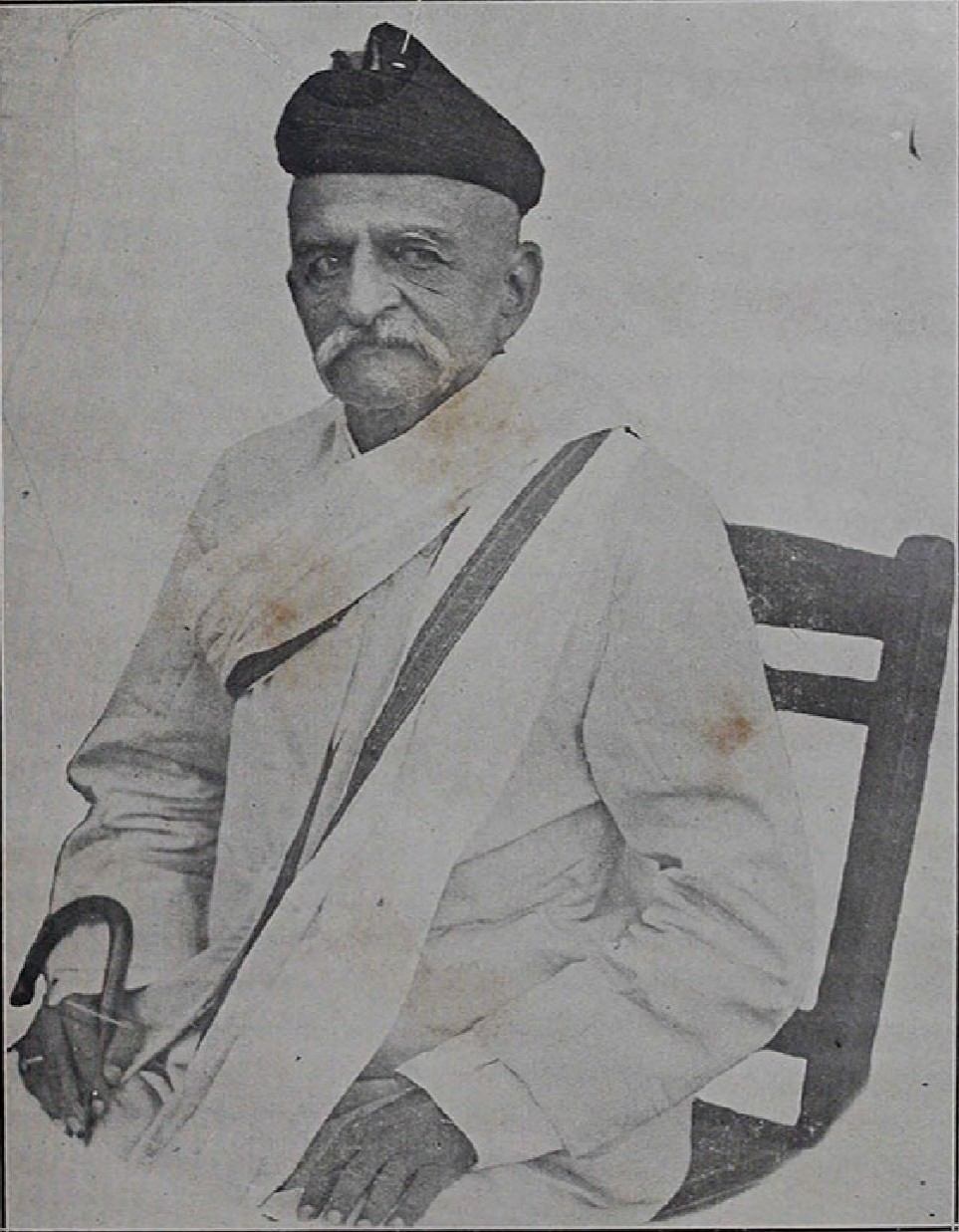
Kamlashankar Trivedi

Kamlashankar Pranshankar Trivedi (11 October 1857 – 1925) was a Gujarati language editor and grammarian.

== Life ==
Kamlashankar was born on 11 October 1857 at Surat. He completed his primary and secondary education in Surat. He passed matriculation in 1874. He completed Bachelor of Arts in economy and history from Elphinstone College in 1878. Due to poor financial condition, he joined as an extra teacher in Mission School, Surat. Later he taught in primary and secondary level at Bharuch, Nadiad, Surat, Ahmedabad, Bhavnagar, Bombay and Pune.

He served as a principal of Premchand Raichand Training College in Ahmedabad in 1902 and edited Gujarat Shalapatra. He served as an examiner of Sanskrit in University of Bombay and Panjab University. He retired in 1914. He presided over the seventh session of Gujarati Sahitya Parishad in 1924.

He died in 1925.

== Works ==
He was educated in economy and history while he taught Sanskrit. He published several works on grammar and translated several Sanskrit works. His editing is influenced by Sanskrit.

He wrote England no Tunko Itihas (1887), Gods of India (1913), Shiksahnshastrana Mooltatvo (1913), Shankar Jayanti Vyakhyanmala (1913), Gujarati Bhashanu Vyakaran (1914-16), Karakmimansa (1915), Madhyam Vyakaran (1917) and the forty chapters Gujarati grammar, Brihad Vyakaran (1919). He wrote the short history of India titled Hindustan no Sankshipta Itihas (1920). His works Kavyasahitya Mimansa (1930) and Anubhavvinod (1933) were published posthumously. He translated Samuel Smiles's Duty into Gujarati.

He edited several textbooks; Sanskrit Book 1-2 (1896), Sanskritshikshika (The Sanskrit Teacher, 1911), Sahityamanjari (1915), Gujarati/Trivedi Vanchanmala (1921).

He edited Bhaṭṭikāvya (1898), Jagannath's Rekha Ganit (1901-1902), Vidyadhar's Ekavali (1908), Vishwanath's Prataprudryashobhushan (1909), Lakshmidhara's Shadbhashachandrika (1918), Ramchandra's Prakriyakaumudi, Vararuchi's Prakrit Prakash, Kond Bhatt's Vyakaranbhushan.

== See also ==
- List of Gujarati-language writers
