= Rāmakṛṣṇavilomakāvyaṃ =

Sanskrit poem

Rāmakṛṣṇavilomakāvyaṃ (रामकृष्णविलोमाकाव्यं) is a short Sanskrit poem in 36 verses in the genre of vilomakāvya composed by Sūryadasa (born 1508), also known as Sūrya Daivajña or Sūrya Paṇḑita, from Pārthapura. A vilomakāvya (called "bi-directional poetry" in English) is a poem composed in such a way that the śloka-s or stanzas of the poem can be read in both directions, that is from left to right which the normal mode of reading the poem, and also in the opposite direction, that is, from right to left. Readings in both directions produce meaningful texts and these meanings create a continuous narration. In the case of Rāmakṛṣṇavilomakāvyaṃ, the reading in the left to right direction narrates the story of Rāma in Rāmāyaṇa and the reading in the opposite direction narrates the story of Kṛṣṇa in Mahābhārata. A Hindi translation of the work with detailed commentary is available, but no English translation has yet been published (as of June 2024).

While reading a stanza in a vilomakāvya, the relevant units are the syllables and not individual phonemes. The verses can be of two types: in the first type, called viṣamākṣara, the verse sounds different when read in the two directions, and in the second type, called samākṣara or tulyākṣara,the verse sounds the same when read either way. There are both types of verses in Rāmakṛṣṇavilomakāvyaṃ.

The first verse in Rāmakṛṣṇavilomakāvyaṃ reproduced below is an example of viṣamākṣara verse:

तं भूसुतामुक्तिमुदारहासं वन्दे यतो भव्यभवं दयाश्रीः ।
श्रीयादवं भव्यभतोयदेवं संहारदामुक्तिमुतासुभूतम् ॥

taṃ bhūsutā-muktimudāra-hasaṃ vande yato bhavyabhavaṃ dayāśrīḥ ।
śrīyādavaṃ bhavya-bha-toya-devaṃ saṃhāra-da-muktimutāsubhūtaṃ ।।

Verse 31 in Rāmakṛṣṇavilomakāvyaṃ reproduced below is an example for samākṣara verse:

शङ्कावज्ञानुत्वनुज्ञावकाशं याने नद्यामुग्रमुद्याननेया ।
याने नद्यामुग्रमुद्याननेया शंकावज्ञानुत्वनुज्ञावकाशम् ॥

śaṅkāvajñānutvanujñāvakāśaṃ yāne nadydmugramudyānaneyā ।
yāne nadydmugramudyānaneyā śaṃkāvajñānutvanujñāvakāśaṃ ।।

== Other vilomakāvya-s ==
According to Christopher Minkowski, Boden Professor of Sanskrit at the University of Oxford from 2005 to 2023, Rāmakṛṣṇavilomakāvyaṃ is the first vilomakāvya ever composed and its author Sūryadasa is the inventor of the genre. Great effort has to be expended in creating a vilomakāvya. Sūryadasa himself has recorded as much in the concluding stanza of the poem an English translation of which reads like this:

"The sage made the Godavari flow east from the Brahma (Sahyadri) mountains to the ocean; but is even he able to make the river flow backward to its mountain source? Cognoscenti should appreciate the huge effort that the author of this viloma work has made, and should recognize that this, the very limit of poetic skill in citrakāvya, has been marked by the one called Daivajña Sūrya."

The following are the identified vilomakāvya-s:

1. Śabdārthacintāmaṇi by Cidambara Kavi (c. 1600)
2. Yādavarāghavīya by Venkatādhvarin (c. 1650)
3. Nalaharścandrīya (unknown authorship and date)

== Full text of the work ==
- For full text with Hindi translation and commentary by Dr. Shri Kameshwar Nath Mishra: Daivajña-śrī-sūrya-kaviḥ (1970). Rāma-kṛṣṇa-viloma-kāvyam (with Sanskrit and Hindi Explanations). Varanasi: Chaukhamba Sanskrit Series Office.
- For Sanskrit text with commentary by the author: Daivagnya Suri (1890). Ramakrishnakhyam Viloma Kavyam. Amar Press.

== See also ==
- Bitextual work
