= Sri Raghava Yadhaveeyam =

Sanskrit text

Rāghava-yādavīya is a short Sanskrit poem (laghukāvya) of 30 stanzas, composed by Veṅkaṭādhvarin in Kanchi around 1650 CE. It is a "bidirectional" poem (anuloma-pratiloma-akṣara-kāvya) which narrates the story of Rāma when read forwards, and a story from Krishna's life (that of the Pārijāta tree) when each verse is read backwards. For example, the second stanza, where both the narratives begin, describes the city where Rama was born:

साकेताख्या ज्यायामासीद्या विप्रादीप्तार्याधारा ।
पूराजीतादेवाद्याविश्वासाग्र्या सावाशारावा ॥

sāketākhyā jyāyām āsīd yā viprādīptāryādhārā /
pūr ājītādevādyāviśvāsāgryā sāvāśārāvā //

"On earth [jyāyām] there was a city Sāketa that was illuminated by the wise (Brahmans) [viprādīptā] and sustained by Vaiśyas [āryādhārā]. The son of Aja (i.e. king Dasharatha) won [ājītā] it. This distinguished (city) distrusted (only) non-gods and the like [a-deva-ādya-aviśvāsa], and (was filled with the satisfied) sound of the eaters of sacrifices [sāvāśārāvā], i.e. the gods."

but when the syllables are read backwards, it describes Krishna's city:

वाराशावासाग्र्या साश्वा विद्यावादेताजीरा पू ।
राधार्याप्ता दीप्रा विद्यासीमा या ज्याख्याता के सा ॥

vārāśāv āsāgryā sāśvā vidyāvādetājīrā pūḥ |
rādhāryāptā dīprā vidyāsīmā yā jyākhyātā ke sā ||

"By the water [ke] near the lake [vārāśau] there was a distinguished city (named Dvārakā) equipped with horses, a place of (learned men) who had carried off the victory in the battle for knowledge [vidyā-vāda-ita-āji-irā], brilliantly [dīprā], (because) they had received Rādhā's lord (i.e. Krishna); (it was) the remotest frontier of knowledge and its fame widespread on earth [jyā-khyātā]."

It has been published several times along with a commentary by the author himself. In 1972, it was published from the Institut Français d’Indologie in Pondicherry, with the Sanskrit text edited by M. S. Narasimhacharya and a study and translation by Marie-Claude Porcher. All 30 stanzas are written in the vidyunmālā metre, containing 32 syllables that are each long (guru).

== Author ==
The author Sri Venkatadhvari (17 century) was born at Arasanipalai near Kancheepuram and was a follower of Sri Vedanta Desikan. He had mastery in poetry and rhetoric. He had composed 14 works, the most important of them being Lakshmisahasram by composing which he got back his lost eyesight.

== See also ==
- Rāmakṛṣṇavilomakāvyaṃ
