= Kāvya =

Sanskrit genre of literary poetry

Kāvya (Devanagari: काव्य, IAST: kāvyá) was the Sanskrit literary style used by Indian court poets flourishing between c. 200 BCE and 1200 CE.

This literary style, which includes both poetry and prose, is characterised by abundant usage of figures of speech such as metaphors, similes, and hyperbole to create its characteristic emotional effects. The result is a short lyrical work, court epic, narrative or dramatic work. Kāvya can refer to the style or the completed body of literature. Aśvaghoṣa (c. 80–150 CE), a philosopher and poet considered the father of Sanskrit drama, is attributed with first using the term.

== Early kāvya ==
Although very little literature in the kāvya style written before the time of Kālidāsa (5th century CE) survives, it can be assumed that it dates back to an early time from quotations in Patañjali's grammatical treatise the Mahābhāṣya (2nd century BCE), as well as from poems written on various inscriptions of the 4th to 6th centuries CE.

One early epic work in this style is the Buddhacarita ("A Life of Buddha") (Note: The work calls itself a mahākāvya) by Aśvaghoṣa (2nd century CE). Only the first half of this survives in Sanskrit, and the rest in a Chinese translation made c. 420 CE.

== Mahākāvya ==
Kālidāsa (Note: "India's greatest poet" - Macdonell) (Note: called by many the Shakespeare of India, with Monier-Williams said to be the first to do so.) is believed to have lived in the early 5th century CE. He is the author of two epics, the Raghuvaṃśa and Kumārasambhava. These two epics are traditionally known as mahākāvya "great epics".

Other writers of great epics were Bhāravi (6th century CE), author of Kirātārjunīya; Māgha (c. 7th Century CE), author of Śiśupālav-adha, an epic famous for its linguistic ingenuity; and Śrīharṣa (12th century CE), author of Naiṣadhīya-carita. Another epic, often called a mahākāvya, is Bhaṭṭikāvya, which is simultaneously a narrative and a manual of grammatical instruction. It is believed by some to have been written by the 7th-century poet and grammarian Bhartṛhari.

== Prose writers ==
One prose writer was Subandhu (5th or 7th century CE?), author of Vāsavadattā, a romantic tale. Another was Bāṇabhaṭṭa, also called Bāṇa (7th century CE), author of Kādambarī, a romantic novel, and of Harṣacarita, a biography written in poetic prose.

Another well-known writer of the period was Daṇḍin (7th–8th century CE), who, in addition to poetry, wrote the Kāvyādarśa, a discussion of poetics, and the Daśakumāracarita. (Note: "The Story of Ten Princes)

== Some examples of kāvya ==
=== Epics ===
- Rāmāyaṇa – Vālmīki
- Mahābhārata – Vyāsa
- Kumāra-sambhava – Kālidāsa
- Buddha-carita – Aśva-ghoṣa
- Raghu-vaṃśa – Kālidāsa
- Madhurā-vijaya – Gaṅgā-devī
- Kṛṣṇa-vilāsa – Sukumāra
- Vikramāṅka-deva-carita – Bilhaṇa
- Śiva-līlārṇava – Nīlakaṇṭha-dīkṣita
- Kirātārjunīya – Bhāravi
- Śiśupāla-vadha – Māgha
- Naiṣadhīya-carita – Śrī-harṣa
- Jānakī-pariṇaya – Cakra-kavi
- Raghunāthābhyudaya – Rāma-bhadrāmbā
- Gāṅgāvataraṇa – Nīlakaṇṭha-dīkṣita
- Daśāvatāra-carita – Kṣemendra
- Pūrva-purāṇa – Jina-sena
- Rukmiṇīśa-vijaya – Vādi-rāja
- Dharma-śarmābhyudaya – Hari-candra
- Bāla-bhārata – Amara-candra
- Śrīkaṇṭha-carita – Maṅkha
- Rāma-carita – Abhinanda
- Jānakī-haraṇa – Kumāra-dāsa
- Yādavābhyudaya – Vedānta-deśika
- Yudhiṣṭhira-vijaya – Vāsudeva
- Rāvaṇa-vadha – Bhaṭṭi
- Kapphiṇābhyudaya – Śiva-svāmī
- Hara-vijaya – Ratnākara
- Rāghava-pāṇḍavīya – Kavi-rāja

=== Plays ===
- Ūru-bhaṅga – Bhāsa
- Svapna-vāsavadatta – Bhāsa
- Matta-vilāsa-prahasana – Mahendra-varmā
- Bhagavadajjukīya – Mahendra-varmā
- Mṛcchakaṭika – Śūdraka
- Kunda-mālā – Diṅnāga
- Mālavikāgnimitra – Kālidāsa
- Ratnāvalī – Harṣa-vardhana
- Vikramorvaśīya – Kālidāsa
- Abhijñāna-śākuntala – Kālidāsa
- Nāgānanda – Harṣa-vardhana
- Prabodha-candrodaya – Kṛṣṇa-miśra
- Uttara-rāma-carita – Bhava-bhūti
- Veṇī-saṃhāra – Bhaṭṭa-nārāyaṇa
- Mudrā-rākṣasa – Viśākha-datta
- Padma-prābhṛtaka – Śūdraka
- Pāda-tāḍitaka – Śyāmilaka
- Pratijñā-yaugandharāyaṇa – Bhāsa
- Hāsya-cūḍāmaṇi – Vatsa-rāja
- Karpūra-carita-bhāṇa – Vatsa-rāja
- Bāla-carita – Bhāsa
- Avimāraka – Bhāsa
- Āścarya-cūḍāmaṇi – Śakti-bhadra
- Priya-darśikā – Harṣa-vardhana
- Karṇa-sundarī – Bilhaṇa
- Tāpasa-vatsa-rāja – Māyu-rāja
- Naiṣadhānanda – Kṣemīśvara
- Viddha-śālabhañjikā – Rāja-śekhara
- Laṭaka-melaka – Śaṅkha-dhara
- Hāsyārṇava – Jagadīśa
- Prasanna-rāghava – Jaya-deva
- Mahāvīra-carita – Bhava-bhūti
- Mālatī-mādhava – Bhava-bhūti
- Hanumannāṭaka
- Ubhayābhisārikā – Vara-ruci
- Dhūrta-viṭa-saṃvāda – Īśvara-datta
- Anargha-rāghava – Murāri
- Bāla-rāmāyaṇa – Rāja-śekhara
- Saṅkalpa-sūryodaya – Vedānta-deśika

=== Stories and fables ===
- Pañca-tantra – Viṣṇu-śarmā
- Hitopadeśa – Nārāyaṇa-paṇḍita
- Siṃhāsana-dvātriṃśikā
- Vetāla-pañcaviṃśati – Jambhala-datta
- Jātaka-mālā – Ārya-śūra
- Bhoja-prabandha – Ballāḻa
- Śuka-saptati – Cintā-maṇi
- Puruṣa-parīkṣā – Vidyā-pati
- Prabandha-koṣa – Rāja-śekhara
- Prabandha-cintāmaṇi – Meru-tuṅga

=== Prose works ===
- Daśa-kumāra-carita – Daṇḍī
- Kādambarī – Bāṇa-bhaṭṭa
- Harṣa-carita – Bāṇa-bhaṭṭa
- Tilaka-mañjarī – Dhana-pāla
- Vāsava-dattā – Subandhu

=== Campū ===
- Rāmāyaṇa-campū – Bhoja
- Nīlakaṇṭha-vijaya-campū – Nīlakaṇṭha-dīkṣita
- Viśva-guṇādarśa-campū – Veṅkaṭādhvarī
- Bhārata-campū – Ananta-bhaṭṭa
- Varadāmbikā-pariṇaya-campū – Tirumalāmbā
- Yātrā-prabandha – Samara-puṅgava-dīkṣita
- Nṛsiṃha-campū – Daivajña-sūrya
- Pārijātāpaharaṇa-campū – Śeṣa-śrī-kṛṣṇa
- Udaya-sundarī-kathā – Soḍḍhala
- Yaśastilaka-campū – Soma-deva-sūri
- Nala-campū – Trivikrama-bhaṭṭa

=== Short poems ===
- Ṛtu-saṃhāra – Kālidāsa
- Nīti-dviṣaṣṭikā – Sundara-pāṇḍya
- Nīti-śataka – Bhartṛhari
- Vairāgya-śataka – Bhartṛhari
- Amaru-śataka – Amaruka
- Sabhā-rañjana – Nīlakaṇṭha-dīkṣita
- Kali-viḍambana – Nīlakaṇṭha-dīkṣita
- Vairāgya-śataka – Nīlakaṇṭha-dīkṣita
- Śānti-vilāsa – Nīlakaṇṭha-dīkṣita
- Megha-dūta – Kālidāsa
- Bhāminī-vilāsa – Jagannātha
- Gīta-govinda – Jaya-deva
- Bhallaṭa-śataka – Bhallaṭa
- Anyāpadeśa-śataka – Nīlakaṇṭha-dīkṣita
- Mahiṣa-śataka – Vāñcheśvara
- Dṛṣṭānta-kalikā-śataka – Kusuma-deva
- Cāṇakya-nīti – Cāṇakya
- Gumānī-śataka – Gumānī-kavi
- Śānti-śataka – Śilhaṇa
- Haṃsa-sandeśa – Vedānta-deśika
- Kokila-sandeśa – Uddaṇḍa
- Āryā-sapta-śatī – Govardhana
- Tīrtha-prabandha – Vādi-rāja
- Pārśvābhyudaya – Jina-sena
- Sahṛdayānanda – Śrī-kṛṣṇānanda
- Subhāṣita-kaustubha – Veṅkaṭādhvarī
- Subhāṣita-nīvī – Vedānta-deśika

=== Devotional hymns ===
- Śivānanda-laharī – Śaṅkarācārya
- Śrī-kṛṣṇa-karṇāmṛta – Līlā-śuka
- Gaṅgā-laharī – Jagannātha
- Śivotkarṣa-mañjarī – Nīlakaṇṭha-dīkṣita
- Saundarya-laharī – Śaṅkarācārya
- Sudhā-laharī – Jagannātha
- Varada-rāja-stava – Appayya-dīkṣita
- Ānanda-sāgara-stava – Nīlakaṇṭha-dīkṣita
- Mūka-pañcaśatī – Mūka-kavi
- Pādukā-sahasra – Vedānta-deśika
- Lakṣmī-nṛsiṃha-karāvalambana-stotra – Śaṅkarācārya
- Devyaparādha-kṣamāpaṇa-stotra – Śaṅkarācārya
- Śiva-mahimnaḥ stotra – Puṣpa-danta
- Śyāmalā-daṇḍaka
- Śiva-pādādi-keśānta-stotra – Śaṅkarācārya
- Viṣṇu-pādādi-keśānta-stotra – Śaṅkarācārya
- Gopāla-viṃśati – Vedānta-deśika
- Karuṇā-laharī – Jagannātha
- Lakṣmī-laharī – Jagannātha
- Rāma-karṇāmṛta – Rāmabhadra-dīkṣita
- Rāmāṣṭa-prāsa – Rāmabhadra-dīkṣita
- Raṅgarāja-stava – Parāśara-bhaṭṭa
- Garuḍa-pañcāśat – Vedānta-deśika
- Stuti-kusumāñjali – Jagaddhara
- Caṇḍī-śataka – Bāṇa-bhaṭṭa
- Sūrya-śataka – Mayūra
- Nārāyaṇīya – Nārāyaṇa-bhaṭṭatiri
- Devī-śataka – Ānanda-vardhana
- Īśvara-śataka – Īśvara-kavi
- Lakṣmī-sahasra – Veṅkaṭādhvarī

=== Satires and verse narratives ===
- Darpa-dalana – Kṣemendra
- Kuṭṭinī-mata – Dāmodara
- Deśopadeśa – Kṣemendra
- Kalā-vilāsa – Kṣemendra
- Narma-mālā – Kṣemendra
- Rāmāyaṇa-mañjarī – Kṣemendra
- Bhārata-mañjarī – Kṣemendra
- Kathā-sarit-sāgara – Soma-deva
- Rāja-taraṅgiṇī – Kalhaṇa
- Sevya-sevakopadeśa – Kṣemendra
- Cāru-caryā – Kṣemendra
- Bṛhatkathā-mañjarī – Kṣemendra
- Caturvarga-saṅgraha – Kṣemendra
- Deśopadeśa – Kṣemendra
- Samaya-mātṛkā – Kṣemendra
- Bhikṣāṭana-kāvya – Utprekṣā-vallabha

=== Anthologies ===
- Samayocita-padya-mālikā
- Subhāṣitāvalī – Vallabha-deva
- Subhāṣita-ratna-koṣa – Vidyākara
- Subhāṣita-ratna-bhāṇḍāgāra
- Subhāṣita-sudhā-nidhi – Sāyaṇācārya
- Padyāvalī – Rūpa-gosvāmī
- Śārṅgadhara-paddhati – Śārṅgadhara
- Sūkti-muktāvalī – Jalhaṇa
- Sadukti-karṇāmṛta – Śrīdhara-dāsa

=== Modern works ===
- Vātsalya-rasāyana (short poem) – Sridhar Bhaskar Warnekar
- Kāma-śuddhi (short play) – V Raghavan
- Kālidāsa-rahasya (short poem) – Sridhar Bhaskar Warnekar
- Nāṭya-pañcagavya (collection of short plays) – Abhiraj Rajendra Mishra
- Pañca-kulyā (collection of short poems) – Abhiraj Rajendra Mishra
- Prekṣaṇaka-trayī (collection of short plays) – V Raghavan
- Candra-sena (play) – S D Joshi and Vighna Hari Deo
- Laharī-daśaka (collection of short poems) – Radhavallabh Tripathi
- Śiva-rājyodaya (epic) – Sridhar Bhaskar Warnekar
- Anārkalī (play) – V Raghavan
- Megha-prati-sandeśa (short poem) – Mandikal Rama Shastri
- Kaṇṭakāñjali (satire) – K S Arjunwadkar
- Vicchitti-vātāyanī (collection of verses) – Jagannath Pathak
- Kāpiśāyinī (collection of short poems) – Jagannath Pathak
- Parīvāha (collection of short poems) – Balram Shukla
- Nipuṇa-prāghuṇaka (play) – Shankar Rajaraman
- Bhārāvatāra-stava (devotional hymn) – Shankar Rajaraman
- Mṛtkūṭa (short poem) – Bhaskaracharya Tripathi
- Pratijñā-kauṭilya (play) – Jaggu Vakulabhushana
- Citra-naiṣadha (short poem)– Shankar Rajaraman
- Sītā-rāvaṇa-saṃvāda-jharī (short poem) – C Rama Shastri and Sitarama Shastri
- Lokālaṅkāra-paṅkīya (satire) – S Jagannatha
- Asta-vyasta (play) – S Jagannatha
- Kāvya-kalāpa (collection of short poems) – Jaggu Shingararya
- Abhirāja-saptaśatī (collection of short poems) – Abhiraj Rajendra Mishra
- Abhirāja-sāhasrī (collection of short poems) – Abhiraj Rajendra Mishra
- Nāṭya-nava-ratna (collection of short plays) – Abhiraj Rajendra Mishra
- Rūpa-rudrīya (collection of short plays) – Abhiraj Rajendra Mishra
- Akiñcana-kāñcana (play) – Abhiraj Rajendra Mishra
- Mīrā-laharī (short poem) – Kshama Rao
- Mṛgāṅka-dūta (short poem) – Abhiraj Rajendra Mishra
- Kavitā-putrikā-jāti (collection of short poems) – Balram Shukla
- Pratijñā-śāntanava (short play) – Jaggu Vakulabhushana
- Maṇi-haraṇa (short play) – Jaggu Vakulabhushana
- Apratima-pratima (short play) – Jaggu Vakulabhushana
- Prasanna-kāśyapa (short play) – Jaggu Vakulabhushana
- Vivekānanda-vijaya (play) – Sridhar Bhaskar Warnekar
- Śatālaṅkāra-kṛṣṇa-śataka (short poem) – H V Nagaraja Rao
- Vyājokti-muktāvalī (short poem) – Mahalinga Shastri
- Bhramara-dūta (short poem) – Mahalinga Shastri
- Adbhutāṃśuka (play) – Jaggu Vakulabhushana
- Madhurāñjali (collection of poems) – Galagali Ramacharya
- Adbhuta-dūta (epic) – Jaggu Vakulabhushana
- Laghu-raghu (short poem) – Bhaskaracharya Tripathi
- Devī-dānavīya (short poem) – Shankar Rajaraman

== See also ==
- Sanskrit literature
- Mahākāvya

== Bibliography ==
- Kavya. (2007). Encyclopædia Britannica Online.
- Gonda, Jan. A History of Indian Literature, Otto Harrasowitz, Wiesbaden.
- Keith, Arthur Berriedale (1928). A History of Sanskrit Literature. (Oxford University Press).
- Macdonell, Arthur Anthony (1900), "Kāvya or court epic" , A History of Sanskrit Literature, New York: D. Appleton and company
- Monier-Williams, Monier. A Sanskrit-English Dictionary. London: Oxford Clarendon Press.
- Warder, A.K., (1989). Indian Kāvya Literature, South Asia Books.
- Winternitz, M. A History of Indian Literature. Oriental books, New Delhi, 1972
