= Dandin (audio platform) =

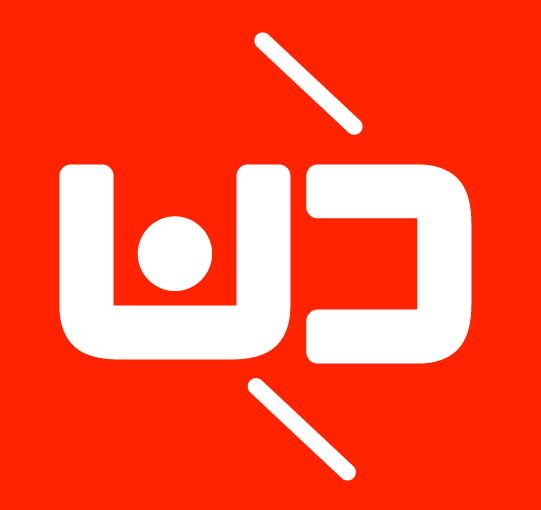
- Industry: Music streaming
- Founded: 2013; 13 years ago
- Headquarters: Cairo, Egypt
- Website: dandin.me

Dandin (Arabic: دندن ) is a music platform and sound-hosting website for the Middle East. Established in Egypt in October 2013, Dandin is a platform that focusses on highlighting emerging talent from the region.

== History ==
Dandin.me was launched on October 10, 2013, as an independent audio platform based in Egypt. It invites users to upload recordings in different sections, such as music, comedy, podcasts, politics and poetry.

== Origin of Name ==
Dandin is an Egyptian-Arabic slang term for humming and being a Middle Eastern platform it hosts output from artists originating only from that region.

== Sound types and genres ==
The platform hosts a variety of sounds derived from what is labelled the independent or alternative scene in the Middle East. Besides music it also hosts poetry, comedy sketches, political rants and storytelling.
