= Dashakumaracharita =

Sanskrit prose romance

The Narrative of Ten Young Men
- Author: Attributed to Daṇḍin
- Original title: दशकुमारचरित (Dashakumaracharita)
- Language: Sanskrit

Dashakumaracharita (The narrative of ten young men, IAST: Daśa-kumāra-Carita, Devanagari: दशकुमारचरित) is a prose romance in Sanskrit, attributed to Dandin (दण्डी), written in the seventh to eighth centuries CE.

It describes the adventures of ten young men, the Kumaras, who are the sons of princes and royal ministers.

The seventh chapter of the Dashakumaracharita contains a specimen of lipogrammatic writing (a species of constrained writing). At the beginning of the chapter, Mantragupta is called upon to relate his adventures. However, during the previous night of vigorous sex, his lips have been nibbled several times by his beloved; as a result, they are now swollen, making it painful for him to close them. Thus, throughout his narrative, he is compelled to refrain from using any labial consonants (प,फ,ब,भ,म).

== The text ==
Most extant texts of Dashakumaracharita are composed of

1. Pūrvapīthikā (पूर्वपीठिका, Prologue) divided into 5 chapters (Ucchvāsa, उच्छ्वास);
2. The Dashakumaracharita proper, divided into 8 chapters;
3. The Uttarapīthikā (उत्तरपीठिका, Epilogue), without any subdivisions.

Some text at the beginning and the end of Dashakumaracharita proper has been lost; thus it contains only eight of the ten narratives, and furthermore, the stories of Rajavahan and Vishruta are incomplete. The 1st and the 3rd parts seem to have been added later by various authors (some of whom have tried to mimic the style of the original); indeed, there are several disparate versions for these parts in existence.

The plot, as described below, almost makes a coherent whole. However, as mentioned above, it comes from the hands of multiple authors writing in possibly different centuries. There are small discrepancies between the three parts; e.g., the patronage of Pramati as described in the prologue disagrees with the one in Dashakumaracharita proper.

=== The Kumaras ===
The ten Kumaras are named in the first chapter of the prologue as follows:

1. Rājavāhana (राजवाहन)
2. Sōmadatta (सोमदत्त)
3. Pushpōdbhava (पुष्पोद्भव)
4. Apahāravarmana (अपहारवर्मन)
5. Upahāravarmana (उपहारवर्मन)
6. Arthapāla (अर्थपाल)
7. Pramati (प्रमति)
8. Mitragupta (मित्रगुप्त)
9. Mantragupta (मंत्रगुप्त)
10. Vishruta (विश्रुत).

=== Prologue ===
The first two chapters of the prologue form the frame story.

==== I ====
King Rajahamsa of Magadha is defeated in a war by the rival King Manasara of Malwa, and thence retires into the Vindhya forest together with his ministers. During his sojourn, he and his ministers respectively sire sons. Several other young men are brought to his dwelling due to various incidents (e.g., one is rescued from a river, another from a tiger, and still another wanders off from a battlefield during a skirmish). These altogether make the ten Kumaras. The men are schooled in several disciplines such as law, grammar, astrology, music, medicine and warfare.

==== II ====
The men are dispatched together by the King for a Digvijaya (world conquest). Prince Rajavahana comes across a Matanga Brahmana. The latter lures him into a scheme to conquer Patala (the netherworld), and the two disappear into the earth through a chasm. After the scheme is accomplished (and the Brahmana marries the daughter of the King of Asuras), Rajavahana returns to earth, only to find that his friends have all scattered away. Eventually, the young men will meet again and relate their adventures, which will form the body of the present work.

Rajavahana travels to Ujjain, where he meets Somadatta. The latter begins his narrative.

==== III ====
Somadatta had gone to Ujjain in search of the lost Prince, where King Mattakala has usurped King Viraketu. Somadatta finds a jewel near a river, and then gives it to a destitute Brahmana in charity. The latter has him imprisoned as a jewel thief. Somadatta discovers that his fellow prisoners are loyal to the minister of King Viraketu. They break free from the prison, raise an army and overthrow the usurper. The old king is restored to the throne and Somadatta marries his daughter. At the end of this narrative, Rajavahana and Somadatta accidentally meet Pushpodbhava and ask him to relate his adventures. The latter begins his narrative.

==== IV ====
Pushpodbhava saves a man falling from a cliff, who turns out to be his father, who had tried to commit suicide after becoming despondent for having lost his family. Shortly afterwards, he saves a woman from throwing herself in fire due to grief; this turns out to be his mother. Later Pushpodbhava acquires vast wealth by applying magical collyrium to his eyes to detect subterranean riches. He becomes enamoured of the beautiful damsel Balachandrika, who is facing unwelcome advances from a certain Daruvarma. Pushpodbhava spreads a report that Balachandrika is possessed by a Yaksha. He accompanies Balachandrika to Daruvarma's apartment disguised as her female attendant, kills him when he tries to sport with her, and blames the death on the Yaksha. He then marries Balachandrika.

==== V ====
Rajavahana relates his adventures. He had gone to the town of Avanti where he became enamoured of Princess Avantisundari (the daughter of Manasara, his father's enemy). Meanwhile, Manasara has temporarily abdicated his kingdom to practice penance and left Chandavarman in charge. Rajavahana and Avantisundari are married by a friendly conjurer who makes Chandavarman believe that the wedding ceremony is a delusion. The couple retires into a private chamber for amorous sport.

=== The Dashakumaracharita proper ===
In Chapter I, the text begins in the middle of Rajavahana's story.

==== I ====
The lovers are discovered by royal attendants and reported to Chandavarman, who becomes furious, arrests Rajavahana and imprisons him in a wooden cage. Then Chandavarman launches a military campaign against his rival King Simhavarman (carrying along the wooden cage onto the battlefield) and vanquishes him. Meanwhile, a message arrives from Manasara commanding that Rajavahana be executed. As he is about to be trampled to death by an elephant, the chain tied to his feet falls off and is revealed to be a nymph who had previously been cursed into assuming that form. Meanwhile, Chandavarman is killed by a thief. Several military allies of Simhavarman arrive at the scene, amongst whom all of Rajavahana's remaining missing friends are found. Now Apaharavarman is asked to relate his adventures.

==== II ====
Apaharavarman travelled to the city of Champa, where he became a gamester and a burglar and helped the maiden Kulapalika to gain her lover by enriching her with burgled wealth. A devious prostitute named Kamanamanjari had defrauded several people in that city. Apaharavarman falls in love with her sister Ragamanjari, tricks Kamanamanjari into giving back her money to her former paramours, and marries the sister. Later he rashly attacks a soldier and is imprisoned. The jailor Kantaka uses his services to dig a tunnel out of the prison into the royal palace since Karnataka is enamoured of the princess and wishes to visit her in secret. However, Apaharavarman kills the jailor and escapes through the tunnel.

==== III ====
Next, Upaharavarman relates his adventures. He had returned to his own country Videha in search of the Prince. He meets his old nurse who informs him that his father's kingdom has been usurped by King Vikatavarman. He entices the king into a trap to perform a magical rite in order to exchange his (the King's) old and shrivelled body for a new one and succeeds in killing him. The kingdom is restored to his father.

==== IV ====
Arthapala narrates his adventures. He had gone to Kashi where he heard the plight of Kampala (his father, and a former royal minister). The latter was sentenced to death by the evil King Simhaghosha. While Kampala is being led to his execution, Arthapala drops a poisonous snake on his body and makes him fall down senseless. The seemingly dead body is carried away and later restored to life by Arthapala (who knows anti-poison charms). Later Arthapala overthrows Simhaghosha and marries the princess Manikarnika.

==== V ====
Pramati relates his adventures. While travelling through the Vindhya mountains, he fell asleep under a tree. During the night he was transported by a nymph to the palace of the princess Navamalika, with whom he fell in love. In order to gain the princess, he hatches a plan in consort with a Brahmana (whom he has met at a cock-fight). The Brahmana dresses Pramati in female garb, and leaves 'her' in the protection of the King (Navamalika's father) telling the King that 'she' is the Brahmana's daughter. While in the palace, Pramati wins the princess's affection, but then absconds and joins the Brahmana. The two approach the King, and the Brahmana presents Pramati as his prospective son-in-law who has come to claim his future wife. The King is, of course, unable to produce her, and is forced to give up his own daughter in order to propitiate the Brahmana (who otherwise threatens to immolate himself). Thus Pramati is wedded to Navamalika.

==== VI ====
Mitragupta relates his adventures. He had travelled to the Suhma country, where, by the grace of the goddess Durga, the king had obtained two children, a son (Bhimadhanva) and a daughter (Kandukavati). The goddess had stipulated that the son should be subordinate to the daughter's husband. The princess chooses Mitragupta as her husband in a public festival. This infuriates Bhimadhanva (who resents being subordinated to a stranger) and he throws Mitragupta into the sea. He is rescued by a passing vessel of Yavanas who want to hold him as a slave. However, at the same time, their ship is attacked by Bhimadhanva's party. Mitragupta helps the Yavanas in repelling the attack and wins their favour. The ship drifts off to an island and Mitragupta lands on the shore. There he meets a Rakshasa who threatens to eat him unless he answers the following four questions: 1. What is cruel by nature? 2. What ensures the happiness of a householder? 3. What is love? and 4. What is the best means of achieving difficult things? He answers 1. The heart of a woman, 2. The virtues of a wife, 3. Imagination and 4. Ability. He illustrates his answers by four stories (told in full in the text). The Rakshasa is appeased by these answers. Just then, another Rakshasa is seen forcibly carrying the princess Kandukavati through the air. She is rescued and then married to Mitragupta.

==== VII ====
Mantragupta relates his adventures, in a speech which is entire niroshthya (निरोष्ठ्य, i.e., without labial consonants). One night he sees that a Siddha (sorcerer) is about to sacrifice the princess Kanakalekha of Kalinga in order to obtain miraculous powers. He kills the sorcerer and rescues the princess who falls in love with him. The sorcerer's slave (a ghost) is overjoyed to be freed from his master and clandestinely carries Mantragupta into the palace, where he lives with the princess in the ladies chambers. One day, as the king of Kalinga (and the princess), is away on a hunting expedition, their entire retinue is surprised and made captive by the rival king Jayasimha. The latter wishes to possess the princess, who resists his advances. In order to rescue her, Mantragupta dresses in the rags and severed hair of the sorcerer and presents himself as an ascetic possessing magical powers. He convinces Jayasimha to bathe in a presumably enchanted lake which would frighten away the Yaksha who has presumably possessed the princess. Mantragupta hides himself in a cavity along the bank of the lake and drowns Jayasimha when the latter enters. He issues forth as the King (who has acquired a new lustrous body), frees the old king and marries the princess.

==== VIII ====
Vishruta begins to relate his adventures. While wandering through the Vindhya forest, he comes across a young boy accompanied by an old servant. The boy is the prince of Vidarbha whose kingdom has been usurped. This had forced the queen Vasundhara to take refuge (with her son and daughter) with Mitravarma, who proved to be a treacherous ally. Thus the queen is compelled to send away the boy to safety. Vishruta takes upon himself to help the boy. He sends back the servant and instructs him to spread a false report that the young prince is dead. He also sends a poisonous garland to the queen which she uses to kill Mitravarma. Then Vishruta arrives in the city with the young boy, restores the kingdom and meets the queen in a temple of Durga. The boy is restored to his rightful throne, and Vishruta marries the princess.

The text breaks off in the middle of Vishruta's story.

=== Epilogue ===
Later Vishruta restores the kingdom of Vidarbha to King Bhaskarvarman by leading an expedition against the usurper Vasantabhanu.

After the narratives have ended, a messenger arrives from the old King Rajahamsa (father of Prince Rajavahana). The King had been very mournful when the Kumaras had scattered away, but was comforted by a seer who assured him that they would return after sixteen years. This interval has now come to pass. The Kumaras return with an army to Ujjain, and succeed in defeating King Manasara. Various kingdoms are distributed to the Kumaras, which they govern with justice and happiness to all.

== Authorship and relationship with the Avantisundarī ==
There has been extensive debate about the authorship of the Dashakumaracharita. The author is traditionally regarded as the poet and grammarian Daṇḍin who composed the Kavyadarsha, a manual on poetry and rhetoric, and according to Yigal Bronner, 'there is now a wide consensus that a single Daṇḍin authored all these works at the Pallava court in Kāñcī around the end of the seventh century'.

In the early twentieth century, Agashe doubted this attribution on the grounds that the two works differ very widely in style and tone. Since a poet Dandin (presumably distinct from a prose writer) is also mentioned in sundry ancient Indian texts, he is led to conjecture the existence of at least three distinct Dandins. Since Dandin (literally, a staff-bearer) is also a common adjective for ascetics or religious mendicants, Wilson doubted whether it was the author's proper name at all.

On the other hand, in the mid twentieth century Kale accepted that Kavyadarsha and Dashakumaracharita had been written by the same person. On the basis of textual evidence from the Dashakumaracharita, he opines that the author must have lived earlier than the Muslim invasion of India, i.e., before the 11th century. Moreover, since the Kavyadarsha refers to the Prakrit poem Setubandha (सेतुबंध) composed in the 5th century, he is led to 6th-8th century as the most probable time of composition. (This remains in some tension with the fact that Dashakumaracharita is not referred to by any other text until the 10th century. There is also a conflicting tradition, generally considered unreliable, which makes Dandin a contemporary of Kalidasa.)

=== Relationship with the Avantisundarī ===
Another work attributed to Daṇḍin is the Avantisundarī or Avantisundarīkathā (The Story of the Beautiful Lady from Avanti). Like the Dashakumaracharita this is in prose, but is even more fragmentarily preserved: the two surviving manuscripts break off early in the text. A later Sanskrit poem, the Avantisundarīkathāsāra (Gist of the Story of the Beautiful Lady from Avanti) seems to have summarised the full story, and its surviving portion covers more of the story, and more again is preserved in a thirteenth-century Telugu translation. These texts overlap significantly with the stories in the Dashakumaracharita. Precisely how the Dashakumaracharita and the Avantisundarī originally related is unclear. Although many have argued that the two must have been composed by different people, the Avantisundarī too is 'unmistakably ascribed to Daṇḍin by its colophons and by later sources'.

Several eminent scholars now believe on stylistic and other grounds that, as suggested by the verse summary and its Telugu translation, both the Avantisundarī and the Daśakumāracarita originally formed a single massive prose work that was broken up at a relatively early age in its transmission; another view is that the two represent separate stages in the life and work of the same author.

== Translations, adaptations and commentaries ==
In the 13th century CE, the Telugu poet Ketana composed an adaptation of the Daśakumāracarita into Telugu. In the 14th century CE, the poet Cauṇḍarasa (also known as Cauṇḍarāja, not to be confused with the Jain poet of the same name) wrote a Kannada version of the work.

Editions of the original Sanskrit text have been published in modern times by Agashe, Godbole and Parab, Kale, and Wilson. The work has been translated into English by Haksar, Jacob, Kale, Onians, and Ryder. In particular, the edition by Kale includes the original in Sanskrit, a literal English translation, as well as an extensive commentary on the stylistic and historical aspects of the text. In her translation of the lipogrammatic chapter, Onians omits the labial roman letters 'b', 'm' and 'p'. (E.g., she uses the circumlocution 'honey-creator' instead of 'bumblebee'). There is also a translation into German by Mayer.

Critical commentaries on the text have been written by, inter alia, Ghanashyama, Gupta and Pankaj. A more extensive bibliography may be found in Onians.

== Historical research ==
The Dashakumaracharita has been used to examine the creation of the Ajanta Caves, interpreting it as an extended metaphoric telling of the 5th-century fall of the Vākāṭaka dynasty, and a comparison to the 7th-century Pallava dynasty, which is the period that the work is conventionally dated to. Spink argues that the work has an essentially historical core, almost readable as a roman a clef, which is an accurate account of the Vākāṭaka fall and that Dandin (or one of the Dandins) had a personal, perhaps familial, connection to the events in the 5th century. Evidence from the text has also been used to establish the spread of the worship of Vindhyavasini in the period.

== Criticism and analysis ==
The Dashakumaracharita has been compared to the Spanish genre of picaresque, linking the settings and drawing parallels 6th-century disorder of India to the disorder of Spain in the late mediaeval period. It has also been noted that the Dashakumaracharita, while fantastic, has realism that is not present in contemporary prestigious works, and involves thieves, prostitutes and other less exalted members of society. Dandin may have borrowed major themes from the Brihatkatha. It has been said to focus on "how people are, rather than how they should be".

== Bibliography ==
Sanskrit text

- Wilson, H. H. (1846). The Dasa kumara carita: or Adventures of ten princes. London: Society for the Publication of Oriental Texts.
- N.B. Godabole and K. P. Parab, ed. (1906). The Dasakumaracharita of Dandin: with three commentaries. Bombay: Nirnaya Sagara Press.
- Agashe, G. J. (1919). The Dasakumaracarita of Dandin. Bombay Sanskrit Series.

Translations

- Jacob, P. W. (1873). Hindoo Tales: Or, the Adventures of Ten Princes; Freely Translated from the Sanscrit of the Dasakumaracharitam. London : Strahan & Co.
- Mayer, Johann Jakob (1902). Dacakumaracaritam; die Abenteuer der zehn Prinzen (translation into German). Leipzig Lotus-verlag.
- Ryder, A.W. (1927). Dandin's Dasha-kumara-charita: The ten princes (translation into English). University of Chicago Press.
- Kale, M.R. (1966). The Dasakumaracarita of Dandin (with Various Readings, A Literal English Translation, Explanatory and Critical Notes, and an Exhaustive Introduction) (4th ed.). Delhi: Motilal Banarsidass.
- Haksar, A.N.D. (1995). Tales of the Ten Princes (Dasa Kumara Charitam) (translation into English). New Delhi: Penguin Books, India.
- Onians, Isabelle (2005). What Ten Young Men Did (translation into English with facing Romanized Sanskrit text). New York: Clay Sanskrit Library.

Analysis

- Gupta, D.K. (1972). Society and culture in the time of Dandin. Delhi: Meharchand Lachhmandas Publications.
- Pankaj, N. Q. (2002). Dasakumaracarita: a cultural study. Kala Prakashan.
