= Kumārasambhava =

Sanskrit epic poem by Kalidasa

A 1751 CE manuscript of Kumārasambhava in Newar script from Nepal

Kumārasambhavam (Sanskrit: कुमारसम्भवम् ) (transl. - "The Birth of Kumāra") is an epic poem by Kālidāsa. It is widely regarded as the finest work of Kalidasa as well as the greatest kāvya poem in Classical Sanskrit. The style of description of spring set the standard for nature metaphors pervading many centuries of Indian literary tradition. Kumārasaṃbhavam narrates the birth of Kumāra (Kārtikeya), the son of Shiva (Śiva) and Pārvatī (Umā). The period of composition is uncertain, although Kalidasa is thought to have lived in the 5th century.

Memorial statue of the text Kumarsammbham depicting Lord Kartikeya at the premises of the Kalidas Dih at Uchchaith in the Mithila region of Bihar in India.

A fierce debate has raged over the question as to whether the whole of the seventeen cantos came was penned by Kālidasa. Vitthala Śastrin, who in 1866, published Cantos VIII to XVII in The Paṇḍit, took them as genuine work of Kālidasa while scholars like Hermann Jacobi took Cantos IX to XVII as a later interpolation. Stylistic inferiority of these cantos, rarity of manuscripts, silence on the part of early commentators and lack of citation in Alaṃkārasutra are often presented as reasons for rejecting this latter cantos of the poem.

Furthermore, scholars have rejected and criticised Canto VIII, arguing that it is blasphemous for a renowned Śaiva poet to depict the romantic pleasures shared by Shiva and Parvati, the divine parents of the universe. Legend say that Kālidasa could not complete his epic Kumārasambhavam because he was cursed by the goddess Parvati, for obscene descriptions of her conjugal life with Shiva in the eighth canto. The English renderings of these Sanskrit plays tend to avoid erotic and explicit aspects due to moral tastes of modern audience. The play depicts Kālidasa as a court poet of Candragupta who faces a trial on the insistence of a priest and some other moralists of his time.

== Contents ==
Kumārasambhavam literally means "The Birth of Kumāra". This epic entails Sringara rasa, the rasa of love, romance, and eroticism, more than Vira rasa (the rasa of heroism). Tārakāsura, an asura (demon) was blessed that he could be killed by none other than Shiva's son. However, Shiva had won over Kama, the god of love. Parvati performed great tapas (spiritual penance) to win the love of Shiva. Consequently, Shiva and Parvati's son Kartikeya was born to restore the glory of Indra, king of the devas.

=== Canto I (Uma's Nativity) ===
Then was it sweet, as days flew by, to trace
The dawning charm of every infant grace,
Even as the crescent Moons their glory pour More full,
more lovely than the eve before.

As yet the maiden was unknown to fame,
And Mountain-lady was her only name;
But when her mother, filled with anxious care
At her stern penance, cried Forbear ! Forbear!
To a new title was the warning turned,
And Uma was the name the maiden earned.

— Umotpattiḥ (उमोत्पत्तिः) I.25-26, Trans. Ralph T. H. Griffith

The poet begins by describing the Himalaya, rightfully known as the King of all mountain ranges. From his wife Mena, he has a son named Mainaka and a daughter named Parvati, who was Sati in her previous life, the daughter of Daksha and wife of Shiva. The poem then details Parvati's childhood and her emerging youth. Once she reaches marriageable age, the sage Narada visits the Himalaya and predicts that she will win Shiva as her husband. Trusting this prophecy, Himalaya does not take much action regarding her marriage. Meanwhile, after losing his wife Sati, Shiva has retreated to a peak in the Himalaya to practice penance. Upon learning this, Himalaya decides that his daughter and her two companions should approach Shiva to pay their respects.

=== Canto II (The Address to Brahma) ===
When that great warrior battles for his life,
O, who may conquer in the deadly strife,
Save one of Siva's seed?

He is the Light, Reigning supreme beyond the depths of night;
Nor I, nor Vishnu, his full power may share,
Lo, where he dwells in solitude and prayer!

— Brahmasākṣātkāraḥ (ब्रह्मसाक्षात्कारः) II.57-58, Trans. Ralph T. H. Griffith

Around this time, the gods in Heaven were troubled by the demon Taraka, prompting them to approach Brahma collectively to express their grievances. Taraka, having gained mastery over the three worlds through a boon from Brahma, had forced all the gods into his service, rendering even the powerful Indra powerless. The only one capable of defeating this demon was the son of Shiva. Since Shiva had no son, the gods needed to arrange for his son’s birth. Brahma suggests that Parvati, the daughter of the mountain Himalaya, would be the ideal partner for Shiva; if they could facilitate their marriage, the gods could achieve their goal.

=== Canto III (The Burning of Kama) ===
Then with strong effort, Siva lulled to rest,
The storm of passion in his troubled breast,
And seeks, with angry eyes that round him roll,
Whence came the tempest o'er his tranquil soul.

He looked, and saw the bold young Archer stand,
His bow bent ready in his skillful hand,
Drawn towards the eye— his shoulder well depressed,
And the left foot thrown forward as a rest.

— Madanadahanaḥ (मदनदहनः) III.69-70, Trans. Ralph T. H. Griffith

To inspire passion in the ascetic Shiva and persuade him to marry Parvati, Indra sends Kama, the god of Love. Accompanied by his friend Vasanta (the Vernal Season), Kama arrives where Shiva is meditating and Parvati is serving him. Upon his arrival, the trees and plants suddenly bloom, the earth dons a premature springtime beauty, and both animals and birds exhibit signs of love, even affecting the ascetics' ability to maintain their self-control. This sudden onset of spring and Parvati’s presence momentarily distract Shiva, but he quickly regains his focus. Realizing that Kama is behind this disturbance, he becomes furious and unleashes fire from his third eye, incinerating Kama into a pile of ashes. Alarmed by this unforeseen disaster, Himalaya takes his daughter to a safer location, while Shiva disappears, thwarting Indra's plan for the time being.

=== Canto IV (Rati's Lament) ===
And then those words that made me, oh, so blest —
"Dear love, thy home is in my faithful breast!"
Alas, sweet words, too blissful to be true,
Or how couldst thou have died, nor Rati perish too?

Yes, I will fly to thee, of thee bereft,
And leave this world which thou, my life, hast left—
Cold, gloomy, now this wretched world must be,
For all its pleasures came from only thee.

— Rativilāpaḥ (रतिविलापः) IV.9-10, Trans. Ralph T. H. Griffith

Rati, Kama's widow, witnessed her husband's tragic demise during his mission and now mourns deeply. She calls upon Vasanta to prepare a funeral pyre for her to immolate herself. As preparations begin, a voice from the celestial realm reassures her that her separation from Kama is temporary; when Shiva marries Parvati, he will grant Kama his physical form, allowing Rati to reunite with her husband.

=== Canto V (Uma's Reward) ===
The silver Moon on Siva's forehead shone,
While softly spake the God in gracious tone: —
"O gentle Maiden, wise and true of soul,
Lo, now I bend beneath thy sweet control!
Won by thy Penance, and thy holy vows,
Thy willing slave Siva before thee bows!"

He spake, and rushing through her languid frame
At his dear words returning vigour came;
She knew but this, that all her cares were o'er,
Her sorrows ended, she should weep no more!

— Tapaḥphalodayaḥ (तपःफलोदयः) V.86, Trans. Ralph T. H. Griffith

Parvati, who secretly loved Shiva and desired to marry him, felt deeply disappointed and decided to pursue austere penance to achieve her goal. After obtaining her parents' permission, she ascended a Himalayan peak, later named Gaurishikhara after her, where she rigorously practiced self-mortification, undeterred by the harshest forms of asceticism. Her efforts won Shiva’s affection, prompting him to visit her hermitage disguised as a young ascetic to test her commitment. He argued skillfully against her choice, highlighting Shiva's perceived flaws, such as his love for unpleasant things, his unattractive appearance, and his poverty, suggesting he was unsuitable for a refined woman like Parvati. However, she dismissed these criticisms, finding his flaws endearing. Through her maid, she communicated her lack of interest in the ascetic's arguments. At this, he revealed his true form and declared himself her servant. Overjoyed to see Shiva before her, Parvati felt immense happiness.

=== Canto VI (Uma's Espousals) ===
I seek the Mountain-Maiden as my bride,
Our hero Son shall tame the Demon's pride, —
Thus the Priest bids the holy Fire arise,
Struck from the wood to aid the Sacrifice.

Go, ask Himalaya for the lovely Maid,
Blest are those bridals which the Holy aid;
So shall more glorious honours gild my name,
And win the father yet a prouder fame.

— Umāpradānaḥ (उमाप्रदानः) VI.28-29, Trans. Ralph T. H. Griffith

Parvati requests Shiva to seek her father's formal approval for their marriage. Shiva sends the Seven Sages, accompanied by Vasishtha's wife Arundhati to the capital city of Oshadhiprastha, which they greatly admire. Upon their arrival, Himalaya greets them respectfully and inquires about their purpose. The sages share their mission, and Himalaya happily agrees, giving his consent. They set the wedding date for four days later and return to inform Shiva before heading back to their celestial abode.

=== Canto VII (Uma's Bridal) ===
Now have they left the wedded Pair alone,
And Siva takes her hand within his own
To lead his darling to the bridal bower,
Decked with bright gold and all her sumptuous dower.
She blushes sweetly as her maidens there
Look with arch smiles and glances on the Pair,
And for one moment, while the damsels stay,
From him she loves turns her dear face away.

— Umāpariṇayaḥ (उमापरिणयः) VII.94-95, Trans. Ralph T. H. Griffith

The city of Himalaya is festively decorated for the upcoming wedding. On the wedding day, the ladies of Himalaya’s palace bathe Parvati, dress her in traditional wedding attire, and adorn her with auspicious decorations. Meanwhile, Shiva is also prepared for the ceremony by the Holy Mothers on Kailasa. He then rides his famous bull, Nandi, to Oshadhiprastha, accompanied by the Mothers, his Ganas, and other gods, and is welcomed at the city gates by Himalaya and the bride's party. His beauty captivates the spectators, especially the city’s ladies. Inside the palace, the wedding rituals, including the final blessing from Sarasvati, are performed. After the ceremony, guests depart, and Shiva stays at his father-in-law's house.

== Dispute and criticisms ==
=== Authenticity of Canto IX-XVII ===
The Kumārasaṃbhavam appears to have reached us either incomplete or as a fragment of a larger work. While some manuscripts contain seventeen cantos, only the first eight can be confirmed as Kalidasa's authentic writing based on available evidence. It seems that a later, less skilled author (or possibly two) continued the story in nine additional cantos, which describe the birth of Kumāra and his triumph over Tāraka as the gods' army leader. Importantly, for these nine cantos, there exists no commentary by Mallinātha (1350-1450), Kalidasa’s most renowned commentator, and, notably, are never referenced in Alaṃkāraśāstra, the Sanskrit treatises on literary theory where verses from the first eight cantos are commonly cited. Modern scholars also highlight a decline in the quality of writing, with more filler material, as further evidence that Kalidasa likely did not author these later sections.

=== Censorship of Canto VIII ===
Moralistic critics in medieval and later periods of India have harshly criticized Kalidasa for portraying the lovemaking of gods, especially in a court poem meant to be recited publicly in a royal court, including many contemporary or recent scholars as well. In Indian culture - Kama (Desire) is celebrated, but it must be aligned with Dharma (Righteousness), and one cannot explicitly portray the intimacy of the Divine Parents of the universe, much like one would refrain from doing so about their own parents. Some editions of the Kumārasaṃbhavam have been published without the eighth canto (Umāsuratavarṇanaḥ), especially when intended for educational purposes. However, by modern standards, the sexual content of this canto is handled with discretion, and much of it focuses on Shiva’s passionate and sensual descriptions of nature. The evidence supporting its authenticity is compelling, and the quality of the writing matches that of the rest of the poem.

This canto has been referenced even by an old literary critic like Vāmana (fl. late 8th—mid-9th century), who seemingly regarded it as an authentic part of the poem. The Kashmiri scholar - Kșemendra also cites verse VIII.87, attributing it to Kalidasa, though he criticizes it as an example of thematic impropriety (prabandhārthānaucitya), since it portrays the romantic union of Shiva and Parvati in the same way as that of an ordinary couple:

Ānandavardhana, who seems to consider the depiction of Shiva and Parvati’s amorous union (devīsambhogavarņana) in the Kumārasaṃbhavam as genuine, argues that the portrayal of such divine love does not seem improper (anaucitya) due to the poet’s brilliance, even though it involves high divinities:

Aruņagirinātha addresses the objections regarding the indecency of depicting Shiva and Parvati’s lovemaking by condemning those who refused to comment on the eighth canto, calling their hesitation foolish:

Both Aruņagirinātha and Nārāyaņapaņdita mention earlier commentators by name who avoided commenting the eighth canto. Furthermore, based on the introductory notes in Mallinātha’s commentary, it seems that his remarks on this section of the poem were treated as a separate work, possibly intended only for older students.

== Adaptations ==
The late Sanskrit play Pārvatīpariṇaya (पार्वतीपरिणय, "The Wedding of Parvati") shares the same subject as that of Kumārasaṃbhavam. The play closely follows the poem, not just in its sequence of events but also in much of its wording, making the Pārvatīparinaya appear as an effort to adapt an epic poem into a play. However, the play modifies certain elements of Kalidasa's plot, often adding details that evoke familiar features of well-known Sanskrit dramas.

Kumara Sambhavam is a 1969 Indian film adaptation of the poem by P. Subramaniam.

== Bibliography ==
- Ralph T. H. Griffith (1853). The Birth of the War-God . London: Wm. H. Allen & Co. – via Wikisource.
- Hank Heifetz (1 January 1990). The Origin of the Young God: Kālidāsa's Kumārasaṃbhava. Motilal Banarsidass. ISBN 978-81-208-0754-9.
