= Shripad Krishna Belvalkar =

Indian scholar

Shripad Krishna Belvalkar (1881 in Narsobawadi – 8 January 1967 in Poona) was an Indian scholar of Sanskrit, educator, historian, and writer, best known for his translations and editions of the Uttararamacarita, the Kavyadarsha, and the Bhagavad Gita, and his research on Sanskrit grammar, Indian philosophy and Indology. He served as honorary secretary of the Bhandarkar Oriental Research Institute, frequently collaborated with Ramachandra Dattatrya Ranade, and his works have since become a part of the Harvard Oriental Series.
