= Bhamaha =

7th century Sanskrit poetician

Bhamaha (Sanskrit: भामह, Bhāmaha) (c. 7th century) was a Sanskrit poetician believed to be contemporaneous with Daṇḍin. He is noted for writing a work called the Kavyalankara (Sanskrit: काव्यालङ्कार, Kāvyālaṅkāra) ("The ornaments of poetry"). For centuries, he was known only by reputation, until manuscripts of the Kāvyālaṃkāra came to the attention of scholars in the early 1900s.

== Biography ==
Bhamaha was apparently from Kashmir.

Little is known of Bhāmaha's life: the last verse of the Kāvyālaṃkāra says his father was called Rakrilagomin, but little more is known:

Later Kashmiri writers often treat Bhāmaha as the founding father of Sanskrit poetics and, by the same token, make him stand for everything that is old school, a trend that must have begun with Udbhaṭa (c. 800) and his vast commentary on Bhāmaha’s work. This Kashmiri connection has led many to assume that Bhāmaha, too, hailed from the northern vale. But if this is the case, then, unlike many of his followers, whose patrons, positions, and, in some cases, salaries are referred to by Kalhaṇa, Bhāmaha does not receive any mention in the famous chronicle of Kashmir’s courts, the Rājataraṅgiṇī (River of Kings).

Bhāmaha is rather seldom mentioned as a poet by later commentators, but seems to have had a significant reputation as a grammarian, being cited by the eighth-century Śāntarakṣita. The Bhāmaha who composed the Kāvyālaṃkāra might also be the same person as the one who composed a commentary on Vararuchi's Prākṛtaprakāáa, a Prakrit grammar, and a few other works have also been tentatively attributed to him.

The Kāvyālaṃkāra has, however, been widely recognised as similar to and in many ways in disagreement with the Kāvyādarśa by Daṇḍin. Although modern scholars have debated which scholar was borrowing from which, or who was responding to whom, recent work suggests that Bhāmaha was the earlier scholar, and that Daṇḍin was responding to him. This would place Bhāmaha no later than the early 600s.

== Kāvyālaṃkāra ==
Bhamaha's Kāvyālaṃkāra is divided into six paricchedas (chapters). It comprises 398 verses, including two verses at the end of the sixth chapter, which briefly describe the number of verses on each of the five topics. In the first verse, Bhamaha calls his work the Kavyalankara.

The first chapter comprises 69 verses. After the invocation of Sarva, it defines kavya and describes the qualifications of a good poet. It also narrates various genres and styles of poems, which include Vaidarbhi (from Vidarbha) and Gaudi (from Gauda).

In the beginning of the second chapter, three gunas of poems, namely prasada, madhurya and ojah are discussed.

It is followed by the discussion about the alankaras (figures of speech), which continues till the end of the third chapter.

The fourth chapter discusses the eleven types of doshas (blemishes) of kavya and defines the first ten of these doshas with illustrations.

The fifth chapter discusses the eleventh dosha and its causes. It is based on the Nyaya-Vaisheshika epistemology. The sixth chapter emphasizes the necessity of grammatical accuracy and some practical hints to poets are also provided.

=== Editions ===
- Kāvyālaṅkāra of Bhāmaha. Ed. Batuk Nāth Śarmā and Baldev Upādhyāya. Kāśī Sanskrit Series 61, 1928. Reprinted, Varanasi: Chaukhambha Sanskrit Sansthan, 1981.
- Kāvyālaṅkāra of Bhāmaha: Edited with English Translation and Notes. P.V. Naganatha Sastry. 2nd ed. Delhi: Motilal Banarsidass, 1970.

=== Commentaries ===
The only known pre-modern commentary on Kavyalankara is the 'learned and important' Bhamahavivarana or Bhamahavritti by Udbhaṭa. However, only a few fragments of this survive.
