= Mammata Bhatta =

Sanskrit rhetorician (c. 1100 AD)

Mammata or Mammata Bhatta (c. 1100 AD) was a was a Kashmiri Sanskrit literary theorist and rhetorician best known as the creator of the prominent treatise Kavyaprakash. In addition to this major work, he authored the texts Shabda Vyaparaparichaya and Sangita Ratnavali.

== Life and background ==
Comprehensive historical details regarding the life of Mammata are limited. Biographical accounts were documented in the 17th century by Bhimasena Dikshit at the beginning of Sudhasagara, a commentary on Kavyaprakash. According to this account, Goddess Saraswati manifested in human form as a male in Kashmir, taking birth at the residence of Jayyata under the name Mammata, in order to impart the realization of the eternal science of Shabdabrahma.

Mammata was an adherent of Shaivagama. He traveled to Kashi to pursue his studies, where he later composed Kavyaprakash and subsequently penned its vritti (explanatory commentary). He had two younger brothers, Kaiyata and Uvvata, both of whom he personally educated. Kaiyata authored Pradip, a commentary on Patanjali's Mahabhashya, while Uvvata composed a commentary on the Vajasaneyi Samhita of the Shukla Yajurveda.

Scholars maintain differing viewpoints regarding the historical accuracy of Bhimasena Dikshit's account due to a chronological gap of approximately six centuries between Mammata and Dikshit. Internal evidence within Mammata's verses includes a mention of the generosity of King Bhoja, suggesting that Mammata lived during Bhoja's reign. Additionally, the poet Shri Harsha, who wrote Naishadhiyacharita, is traditionally considered to be Mammata's nephew.

== Works ==
=== Kavyaprakash ===
Kavyaprakash holds a highly valued position within the field of Sanskrit poetics and has been widely studied throughout India for the past eight to nine centuries. The text serves as a compilation and synthesis of several centuries of preceding poetic thought.

==== Structure and content ====
The treatise comprises 143 karikas (verses or rules) distributed across ten chapters known as Ullasas. The text is structurally divided into three components: the initial karika (sutra), followed by the vritti (exposition), and dekhi (illustrative examples).

Mammata provides a comprehensive analysis of all major elements of poetry with the exception of drama. The work covers:

- The definition and objectives of poetry.
- The classification of poetry into excellent, intermediate, and inferior categories.
- The categories of word meanings, including vachyartha (literal), lakshyartha (indicated), vyangyartha (suggested), and tatparyartha (intended meaning).
- The two primary classifications of dhvani (suggestion).

The constituents of rasa (aesthetic flavor), detailing sthayibhava (dominant emotions), vibhava (determinants), and vyabhicharibhava (transitory emotions).

- Rhetorical figures of speech, describing 6 types of shabdalamkaras (verbal ornaments) and 61 types of arthalamkaras (ideational ornaments).

To illustrate these concepts, Mammata incorporated approximately 620 verses drawn from the works of other literary figures. He also integrated specific karikas from Bharata's Natyashastra as well as selections from various other authors. While the entire treatise is traditionally attributed to Mammata, scholarly tradition suggests that its concluding portion was completed by a separate writer.

==== Commentaries ====
Numerous commentaries have been written on Kavyaprakash. Notable historical commentaries include Pradip by Govinda Thakkura, Prabha by Vidyanath Tatsat, Udyot by Nagoji Bhatta, Sanketa by Manikachandra, Dipika (also known as Jayanti) by Jayantabhatta, Kavyadarsha by Someshwara and Nidarshana by Rajanaka Ananda.

=== Other treatises ===
Beyond his primary work on poetics, Mammata wrote two other texts, Shabda Vyaparaparichaya and Sangita Ratnavali.
