= Daṇḍin =

Indian writer

Daṇḍi or Daṇḍin (Sanskrit: दण्डिन्) (fl. 7th–8th century) was an Indian Sanskrit grammarian and author of prose romances. He is one of the best-known writers in Indian history.

== Life ==
Daṇḍin's account of his life in Avantisundari-katha-sara states that he was a great-grandson of Dāmodara, a court poet from Achalapura who served, among others, the Pallava king Siṃhaviṣṇu and the Ganga king Durvinīta. Avanti-sundari-katha-sara is the verse version of Avanti-sundari-katha, a prose text attributed to Daṇḍin: it is mostly faithful to the original text, but the original text states that Damodara was a distinct poet, whom Bharavi introduced to prince Vishnuvardhana.

Yigal Bronner, a scholar of Sanskrit poetry, concludes that 'These details all suggest that Daṇḍin’s active career took place around 680–720 CE under the auspices of Narasiṃhavarman II. Daṇḍin was widely praised as a poet by Sanskrit commentators such as Rajashekhara (fl. 920 CE), and his works are widely studied. One shloka (hymn) that explains the strengths of different poets says: दण्डिन: पदलालित्यम् (daṇḍinaḥ padalālityaṃ: "Daṇḍin is the master of playful words").

In his Avantisundarikatha, Dandin, a poet associated with the Pallava court at Kanchipuram, refers to the Pallavas and their territory of Thondainadu as Dramila (Tamil). The term occurs more than once in the work.

David Shulman notes that the Dandin describes a story as being located in dravidesu, which he interprets as referring to the Tamil country. Shulman also notes the use of the term drāviḍa-dharmika (“Dravida ascetic”) as a recurring motif in Sanskrit narratives.

== Works ==
Daṇḍin's writings are in Sanskrit. His works are not well preserved. He composed the now incomplete Daśakumāracarita, and the even less complete Avantisundarī (The Story of the Beautiful Lady from Avanti), in prose. He is best known for composing the Kāvyādarśa ('Mirror of Poetry'), the handbook of classical Sanskrit poetics, or Kāvya, which appears to be intact. Debate continues over whether these were composed by a single person, but 'there is now a wide consensus that a single Daṇḍin authored all these works at the Pallava court in Kāñcī around the end of the seventh century'.

=== Kāvyādarśa ===
The Kāvyādarśa is the earliest surviving systematic treatment of poetics in Sanskrit. Kāvyādarśa was strongly influenced by Bhaṭṭi's Bhaṭṭikāvya. In Kāvyādarśa, Daṇḍin argues that a poem's beauty derives from its use of rhetorical devices – of which he distinguished thirty-six.

He is known for his complex sentences and creation of long compound words (some of his sentences ran for half a page, and some of his words for half a line).

The Kāvyādarśa is similar to and in many ways in disagreement with Bhāmaha's Kāvyālankāra. Although modern scholars have debated who was borrowing from whom, or responding to whom, Bhāmaha appears to have been earlier, and that Daṇḍin was responding to him. By the tenth century, the two works were apparently studied together, and seen as foundational works on Sanskrit poetry.

=== Daśakumāracarita and Avantisundarī ===
Daśakumāracarita is a prose text that tells of the vicissitudes of ten princes in their pursuit of love and power. It contains stories of common life and reflects Indian society during the period, couched in colourful Sanskrit prose. It consists of (1) Pūrvapīṭhikā, (2) Daśakumāracarita Proper, and (3) Uttarapīṭhikā.

Overlapping in content with the Daśakumāracarita and also attributed to Daṇḍin is the even more fragmentary Avantisundarī or Avantisundarīkathā (The Story of the Beautiful Lady from Avanti). Its two fragmentary manuscripts tell a story that is reflected by a later, fragmentary Sanskrit poem, the Avantisundarīkathāsāra (Gist of the Story of the Beautiful Lady from Avanti) and a fragmentary thirteenth-century Telugu translation.

The two texts may represent separate compositions on the same theme by the same author, or are parts of one prose work by Daṇḍin that was broken up early in its transmission.
