= Kavyadarsha =

The Kavyadarsha (Sanskrit: काव्यादर्श, Kāvyādarśa) by Dandin is the earliest surviving systematic treatment of poetics in Sanskrit.

== Contents ==
This work is divided into 3 paricchedas (chapters) in most of the printed editions, except one, where the third chapter of the other editions is further divided into two. Most of the printed editions have 660 verses, except one, which has 663. In Kāvyādarśa, Daṇḍin argued that a poem's beauty derived from its use of rhetorical devices – of which he distinguished thirty-six types. He was the main proponent of gunaprasthana, the view that poetry needed qualities or virtues such as shleshha (punning), prasaada (favour), samataa (sameness), maadhurya (beauty), arthavyakti (interpretation), and ojah (vigour). Poetry consisted in the presence of one of these qualities or a combination of them.

== Influence ==
The Kavyadarsha was in ancient times translated into Kannada, Sinhala, Pali, Tamil and Tibetan, and perhaps even influenced Chinese regulated verse. It was widely quoted by premodern scholars of Sanskrit, including Appayya Dīkṣita (1520–1592); it was included almost in its entirety in the poetic treatises by King Bhoja of Dhār (r. 1011–1055).

== Editions and translations ==
Daṇḍin's Kavyadarsha was first printed in 1863, and has often been re-edited since.

- Daṇḍin's Poetik (Kâvyâdarça): Sanskrit und Deutsch. Ed. and trans. O. Böhtlingk. Leipzig: Haessel, 1890 (with German translation).
- Kāvyādarśa of Daṇḍin, with the commentary of Taruṇavācaspati and the anonymous Hṛdayaṅgama. Ed. M. Rangacharya. Madras: Brahmavadin Press, 1910.
- Śrīmad-ācārya-Daṇḍi-viracitaḥ Kāvyādarśaḥ/Kāvyādarśa of Daṇḍin: Sanskrit text and English translation. Ed. and trans. S. K. Belvalkar. Poona: Oriental Book-Supplying Agency, 1924 (with English translation).
- Kāvyādarśa of Daṇḍin, with the commentaries of Vādijaṅghāladeva and Taruṇavācaspati and an anonymous gloss. Ed. D. T. Tatacharya. Tirupati: Shrinivas Press, 1936.
- Kāvyādarśa [Kāvyalakṣaṇa] of Daṇḍin, with the commentary of Ratnaśrījñāna. Ed. Anantalal Thakur and Upendra Jha. Darbhanga: Mithila Institute of Post Graduate Studies, 1957.
- Kāvyādarśa of Daṇḍin, with commentaries by Ratnaśrījñāna, Jīvānanda Vidyāsāgara Bhaṭṭācārya, Raṅgācārya Reḍḍi, and Taruṇavācaspati. 4 vols. Delhi: NAG Publishers, 1999.
- Dharmendra Gupta (1973), kāvyādarśaḥ. ācāryadaṇḍiviracitaḥ. suvarṇaṇākhyayā saṃskṛtahindivyākhyāyā sametaḥ, Delhi: Meharcand Lacchmandas Review
- Mārgavibhāga – Die Unterscheidung der Stilarten. Kritische Ausgabe des ersten Kapitels von Daṇḍins Poetik Kāvyādarśa und der tibetischen Übertragung Sñan ṅag me loṅ nebst einer deutschen Übersetzung des Sanskrittextes. Herausgegeben nach nepalesischen Handschriften des Sanskrittextes und der kanonischen und außerkanonischen tibetischen Überlieferung unter besonderer Berücksichtigung der älteren Kommentarliteratur, samt Glossaren, ausführlichen Bibliographien, Konkordanzen und Indizes. Von Dragomir Dimitrov. Marburg 2002. (Indica et Tibetica, 40)
- Śabdālaṃkāradoṣavibhāga – Die Unterscheidung der Lautfiguren und der Fehler. Kritische Ausgabe des dritten Kapitels von Daṇḍins Poetik Kāvyādarśa und der tibetischen Übertragung Sñan ṅag me loṅ samt dem Sanskrit-Kommentar des Ratnaśrījñāna, dem tibetischen Kommentar des Dpaṅ Blo gros brtan pa und einer deutschen Übersetzung des Sanskrit-Grundtextes. Von Dragomir Dimitrov. Wiesbaden 2011. (Veröffentlichungen der Helmuth von Glasenapp-Stiftung, Monographien 2)
