= Branches of the Rashtrakuta dynasty =

Several branches of the Rashtrakuta dynasty were created by the kings, commanders and relatives of the Rashtrakuta family during their expansion into central and northern India in the eighth to the tenth centuries. These kingdoms ruled during the reign of the parent empire or continued to rule for centuries after its fall or came to power much later. Well known among these were the Rashtrakutas of Lata (757–888), the Rattas of Saundatti (875–1230) in modern-day Karnataka, the Rashtrakutas of Rajasthan (known as Rajputana) and ruling from Hastikundi or Hathundi (893–996), Dahal (near Jabalpur), Rashtraudha dynasty of Mayuragiri (Baglana) in modern-day Maharashtra and Rashtrakutas of Kanauj.

== Rashtrakuta branches ==
These branches emerged as a result of Rashtrakuta conquest of North India.

Rashtrakutas of Lata (Gujarat):

- Indra (807–818) (brother of Govinda III above)
- Karka and Govinda (818–826)
- Dhruva II (835–845)
- Akalavarsha Shubhatunga (867)
- Dhruva III (-871)
- Direct rule from Manyakheta by Krishna II

Rashtrakutas of Hastikundi (Hathundi) (Jodhpur)

- Harivarma
- Vidagdha (916–938)
- Mammata (939)
- Balaprasada (997)
- The Hathundi Rashtrakutas

Rashtrakutas of Dahal (near Jabalpur) (Madhya Pradesh)

- Golhanadeva (1023)

Rashtrakutas of Kannauj (11th century-13th century)

- Gopal (4th king)
- Tribhuvana
- Madanapala (1119)
- Devapala (Lost Shravasti to Gahadavalas in 1128)
- Bhimapala
- Surapala
- Amritapala
- Lakhanpala (In 1202 defeated by Qutub-ud-din)
- Mahasamanta Barahadeva (under Gahadavala Adakkhamalla)
