= Somadeva Suri =

Aacharya Shri Somadeva Suri Somadeva Suri

Personal life
- Born: 920 CE
- Notable work(s): Yashastilaka, Upasakadyayana

Religious life
- Religion: Jainism
- Sect: Digambar

Somadeva Suri was a south Indian Jain monk of the 10th century CE (fl. 959–66, possibly born in Bengal region about 920), author of a work known as "Upasakadyayana" "chapter on lay followers (upasakas)", a central work of Digambara shravakacara literature, i.e. instructions and prescriptions for shravakas or Jain lay followers.

He also authored Yashastilaka, a 10th-century Sanskrit champu on the life of a king Yasodhara.

== Lineage ==
Somadeva was a disciple of Acharya Nemideva of Devasangha section of Mula Sangh (associated with Akalankadeva). Somadeva composed Yashstilaka in the domain of Vagaraj, a feudatory of Rashtrakuta Krishna III. He is mentioned in copperplate and an inscription of the Chalukya clan.

Vadiraja, author of Yashodhara-charita, and Pushpasena, (the teacher of Vadibhasimha, author of Gadyachintamani, were both disciples of Somadeva Suri.

== Residence ==
Somadeva Suri was a member of the Gauda Sangha. Before 957, he was at the court of the Pratihara king Mahendrapala II, at Kanyakubja (modern Kannauj). There, he wrote Niti-vakya-amrita, and possibly Trivarga-Mahedra-Matali-jalpa.

Later, he migrated the Vemulavada Chalukya kingdom. There, he composed Yashodhara-charita (or Yashas-tilaka-champu, c. 959) during the reign of Baddega II, at Gangadhara town.

== Works ==
"Upasakadyayana" is a section of the champu text Yashastilaka. Girish Karnad's play Bali is based on Yashastilaka.

Somadeva Suri also wrote the Nitivakyamrtam "Nectar of the Science of Polity" (ed. Sundaralala Sastri 1976, Menta 1987), a treatise on statecraft. The text of the Nitivakyamrtam mentions that Somadeva was also the author of a literary work called Yashastilaka (see Kavyamala, 70).

He is sometimes regarded as a "revolutionary thinker of early medieval India", in his works he discusses the vices (pratyuhasamuha) which brought to the country the conquest of the Muslims (Tajikas). It is notable that he describes the use of hydraulics for irrigating a garden.
