= Yashastilaka =

10th-century Sanskrit text

Yashas-tilaka
- Author: Somadeva Suri
- Language: Sanskrit
- Subject: Story of king Yashodhara
- Genre: Champu
- Set in: Ancient India
- Publication place: Vemulavada Chalukya kingdom (present-day India)
- composed 959 CE

Yashas-tilaka (IAST: Yaśas-tilaka) is a 10th-century champu (prose and verse) Sanskrit text that promotes the Jaina doctrine using the story of king Yashodhara. It was written by the Jaina writer Somadeva, in the Vemulavada Chalukya kingdom of India. The text provides information about the literary and socio-political aspects of the contemporary period, as well as Jaina and non-Jaina philosophical and religious doctrines.

Alternative titles for the text include Yashas-tilaka-champu (Yaśastilakacampū) and Yasho-dhara-maharaja-charita (Yaśodharamahārājacarita, "the story of king Yashodhara").

== Authorship and date ==
Somadeva, the author of Yashas-tilaka, lived in the Vemulavada Chalukya kingdom, within the Rashtrakuta empire. The colophon of the text mentions that he wrote it in 959 CE, in a town called Gangadhara near the Chalukya capital Lembula-pataka (Vemulavada).

The text states that its manuscript was created by a well-known calligrapher named Rachchhuka (IAST: Racchuka), who was known as Lekhaka-shikha-mani ("top jewel among scribes"). The text also states that women employed Rachchhuka to write love letters. The original manuscript inscribed by Rachchhuka is now lost.

=== Sources and similar texts ===
The story of Yasho-dhara is much older than Somadeva, and appears in the Prakrit-language text Samarā-ichchakahā, written by the earlier Jaina writer Haribhadra, whose date is not certain. The core story of Haribhadra's version is similar to that of Somadeva, and the names Abhaya-ruchi and Abhaya-mati appear in both the texts. The texts diverge in minor ways, for example, Haribhadra does not describe the episode of Mara-datta, and the names of other principal characters are different. Unlike Somadeva, Haribhadra does not criticize other faiths.

Jaina writer Uddyotana-suri, in his Kuvalaya-mala (779 CE), mentions another text called Yasho-dhara-charita ("the story of Yasho-dhara"), written by Prabhanjana. Vasava-sena, a later writer refers to two earlier texts narrating Yasho-dhara's story, written by Prabhanjana and Harishena. The identity of Harishena is uncertain, but he may be same as the author of the Sanskrit-language Katha-kosha (931 CE).

Several later works also contain the story of Yasho-dhara. These include Pushpa-danta's Apabhramsha Jasahara-chariu (10th century), Vadi-raja's Sanskrit-language Yasho-dhara-charita (1025 CE), Vasava-sena's Sanskrit-language Yasho-dhara-charita (before 1308 CE), a poem by Vatsa-raja (before 1308 CE), Gandharva's revision of Jasahara-chariu (1308 CE), and a prose Sanskrit-language version by Kshama-kalyana (18th century). Poems dealing with the subject also appear in Old Gujarati, Old Hindi, Tamil, and Kannada languages.

The motif of a high-ranking woman with a low-born paramour, who murders her husband, is a prominent theme in Yashas-tilaka. This motif occurs in several other Indian texts. Besides, the Yashas-tilaka includes verses from other texts; for example, to illustrate the Buddhist doctrine, Somadeva cites some verses from Dharmakirti's Pramana-varttika (c. 600 CE).

== Critical edition ==
During 1901–1903, Nirnaya Sagar press published the Sanskrit text of Yashas-tilaka with the commentary of Shruta-sagara, in two volumes. However, it contains many defects.

In 1944, V. Raghavan of Madras University published a paper titled Gleanings from Somadeva-suri's Yaśastilaka Campū, published in the Ganganatha Jha Research Institute Journal. Raghavan's paper mentions an unpublished commentary of Shri-deva on Yashas-tilaka: this commentary exists in form of a 34-leaf manuscript at the Bhandarkar Oriental Research Institute (BORI).

In 1949, K.K. Handiqui wrote a study on the text, using four manuscripts, including an incomplete one. He mainly relied on a manuscript from BORI: this copy contains several marginal notes which are helpful in studying the text. In 1968, he wrote a second edition with supplementary notes about the relationship between the Chalukyas of Vemulavada and Somadeva, the locality where Somadeva composed his works, and Chalukya temples.

== Synopsis ==
The Yashas-tilaka is a religious romance, and deals with tragic incidents of domestic life. It provides information about the literary and socio-political aspects of the contemporary period, as well as Jaina and non-Jaina philosophical and religious doctrines. The text is divided into eight parts (ashvasas).

=== Book 1 ===
Mara-datta, the ruler of the Rajapura city in the Yaudheya country, is a reckless man addicted to wine and women. A tantric teacher advises him to perform a ritual sacrifice to obtain a magical sword. The sacrifice would involve killing of several animals and humans at the Maha-bhairava temple dedicated to the goddess Chandamari. Accordingly, Mara-datta invites people to the temple on the pretext of celebrating the Mahanavami festival.

Meanwhile, the Jaina monk Sudatta, along with his disciples, is on his way to Rajapura. With his supernatural abilities, he learns of the impending slaughter at the temple, and encamps at a hill near the city. He sends several disciples to seek alms from the neighbouring areas. To Rajapura, he sends two young disciples: a boy named Abhaya-ruchi and his sister, a girl named Abhaya-mati. Kusuma-vati, the mother of these disciples, is a sister of Mara-datta. She was also the chief queen of Yasho-mati, who was a son of the king Yasho-dhara.

Abhaya-ruchi and Abhaya-mati arrive at the temple, just before Mara-datta is about to begin the sacrifice. Mara-datta does not recognize them, but the mere sight of the two children makes his cruel thoughts go away. Encouraged by a bard, he lays down his sword, and asks them who they are. Abhaya-ruchi intend to convert the king to Jainism, but proceed gradually, beginning with conventional pangyerics to praise the king.

=== Book 2 ===
Abhaya-ruchi narrates their previous births, stating that Abhaya-mati was once Chandra-mati, a consort of king Yashorgha of Ujjayini. Abhaya-ruchi was Yasho-dhara, the son of Chandra-mati and Yashorgha, in his previous birth. One day, king Yashorgha saw a grey hair on his head, and decided to retire as a Jaina monk. He issued orders for prince Yasho-dhara's marriage and coronation as the new king. In a grand ceremony in a newly built city, his son Yasho-dhara was crowned and married to Amrta-mati.

=== Book 3 ===
Abhaya-ruchi continues his narration of Yasho-dhara's life, describing court affairs and other political matters. Yasho-dhara's interaction with a spy named Shankha-naka is described in detail: the spy describes the misdeeds of a minister named Pamarodara, and blames the king for raising such a low-born person to a high rank. Pamarodara is described as a supporter of the Charvaka philosophy, who disregards the caste rules and employs outcaste Chandalas. The spy encourages the king to remove the minister, but the text does not mention whether the king took any action against the minister.

A description of the king's activities continues: military reviews, meeting with envoys, actions of the court jester, discussion on Arthashastra, dance performances, philosophical discussions, training and inspection of elephants, and a lecture on health and dietetics.

King Yasho-dhara then narrates how he engages in amorous sports in a garden named Madana-mada-vinoda ("the frenzied gaiety of love"), and how he plays water-sports with his mistresses at a place called Yantra-dhara-grha ("hall of the mechanical showers"). He describes the hall for water sports, which contains various mechanical water-ejecting devices, in form of clouds, animals and people. For example, a woman-shaped mechanical device discharges streams of liquid sandal when the various parts of the woman's body are pressed.

Next, the text describes some other events from Yasho-dhara's life, including his victory in a war against king Achala of Panchala; seasonal celebrations (such as the festival of the god of love, Mahanavami, and the festival of light); and his archery skills.

=== Book 4 ===
Yasho-dhara describes an episode from his married life, which is the main theme of the story:

One night, the queen got out of their bed, dressed to appear like a maid, and left the bedroom. Unknown to her, the king was awake, and started following her. The queen entered the hut of an ugly and crippled elephant driver named Ashta-vanka. The elephant driver beat her up for coming late, but she profusely apologized and confessed her love for him, stating that even while sleeping with the king, she only thought of him. Yasho-dhara wanted to kill both of them, but restrained himself, thinking of the scandal that would follow and the grief it would cause to his son, prince Yasho-mati.

Yasho-dhara then returned to the palace, and pretended to sleep. After some time, the queen returned, and lay down on the bed as if nothing had happened. The king was initially puzzled why Amrta-mati fell for an ugly cripple, but then remembered that the elephant driver was an expert singer whose melodious songs captivated women. He felt disgust for women and worldly pleasures, and decided to renounce the world after appointing his son to the throne.

The next day, at the court, a bard recited some verses about worldly delusions and the futility of trying to control women. It appeared to the king that the bard knew about the events of the last night. Yasho-dhara's mother Chandra-mati noticed a change in the king's demeanour, and guessed that it had something to do with his married life. A maidservant had earlier told the queen-mother that the queen was affectionate towards an elephant driver. The queen-mother asked Yasho-dhara why he was upset, but the king made up a story about having seen a dream in which he renounced the world. She asked him not to believe in such fantastic dreams, and narrated stories about others' dreams to prove her point.

The queen-mother advised the king to perform a ritual sacrifice of animals to ward off evil omens. The king was influenced by the non-violent Jaina faith, and expressed revulsion at the idea. The queen-mother criticized the courtiers for allowing the Jaina Digambaras to influence her son, and exhorted the king to worship the traditional gods - Shiva, Vishnu, or Surya. The two then engaged in a controversial debate comparing Brahmana and Jaina faiths. The king cited various texts to prove the antiquity and the prestige of the Jaina faith.

Finally, the queen mother proposed a compromise: the king would only sacrifice a cock made out of flour. When the queen Amrta-mati learned about the events at the court, she realized that the king must have caught her cheating on him the previous night. She then made a plan to kill the king, before he could kill her. She sent the minister Gavishthira to the king, stating that she was willing to sacrifice herself to ensure the king's safety if he chose to conduct the sacrifice, or to accompany the king to the forest if he chose to renounce the world. She also invited the king and the queen mother to a banquet.

The king was disgusted at the queen's hypocrisy, but accepted the invitation. After ritually sacrificing the cock made of flour, he and the queen mother dined at the queen's banquet, where she poisoned them to death.

=== Book 5 ===
Abhaya-ruchi then narrates the king's subsequent births:

Yasho-dhara was born as a peacock, and a hunter presented him to the new king Yasho-mati, his son in the previous birth. Meanwhile, the queen-mother Chandra-mati was reborn as a dog, and was also presented to the king as a fine hunting dog. After arriving at the capital Ujjayini, the peacock remembered his previous birth. One day, it saw Amrta-mati dallying with the elephant driver, and attacked them. The maid-servants threw various things at the bird to make it go away, and the dog chased and killed it. Meanwhile, when the king saw the dog attacking the peacock, he hit the dog with a board, killing it.

In their next births, Yasho-dhara was reborn as a deer and Chandra-mati was reborn as a snake. The deer developed a taste for snake's flesh, and killed the snake. Moments later, a hyena killed the deer.

Next, Yasho-dhara was reborn as a big fish, and Chandra-mati was born as a crocodile in the Shipra River. One day, the crocodile attacked a maid of the royal household, while she was playing water sports in the river. Angered, the king Yasho-mati ordered all dangerous animals in the river to be destroyed. The crocodile and the fish were caught in a net, and each day, a part of their flesh was cut, cooked, and served to Brahmanas. They thus died a slow, painful death.

Then, Yasho-dhara and Chandra-mati were reborn as goats in the village of Kankahi near Ujjain. One day, the male goat (Yasho-dhara) died when a ram attacked it, and was reborn as a foetus in the womb of the female goat (Chandra-mati). Sometime later, king Yasho-mati visited the area on a hunting expedition, but could not kill any wild animals in the forest. Frustrated, he returned to the village and shot dead the female goat with an arrow. The king ripped open her belly, and found the young male goat alive. He took the animal to Ujjayini, and gave it to his cook. At the royal kitchen, the goat saw Amrta-mati teaching the cooks how to roast meat. Because of her sins, she had been affected with leprosy, and her body emitted a bad smell. The maids mocked her, and told the passers-by that she had poisoned her husband, who was a good and great man. Ultimately, the goat was killed for Amrta-mati's food. Meanwhile, the female goat was reborn as a buffalo in Kalinga. Sometime later, it came to Ujjayini, and was tortured to death for attacking King Yasho-mati's horse.

Yasho-dhara and Chandra-mati were then born as a cock and a hen in a Chandala settlement near the city of Ujjayini. Meanwhile, in Kalinga, King Sudatta faced the choice between cruelly punishing a murderer (thus committing the sin of non-violence) and showing leniency to the murderer (thus encouraging social disorder). Failing to reconcile justice with mercy, he renounced the throne and become a Jaina monk. Elsewhere, a vidyadhara disturbed the meditation of a sage, and was cursed to become a hangman in Ujjayini. One day, the hangman acquired the cock and the hen from a Chandala boy, caged them, and brought them to a temple garden. There, the monk Sudatta proved the superiority of the Jaina doctrine of Ahimsa (non-violence) before the leaders of other faiths (a Buddhist, a Shaiva, a Bhagvata, and a Brahmana). He recounted the previous births of the cock and the hen, explaining that they had suffered for engaging in violence. Impressed by him, the hangman and other leaders converted to Jainism. The hangman's curse was removed: he regained his vidyadhara form, and left. Meanwhile, Yasho-mati killed the birds with an arrow while demonstrating his ability to hit the target simply by hearing sounds.

Yasho-mati and Chandra-mati were then reborn as the children of king Yasho-mati and his queen Kusumavali. While she was still pregnant, Kusumavali had asked the king to ban meat, alcohol, and harming of animals. The king realized that his children would lean towards Jainism, and tried his best to fulfill the queen's wishes. The children, named Yashas-tilaka and Madana-mati, were better known as Abhaya-ruchi and Abhaya-mati because their mother had ensured abhaya (fearlessness) for all creatures.

One day, King Yasho-mati saw the naked Jaina monk Sudatta and felt disgust, because a companion called it an inauspicious sight. However, when a merchant told him that the monk was a former king, Yasho-mati talked to him and was impressed by him. Now feeling sorry that he had harboured ill-well against the monk, Yasho-mati thought of cutting and presenting his head to the sage as an expiatory offering. However, Sudatta read his mind and asked him not to do such a thing. The monk's power of mind-reading astonished the king, and the king asked him about his parents and grandparents. The monk explained that the king's grandfather Yashorgha had become a divine sage because he followed the Jaina doctrine. His grandmother Chandra-mati and his father Yashorgha had to suffer through several rebirths because they had committed the sin of sacrificing a cock made out of flour, and were now reborn as his children. His mother Amrta-mati went to the fifth hell because of her sins.

King Yasho-mati recalled all the sins he had committed, and decided to renounce the world as penance. He told his children what the sage had told him, and the children now recalled their previous births. The children, who were 8 years old, became apprentice ascetics under Sudatta.

Abhaya-ruchi ends his narration, and advises Mara-datta to meet Sudatta. Mara-datta is moved by the stories, and decides to do so.

=== Book 6 ===
With his supernatural powers, Sudatta senses that Mara-datta is planning to visit him, and himself comes to the king's court. He is well received at the court, and explains the Jaina doctrines to the king, criticising other doctrines. He then explains the three gems of Jainism: right faith, right conduct, and right knowledge. He uses stories to explain four factors obstructing the growth of the right faith, and four factors promoting its growth.

=== Book 7 ===
Sudatta continues his discourse, using stories to explain the Jaina religious practices, such as prohibition of wine and meat. He then narrates another set of stories to explain the consequences of engaging in evil deeds such as theft, breach of trust, falsehood, lust, and greed.

=== Book 8 ===
Sudatta ends his discource with a description of the Jaina system of worship, explaining concepts such as japa and dhyana. Impressed by Sudatta, Mara-datta and others become Jains, and after their deaths, become celestial beings.

Somadeva ends the text with a glorification of Jainism, and with praise for the goddess of poetry (Kavita-devi).
