= Rashtraudha Kavya =

Historical poem (c. 1596)

Rashtraudha Kavya is a laudatory text written during the time of king Narayana of Mayuragiri (Baglana) in Maharashtra, a ruler of Bagul or Rashtraudha Mahrattā lineage It was composed by poet Rudrakavi in 1596.

"Rashtraudha" is an alternate spelling and a vernacular form of the term "Rashtrakuta". It refers to a Rāshtrakūta Dynasty.

== See also ==
- Rashtrakuta empire
