= Sex manual =

Genre of literature devoted to sexual practices

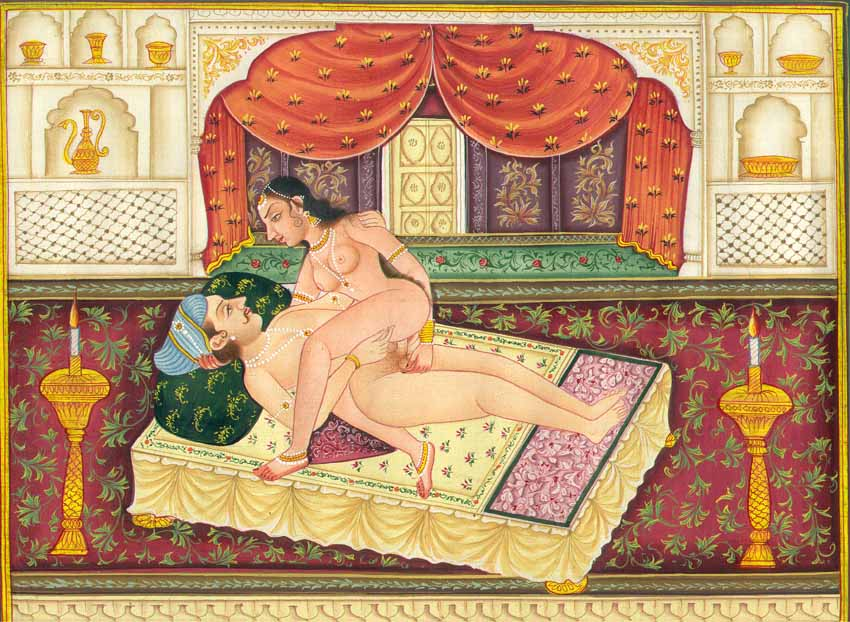
Artistic depiction of a sex position

Sex manuals are books which explain how to perform sexual practices; they also commonly feature advice on birth control, and sometimes on safe sex and sexual relationships.

== Early sex manuals ==
In the Graeco-Roman era, a sex manual was written by Philaenis of Samos, possibly a hetaira (courtesan) of the Hellenistic period (3rd–1st century BC). Preserved by a series of fragmentary papyruses which attest its popularity, it served as a source of inspiration for Ovid's Ars Amatoria, written around 3 BC, which is partially a sex manual, and partially a burlesque on the art of love.

The Kama Sutra of Vatsyayana, believed to have been written in the 1st to 6th centuries, has a notorious reputation as a sex manual, although only a small part of its text is devoted to sex. It was compiled by the Indian sage Vātsyāyana sometime between the second and fourth centuries CE. His work was based on earlier Kamashastras or Rules of Love going back to at least the seventh century BCE, and is a compendium of the social norms and love-customs of patriarchal Northern India around the time he lived. Vatsyayana's Kama Sutra is valuable today for his psychological insights into the interactions and scenarios of love, and for his structured approach to the many diverse situations he describes. He defines different types of men and women, matching what he terms "equal" unions, and gives detailed descriptions of many love-postures.

The Kama Sutra was written for the wealthy male city-dweller. It is not, and was never intended to be, a lover's guide for the masses, nor is it a "Tantric love-manual". About three hundred years after the Kama Sutra became popular, some of the love-making positions described in it were reinterpreted in a Tantric way. Since Tantra is an all-encompassing sensual science, love-making positions are relevant to spiritual practice.

The earliest East Asian sex manual is the Su Nü Jing. Probably written during the Chinese Han dynasty (206 BC – 220 AD), the work was long lost in China itself, but preserved in Japan as part of the medical anthology Ishinpō (984). It is a Daoist text purporting to describe how one might achieve long life and immortality by manipulating the yin and yang forces of the body through sexual techniques, which are described in some detail. The Yufang mijue (Chinese: 玉房秘訣), translated into English as Secrets from the Jade Chamber, Secret Formulae from the Jade Alcove, or Secret Instructions from the Jade Chamber, is a Chinese sex manual composed during the Han dynasty.

Medieval sex manuals include the lost works of Elephantis, by Constantine the African; Ananga Ranga, a 12th-century collection of Hindu erotic works;Ratirahasya, a medieval Indian sex manual written by Koka and The Perfumed Garden for the Soul's Recreation, a 16th-century Arabic work by Sheikh Nefzaoui. The fifteenth-century Speculum al foder (”The Mirror of Coitus”) is the first medieval European work to discuss sexual positions. Constantine the African also penned a medical treatise on sexuality, known as Liber de coitu. The medieval Jewish physician and writer Maimonides is author of a Treatise on Cohabitation.

== Modern sex manuals ==
Despite the existence of ancient sex manuals in other cultures, sex manuals were banned in Western culture for many years. What sexual information was available was generally only available in the form of illicit pornography or medical books, which generally discussed either sexual physiology or sexual disorders. The authors of medical works went so far as to write the most sexually explicit parts of their texts in Latin, so as to make them inaccessible to the general public (see Krafft-Ebing's Psychopathia Sexualis as an example).

A few translations of the ancient works were circulated privately, such as The Perfumed Garden.

In the late 19th Century, Ida Craddock wrote many serious instructional tracts on human sexuality and appropriate, respectful sexual relations between married couples. Among her works were The Wedding Night and Right Marital Living. In 1918 Marie Stopes published Married Love, considered groundbreaking despite its limitations in details used to discuss sex acts.

Theodoor Hendrik van de Velde's book Het volkomen huwelijk (The Perfect Marriage), published in 1926, was well known in Netherlands, Germany, Sweden and Estonia. In Germany, Die vollkommene Ehe reached its 42nd printing in 1932 despite its being placed on the list of forbidden books, the Index Librorum Prohibitorum, by the Roman Catholic Church. In Sweden, Det fulländade äktenskapet was widely known although regarded as pornographic and unsuitable for young readers long into the 1960s. In English, Ideal Marriage: Its Physiology and Technique has 42 printings in its original 1930 edition, and was republished in new editions in 1965 and 2000.

David Reuben, M. D.'s book Everything You Always Wanted to Know About Sex* (*But Were Afraid to Ask), published in 1969, was one of the first sex manuals that entered mainstream culture in the 1960s. Although it did not feature explicit images of sex acts, its descriptions of sex acts were detailed, addressing common questions and misunderstandings Reuben had heard from his own patients. Most notably, Reuben dismissed popular medical-psychiatric notions of "vaginal" vs. "clitoral" orgasm, explaining exactly how female physiology works.

The Joy of Sex by Dr. Alex Comfort was the first visually explicit sex manual to be published by a mainstream publisher. It was followed by The Joy of Gay Sex and The Joy of Lesbian Sex. Its appearance in public bookstores in the 1970s opened the way to the widespread publication of sex manuals in the West. As a result, hundreds of sex manuals are now available in print.

Sex manuals and works of the sort became so popular during the sexual revolution of the 1970s that even religious groups developed their own manuals. Most notably, the book The Act of Marriage by Christian Baptist authors Tim and Beverly LaHaye has sold over 2.5 million copies. While they began with the prerequisite of a heterosexual, complementarian relationship, the behavior they suggested went far beyond standard Christian teaching at that time. They suggested role play, experimentation with sex devices, masturbation to ensure climax and many other practices that were considered taboo up until the 1970s in Protestant bedrooms. Other manuals such as Marabel Morgan's The Total Woman emphasized the importance of the female orgasm. While they all required marriage, heterosexuality and complementarianism, they did push the bounds of accepted practice within their respective spheres of influence. Today, Christian authors continue to produce similar manuals and guides to their constituents in search of appropriate, fulfilling behavior. Books such as Mark and Grace Driscoll's Real Marriage encourage Christians to experiment in the bedrooms with their spouses, even encouraging acts that have long been rejected by Protestant tradition such as anal sex.

One of the currently most well known in America is The Guide to Getting it On! by Paul Joannides. Now in its tenth edition, it has won several prestigious awards and been translated into 12 foreign languages since appearing in 1996.

== List of sex manuals ==
- Bodansky, Stephen ‘Steve’; Bodansky, Vera (2002), The Illustrated Guide to Extended Massive Orgasm (1st ed.), Hunter House, ISBN 0-89793-362-1, 235pp.
- Hooper, Anne J (2002), Sexopedia (1st American ed.), DK, ISBN 0-7894-8958-9, 272 pp.
- Kemper, Alfred M (1972), Love Couches Design Criteria, Los Angeles, LCCN 75-36170, OCLC 3592145, 101 pp. — design criteria for assistive furniture, with sections on accommodation of disabled persons.
- McMeel, Andrews; Sußman, Lisa (2002), Sex Positions, Carlton, ISBN 1-84222-266-X, 96 pp.
- Nerve, ed. (2005), Position of the Day Playbook: Sex Every Day in Every Way, Chronicle Books, ISBN 0-8118-4701-2, 376 pp.
- Kalyanamalla, Ananga Ranga.
- Ovid, Ars Amatoria (satirical), Rome.
- Philaenis of Samos, Art of Love, Samos.
- Li, Dongxuan, Book of Dongxuan (Tang dynasty)
- Reuben, David, Everything You Always Wanted to Know About Sex* (*But Were Afraid to Ask).
- Chen, Zhiming, Good Recipes for Woman.
- winks, Catherine ‘Cathy’; Semans, Anne, The Good Vibrations Guide to Sex.
- Zhu, Peng, Guide for the Jade House.
- Joannides, Paul, The Guide to Getting it On.
- Huang-Ti, Handbooks of Sex.
- ————————, Tao of Love Coupling.
- Yasodhara, Jayamangala.
- Picano, Felice; White, Edmund, The Joy of Gay Sex.
- Comfort, Alex (1995), "The Joy of Sex", Nature, 374 (6518): 129, Bibcode:1995Natur.374..129H, doi:10.1038/374129a0.
- Vatsayana, Kama Sutra.
- Latif, Muhammad Abdul, Lazzat Un Nisa.
- Chen, Xilei, The Mystery of Chamber Art.
- Lian, Gao, On Abstinence in Sex.
- Tao, Hongjing, On the Loss and Gain of Intercourse with Woman.
- Sun, Simiao, On the Loss and Gain of The Chamber Art.
- Tuo, Hua, On Venereal disease
- Hong, Ge, Pao-Pu Zhi (Jin Dynasty (266–420))
- Kokkoka, Ratirahasya.
- Praudhadevaraja, Ratiratna Pradipika.
- Roberts, Dr. Amanda, Guide to Love and Sex, Reader’s Digest.
- Shou, Wang, Recipe of The Simple Lady.
- Chong, Hezi, The Secret Manual of The Jade House.
- Ji, Hong, The Wonder Book of The Chamber.
- Chen, Rong, The Yin Passage of Rongchen.
- Nawāḍir al-ayk fī maʻrifat al-nayk
