= Glaucus =

Semi-divine sea-dweller in Greek mythology

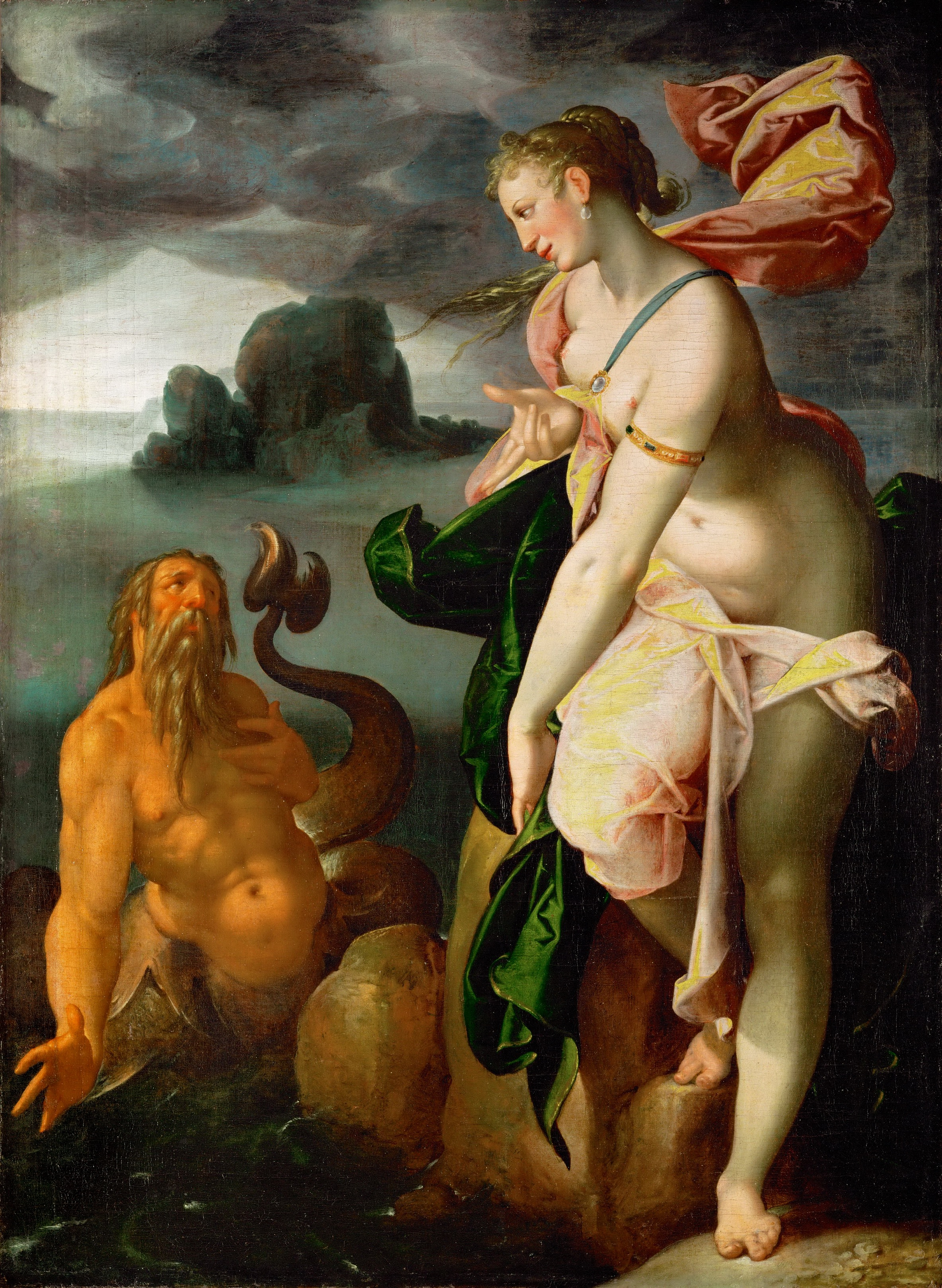
Glaucus and Scylla by Bartholomeus Spranger

In Greek mythology, Glaucus (/ˈɡlɔːkəs/; Ancient Greek: Γλαῦκος, romanized: Glaûkos, lit. 'shiny', 'bright' or 'glimmering') was a Greek prophetic sea-god, born mortal and turned immortal upon eating a magical herb. It was believed that he came to the rescue of sailors and fishermen in storms, having earlier earned a living from the sea himself.

== Family ==
Glaucus's parentage is different in the different traditions: (i) Nereus; (ii) Copeus; (iii) Polybus, son of Hermes, and Euboea, daughter of Larymnus; (iv) Anthedon and Alcyone; or Poseidon and the nymph Naïs.

Comparative table of Glaucus's family
Relation	Names	Sources				
Relation	Names	Euripides	Theolytus	Promathides	Mnaseas	Euanthes
Parentage	Nereus	✓				
Parentage	Copeus		✓			
Parentage	Polybus and Euboea			✓		
Parentage	Anthedon and Alcyone				✓	
Parentage	Poseidon and Naïs					✓

== Mythology ==
=== Origin ===
The story of Glaucus's apotheosis was dealt with in detail by Ovid in Metamorphoses and briefly referenced by many other authors. According to Ovid, Glaucus began his life as a mortal fisherman living in the Boeotian city of Anthedon. He found a magical herb which could bring the fish he caught back to life, and decided to try eating it. The herb made him immortal, but also caused him to grow fins instead of arms and a fish's tail instead of legs (though some versions say he simply became a merman-like being), forcing him to dwell forever in the sea. Glaucus was initially upset by this side-effect, but Oceanus and Tethys received him well and he was quickly accepted among the deities of the sea, learning from them the art of prophecy.

John Tzetzes adds to the above story that Glaucus became "immortal, but not immune to aging".

In an alternate, non-extant version cited in Athenaeus (with reference to Nicander's Aetolian History), Glaucus chased a hare on Mount Oreia until the animal fell down almost dead, then carried his prey to a spring and rubbed it with a bunch of grass that was growing about. The herb brought the hare back to life. Glaucus then tasted it himself and fell into a state of "divine madness", in which state Zeus made him fling himself into the stormy sea.

Athenaeus also informs that in yet another version followed by Possis of Magnesia, Glaucus (rather than Argus) was the builder and the pilot of Argo. During a naval battle between the Argonauts and the Etruscans, he fell into the sea and by the will of Zeus became a sea god.

==== The herb ====
Alexander the Aetolian, cited in Athenaeus, related that the magical herb grew on the island Thrinacia sacred to Helios and served as a remedy against fatigue for the sun god's horses. Aeschrion of Samos informed that it was known as the "dog's-tooth" and was believed to have been sown by Cronus.

=== Prophetic abilities ===
Athenaeus, referring to Aristotle's non-extant Constitution of Delos, related that Glaucus settled in Delos together with the Nereids and would give prophecies to whoever asked for them. He also mentions, this time with reference to Nicander, that Apollo was believed to have learned the art of prophecy from Glaucus.

==== Advisor to seafarers ====
An encounter of Glaucus with the Argonauts was described by Diodorus Siculus and Philostratus the Elder. When the Argonauts were caught in a storm, Orpheus addressed the Cabeiroi with prayer; the wind ceased, and Glaucus appeared. He followed the Argo for two days and prophesied to Heracles and the Dioscuri their future adventures and eventual deification. He addressed other members of the crew individually as well, especially noting that he was sent to them thanks to Orpheus's prayer, and instructing them to further pray to the Cabeiroi. In Apollonius Rhodius's version, Glaucus appeared at the point when Telamon quarreled with Jason over Heracles and Polyphemus being left behind on the coast of Bithynia where Hylas had been lost. Glaucus reconciled the two by letting them know that it had been ordained for Heracles to return to Eurystheus's court and complete his Twelve Labours, and for Polyphemus to found Cius, while Hylas had been abducted by a nymph and married her. Cf. also above for the version that made Glaucus an Argonaut himself.

In Euripides's play Orestes, Glaucus appeared in front of Menelaus on the latter's voyage home, announcing to him the death of his brother Agamemnon by the hand of Clytaemnestra.

=== Love life ===
According to Ovid and Hyginus, Glaucus fell in love with the beautiful nymph Scylla and wanted her for his wife, but she was appalled by his fish-like features and fled onto land when he tried to approach her. He asked the witch Circe for a potion to make Scylla fall in love with him, but Circe fell in love with him instead. She tried to win his heart with her most passionate and loving words, telling him to scorn Scylla and stay with her. But he replied that trees would grow on the ocean floor and seaweed would grow on the highest mountain before he would stop loving Scylla. In her anger, Circe poisoned the pool where Scylla bathed, transforming her into a terrible monster with twelve feet and six heads.

Euanthes and Theolytus of Methymna also recorded an affair between Glaucus and Ariadne: according to Athenaeus who cites these authors, Glaucus seduced Ariadne as she was abandoned by Theseus on Dia (Naxos). Dionysus then fought Glaucus over Ariadne and overpowered him, binding his hands and feet with grape vines; he, however, released Glaucus when the latter disclosed his own name and origin.

According to Mnaseas, cited by Athenaeus in his Deipnosophistae, Glaucus named the island of Syme after his wife, when they settled the island; according to Aeschrion of Samos, Glaucus was the lover of the semi-historical Hydne.

Glaucus was reported to have had male lovers as well: Nicander in Europia mentioned Nereus as one, while Hedylus of Samos (or Athens) wrote that it was out of love for Melicertes that Glaucus threw himself into the sea. Yet according to Nicanor of Cyrene's Change of Names, Glaucus and the deified Melicertes were one and the same.

It is not known if Glaucus had any children, but Pausanias mentions Glaucus of Carystus as an alleged descendant of Glaucus the sea god. Virgil seems to indicate the Cumaean Sibyl, Deiphobe, as a daughter of Glaucus.

In an iambic poem, Aeschrion of Samos relates that Glaucus became enamored of Hydne, the daughter of Scyllus, the famed diver from Scione.

== Cultural depictions ==
- Aeschylus wrote a play on Glaucus, entitled Glaucus Pontius ("Glaucus of the Sea"), now lost. A work entitled Glaucus also belonged to Callimachus (it is unclear though which Glaucus was its subject).
- In Book X of Plato's Republic (611C-D) where a mangled, wave-battered body of Glaucus, crusted with sea weeds, rocks, and barnacles, is likened to a soul plagued by all kinds of evil.
- The Roman author Velleius Paterculus made mention of Plancus, who performed in the role of Glaucus at a feast.
- Scylla et Glaucus, an opera by Jean-Marie Leclair, was based on the myth of Glaucus's love for Scylla recorded in Ovid.
- In Book 3 of "Endymion" by John Keats the story of Glaucus and Circe is retold.
