= Anthedon =

Anthedon may refer to:

== Places ==
- Anthedon (Boeotia), ancient city in Boeotia (continental Greece)
- Anthedon (Palestine), ancient port city and former bishopric near Gaza, now a Latin Catholic titular see

== Zoology ==
Any of three species of butterfly:

- Enodia anthedon
- Graphium anthedon
- Hypolimnas anthedon

== Other uses ==
- Anthedon (mythology), one of several mythical figures
- USS Anthedon (AS-24), a submarine tender of the US Navy
