= A. N. D. Haksar =

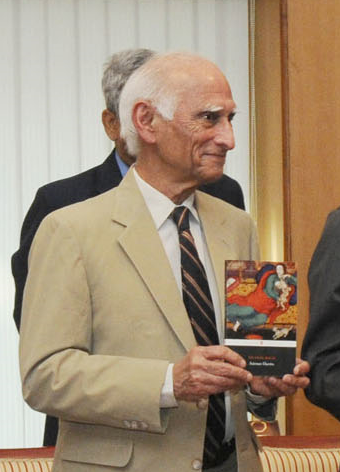
- A.N.D. Haksar in 2015
- Born: 3 December 1933 (age 92); Gwalior, British India
- Education: The Doon School; University of Allahabad; University of Oxford
- Occupations: Diplomat, translator, writer
- Writing career
- Language: English

Aditya Narayan Dhairyasheel Haksar (born 3 December 1933) is a translator of Sanskrit classics into English. Born in Gwalior, central India, he is a graduate of The Doon School, Allahabad University and Oxford University. He was a career diplomat, serving as Indian High Commissioner to Kenya and the Seychelles, Minister in the United States, Ambassador to Portugal and Yugoslavia, and he also served as Dean of India's Foreign Service Institute and President of the U.N. Environment Programme's Governing Council.

Haksar is noted for his collection of translations from Sanskrit. He has increasingly focused on the kathā or narrative Sanskrit literature, the manuscript archive of which may amount to some 40,000 volumes. This is in part because many generations of orientalist scholars had overlooked this rich tradition in favor of more ancient religious texts. His kathā translations include Shuka Saptati, and the first ever renditions into English of Madhavanala Katha and Samaya Matrika, respectively published as Madhav & Kama and The Courtesan's Keeper.

== List of works ==
=== Translated ===
1. Tales from the Panchatantra (1992)
2. The Shattered Thigh & Other Plays of Bhasa (1993)
3. Dandin's Tales of the Ten Princes (1995)
4. Fables from Narayana's Hitopadesha (1998)
5. the story collection Simhasana Dvatrimsika (1998)
6. Shuka Saptati- Seventy Tales of the Parrot (2000)
7. The Jatakamala of Arya Shura (2003) with a foreword by H.H. the Dalai Lama
8. Madhav and Kama - A Love Story from Ancient India (2006)
9. the verse anthology Subhashitavali (2007)
10. The Courtesan’s Keeper - Samaya Matrika of Kshemendra (2008)
11. Three Satires from Ancient Kashmir of Kshemendra (2011)
12. Vatsyayana's Kama Sutra (2011)
13. The Seduction of Shiva - Tales of Life and Love (2014)
14. Suleiman Charitra of Kalyana Malla (2015)
15. Raghuvamsam of Kalidasa (2016)
16. The Ending of Arrogance – Darpadalanam of Kshemendra (2016)
17. Three Hundred Verses of Bhartrihari (2017)
18. Ritusamharam – A Gathering of Seasons by Kalidasa (2018)
19. A Tale of Wonder – Kathakautukam by Srivara (2019)
20. Chankaya Niti - Verses on Life and Living (2020)
21. Vikramorvashiyam – Quest for Urvashi by Kalidasa (2021)

=== Edited ===
- Glimpses of Sanskrit Literature (1995) for the Indian Council for Cultural Relations.
- A Treasury of Sanskrit Poetry (2002) for the Indian Council for Cultural Relations.
