= Kamashastra =

Aspect of literature in India

In Indian literature, Kāma-Śāstra (कामशास्त्र ), refers to the tradition of works about kāma (broadly desire; particularly love, erotic, sensual and sexual desire in this case). Kāma-shastra aims to instruct the townsman (nāgarika) in the attainment of enjoyment and fulfillment.

== Etymology ==
Kāma (काम) is a Sanskrit word that has the general meanings of "wish", "desire", and "intention" in addition to the specific meanings of "pleasure" and "(sexual) love". Used as a proper name, it refers to Kamadeva, the Hindu god of love.

== History ==
The sage Śvetaketu produced a work too vast to be accessible. A scholar called Babhravya, together with his group of disciples, produced a summary of Śvetaketu's work, which nonetheless remained a huge and encyclopaedic tome. The name of the work was "One Hundred and Fifty Chapters Dealing with Kāma" and was divided into 7 parts.

Between the 3rd and 1st centuries BC, several authors reproduced different parts of Babhravya's work in various specialist treatises. Among the authors, those whose names are known are Charayana, Ghotakamukha, Gonardiya, Gonikaputra, Suvarnanabha, and Dattaka.

However, the oldest available text on this subject is the Kama Sutra ascribed to Vātsyāyana who is often erroneously called "Mallanaga Vātsyāyana". Yashodhara, in his commentary on the Kama Sutra, attributes the origin of erotic science to Mallanaga, the "prophet of the Asuras", implying that the Kama Sutra originated in prehistoric times. The attribution of the name "Mallanaga" to Vātsyāyana is due to the confusion of his role as editor of the Kama Sutra with the role of the mythical creator of erotic science. Vātsyāyana's birth date is not accurately known, but he must have lived earlier than the 7th century since he is referred to by Subandhu in his poem Vāsavadattā. Vātsyāyana was familiar with the Arthashastra of Kautilya.

Vātsyāyana refers to and quotes a number of texts on this subject, most of which have been lost.

Following Vātsyāyana, a number of authors wrote on Kāmashastra, some writing independent manuals of erotics, while others commented on Vātsyāyana. Later well-known works include Kokkaka's Ratirahasya (13th century) and Anangaranga of Kalyanamalla (16th century). The most well-known commentator on Vātsyāyana is Jayamangala (13th century).

== List of Kāma-shastra works ==
=== Lost works ===
- Kāmashāstra of Nandi or Nandikeshvara. (1000)
- Vātsyāyanasūtrasara, by Kshemendra: eleventh-century commentary on the Kama Sutra.

=== Chapters ===
- Kāmashāstra, by Auddalaki Shvetaketu (500 chapters).
- Kāmashāstra or Bābhravyakārikā.
- Kāmashāstra, by Chārāyana.
- Kāmashāstra, by Gonikāputra.
- Kāmashāstra, by Dattaka.
- Kāmashāstra or Ratinirnaya, by Suvarnanāb.
- Kama Sutra, by Vatsayana.
  - Jayamangala or Jayamangla, by Yashodhara: important commentary on the Kama Sutra.
  - Jaya, by Devadatta Shāstrī: a twentieth-century Hindi commentary on the Kama Sutra.
  - Sūtravritti, by Naringha Shastri: eighteenth-century commentary on the Kama Sutra.

=== Medieval and modern texts ===
==== Texts up to 10th century CE ====
- Kuchopanisad, by Kuchumara (tenth century).
- Kuttanimata, by the eighth-century Kashmiri poet Damodaragupta (Dāmodaragupta's Kuṭṭanīmata, though often included in lists of this sort, is really a novel written in Sanskrit verse, in which an aged bawd [kuṭṭanī] named Vikarālā gives advice to a young, beautiful, but as yet unsuccessful courtesan of Benares; most of the advice comes in the form of two long moral tales, one about a heartless and therefore successful courtesan, Mañjarī, and the other about a tender-hearted and therefore foolish girl, Hāralatā, who makes the mistake of falling in love with a client and eventually dies of a broken heart.)
- Mānasollāsa or Abhilashitartha Chintāmani by King Someshvara or Somadeva III of the Chālukya dynasty by Kalyāni. A part of this encyclopedia, the Yoshidupabhoga, is devoted to the Kāma-shastra. (Manasolasa or Abhilashitachintamani).

==== Texts post 11th century CE ====
- Anangaranga, by Kalyanmalla; 15th-16th century text.
- Kāmasamuha, by Ananta (fifteenth century).
- Nagarasarvasva or Nagarsarvasva, by Bhikshu Padmashrī, a tenth- or eleventh-century Buddhist.
- Panchashāyaka, Panchasakya, or Panchsayaka, by Jyotirīshvara Kavishekhara (fourteenth century).
- Ratirahasya, by Kokkoka; 11th-12th century CE text.
  - Janavashya by Kallarasa: based on Kakkoka's Ratirahasya.
- Ratiratnapradīpika, by Praudha Devarāja, fifteenth-century Maharaja of Vijayanagara.
- Samayamatrka, a satire by the 11th century poet Ksemendra.

==== Others ====
- Dattakasūtra, by King Mādhava II of the Ganga dynasty of Mysore.
- Kandarpacudamani
- Kuchopanishad or Kuchumāra Tantra, by Kuchumāra.
- Rasamanjari or Rasmanjari, by the poet Bhānudatta.
- Ratikallolini, by Dikshita Samaraja.
- Smaradīpika, by Minanatha.
  - Ratimanjari, by the poet Jayadeva: a synthesis of the Smaradīpika by Minanatha.
- Shrngaradipika, by Harihar.
- Shringararasaprabandhadīpika, by Kumara Harihara.
- Smarapradīpika or Smara Pradipa, by Gunākara (son of Vachaspati).

== Kāma-shastra and kāvya poetry ==
The Kāma-shastra have an intimate connection with Sanskrit ornate poetry (kāvya). Kāvya poets were supposed to be proficient in the Kāma-shastra as it governs the approach to love and sex in kāvya poetry.
