= Aeschrion =

Aeschrion may refer to a number of different people in Classical history:

- Aeschrion of Syracuse, assisted Verres in robbing the Syracusans
- Aeschrion of Samos, iambic poet
- Aeschrion of Mytilene, epic poet, possibly identical with Aeschrion of Samos
- Aeschrion of Pergamon, 2nd century physician
