= Dius =

Set of mythological Greek characters

In Greek mythology and history, the name Dius (Ancient Greek: Δῖος, Dios, "divine") may refer to the following:

== Mythology ==
- Dius, possible name for the man of Metapontum to whom Melanippe, mother-to-be of Aeolus and Boeotus by Poseidon, was handed over.
- Dius, son of Anthas and father of Anthedon.
- Dius, a son of Apollo and possible father of Melite.
- Dius, son of Pandorus and eponym of the city Dion in Euboea.
- Dius, a son of Priam. He fell in the Trojan War.
- Dius, a Dorian leader who rivaled with Oxylus over the land of Elis, and eventually was beaten.

== History ==
- Dius, ancient historian of Phoenicia cited by Josephus
- Dios (7th century BC?), Pythagorean philosopher
