= Anthas =

In Greek mythology, Anthas or Anthes (Ancient Greek: Ἄνθας, Ἄνθης, romanized: Ánthas, Ánthes) was a son of Poseidon and Alcyone, and brother of Hyperes. The brothers were eponymous founders and first kings of the cities Hyperea and Anthea in a region they reigned over; later on these two cities were merged into the historical Troezen. Anthas was father of at least two sons, Aëtius and Dius, of whom Aëtius was the successor to both his father and uncle, and further co-ruled with Pittheus and Troezen. The descendants of Anthas through Aëtius reputedly founded colonies in Caria: Halicarnassus and Myndus, and accordingly the people of Halicarnassus were referred to by the poetic epithet Antheades 'descendants of Anthas'. Alternately, Halicarnassus was founded by Anthas himself. Anthas also was the presumed eponym of Anthedon, over which he was said to have reigned, and of Anthana in Laconia.

== See also ==
- Anthus
