= Philaenis =

Author of an ancient sex manual

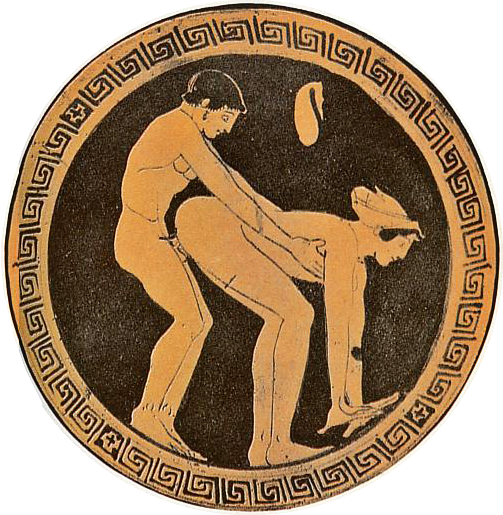
Philaenis was said to have written a sex manual containing descriptions of various sexual positions. This red-figure kylix painting from c. 480–470 BC depicts a man having sexual intercourse with a hetaira, a kind of ancient Greek prostitute.

Philaenis of Samos (Note: Ancient Greek: Φιλαινίς ἡ Σαμία) was supposedly the author of a famous ancient sex manual. According to a surviving fragment of a treatise which claims to have been written by her, she was from Samos, and her father was called Ocymenes. However, many modern scholars consider "Philaenis" a fictional character whose persona may have been adopted by a variety of erotic writers. Two satirical Greek epigrams from the Palatine Anthology by the poets Aeschrion of Samos and Dioscorides purport to defend Philaenis's reputation by insisting that she did not write the treatise attributed to her. Aeschrion instead insists that the treatise was written by the Athenian sophist Polycrates. The reputed writings of Philaenis were well known throughout classical antiquity and scholars believe that they may have influenced Ovid's Ars Amatoria.

In later times, Philaenis was remembered for her reputation of licentiousness. A fictional character named Philaenis appears in the Epigrams of the Roman poet Martial as a masculine woman known for having sex with women. The Christian writers Justin Martyr, Tatian, and Clement of Alexandria deplore the writings attributed to Philaenis as depraved and immoral. The fourth-century AD Pseudo-Lucianic dialogue Erōtes references Philaenis using a strap-on dildo to have sex with women. It was through these later allusions that Philaenis was best known for most of modernity and she is referenced in works by the English authors Thomas Heywood and John Donne, who both characterized her as a sexual deviant. In 1972, three brief fragments of a treatise claiming to have been written by Philaenis were published, which had been previously discovered at Oxyrhynchus as part of the Oxyrhynchus Papyri.

== Early references ==
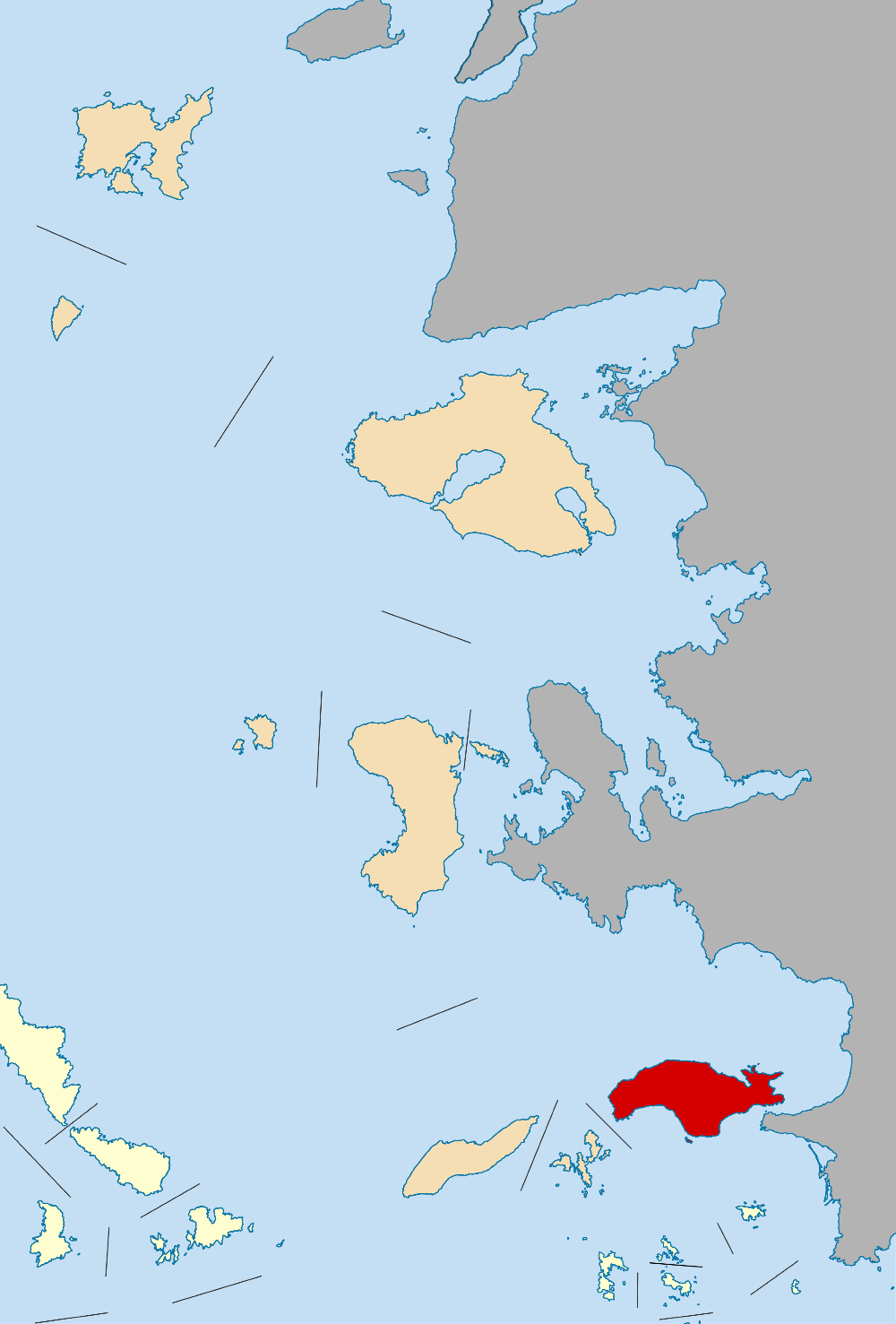
Philaenis is said to have come from the island of Samos, which was associated with prostitution in antiquity.

Philaenis is the most frequently named of the ancient women who had an erotic treatise attributed to them and she is mentioned in a dozen ancient sources. According to one of the surviving fragments of the treatise from Oxyrhynchus, the work was written by "Philaenis the Samian, daughter of Ocymenes" – though Athenaeus calls her "Leucadian". Her mother's name is sometimes given as Gyllina. Modern scholars generally believe that Philaenis is a fictional character who was used as a persona, possibly by several different erotic writers.

It is commonly assumed among modern scholars that the Philaenis persona was one of a courtesan. According to Ian Michael Plant, the name Philaenis – a diminutive of "philaina", the feminine form of the Greek word "philos", meaning "love" – seems to have been commonly used by prostitutes in ancient Greece. Her association with Samos is also appropriate for a prostitute; in antiquity, the island was famous for its expensive hetairai. D. W. Thomson Vessey states that Philaenis is a fictional character representing a "prototypical harlot". Sandra Boehringer vehemently rejects the view of Philaenis as a courtesan, insisting that there is no evidence to support the argument that the name Philaenis was any kind of "courtesan's name" or that anyone ever thought of Philaenis as a courtesan in antiquity, instead arguing that the ancients merely regarded her as sexually debauched.

=== In the Palatine Anthology ===
Two poems in the Palatine Anthology – one by Aeschrion of Samos, the other by the third-century BC poet Dioscorides – purport to deny that Philaenis wrote the work attributed to her. Aeschrion sets the epigram on Philaenis's tomb by the sea, but does not specify where the tomb is located. In the epigram, Philaenis herself is portrayed as directly addressing a μάταιος ναύτης ("aimless sailor"), but the addressee is not explicitly identified as a ξένος ("foreigner"). Sailors in antiquity were notorious for their bawdiness and womanizing, so Aeschrion may have intended for the addressee of the epigram to be an ironic one. Aeschrion portrays Philaenis as vehemently insisting that she never wrote the book attributed to her. Instead, she attributes the work to a man named Polycrates, who is most likely the Athenian sophist by that name, though this is not certain.

Dioscorides's poem likewise vehemently denies that Philaenis really wrote the treatise attributed to her, but, unlike Aeschrion's, it does not attempt to suggest another individual as the author. According to D. W. Thomson Vessey, it is possible that Dioscorides may have intended this defense as a tacit endorsement of Aeschrion's attribution of the treatise to Polycrates. Also unlike Aeschrion, Dioscorides explicitly identifies Philaenis as a Samian. Neither epigram attempts to dispute the existence of the treatise in question. Tsantsanolou agrees with Aeschrion's attribution of the work to Polycrates, arguing that it is consistent with what is known of his style. Boehringer argues that both Aeschrion and Dioscorides's epigrams are satirical and, far from defending Philaenis, they actually propagate her negative reputation, noting that, while nothing is known about Aeschrion, over forty epigrams by Dioscorides have survived, many of which are overtly satirical. She sees the construction of the epigrams, in which Philaenis is portrayed as describing at length what she supposedly is not rather than what she "really" is, as indicative of the poems' ironic intents.

=== Treatise from Oxyrhynchus ===
Fragments of a work claiming to have been written by Philaenis were discovered at Oxyrhynchus and published in 1972 as P. Oxy. 2891. Although the book was formerly believed to have been a monograph on sexual positions, the discovered fragments suggest that the scope of the work was much broader; according to Edgar Lobel, it appears to have been rather "a systematic exposition of ars amatoria". The work does not seem to have been intended as a serious instruction manual, but rather as a parody of the genre.

The work is written in straightforward, everyday language and makes no attempt at literary artifice. It is divided into well-organized sections, each of which deals with a particular topic. Though Philaenis, purportedly the author of the work, was from Samos, the surviving portion of the work contains very few Ionic forms. This may be a result of the fact that, by the fourth century, when the work was probably written, Koine was starting to become the prevalent dialect in formerly Ionic-speaking areas of Greece. Alternatively, since "Philaenis" is likely to be a pseudonym for the true author, it is more probable that only a few Ionic forms were needed in order to lend superficial verisimilitude to the work.

Three fragments of the manual from Oxyrhynchus attributed to Philaenis have survived. All of them are exceedingly brief and the handwriting on them is barely legible in some places; in the second of the three fragments, only five letters can be securely identified. The fragments come from the very beginning of a scroll of papyrus, which was divided into two parallel columns. The first column begins with a preamble describing Philaenis's work:

Philaenis the Samian, daughter of Ocymenes, composed this book for those who wish to live their life with knowledge gained scientifically, not unprofessionally. She toiled...

The second and third fragments come from the beginning of the second column on the scroll:

On Seductions: Now, the seducer must come to the woman untidy and uncombed, so that he does not seem to the woman to be a man who takes much trouble...

[On Flattery]: ...with the intention..., while he says that she... is equal to a goddess, that she who is ugly is as lovely as Aphrodite and that she who is older is as Rhea.

On Kissing: ...

Boehringer states that the discovery of these fragments only prove that a genre of sexual writings existed in antiquity and emphasizes that this treatise does not prove that Philaenis herself was a real person or that there was ever an "original" sex manual written by her.

== Later allusions ==
=== First-century Latin ===
The structure of the treatise attributed to Philaenis resembles that of the later poetic Ars Amatoria by the Roman poet Ovid and it is generally thought that Ovid probably drew on it for inspiration. To the ancient Romans, Philaenis and her writings symbolized the perceived profligacy of the Greek cities of Asia Minor. Philaenis is mentioned in the Priapeia, a collection of Latin poems originally associated with cultic statues of the god Priapus and later collected during the first century AD. In one of these poems, narrated in the first-person by Priapus himself, the god lists his misfortunates:

There comes in addition to these things the sign of shamelessness, this obelisque erected by my lecherous limb. Right up to it, the puella – I almost said her name – is accustomed to come with the one who shags her (cum suo fututore), and, if she has not completed all the positions described by Philaenis (tot figuris, quas Philaenis enarrat), she leaves, still itching for it (pruriosa).

According to Boehringer, this poem indicates that girls, or puellae in Latin, may have read some kind of writings or discourses attributed to Philaenis. This passage also associates Philaenis with both knowledge of sex and sexual excessiveness.

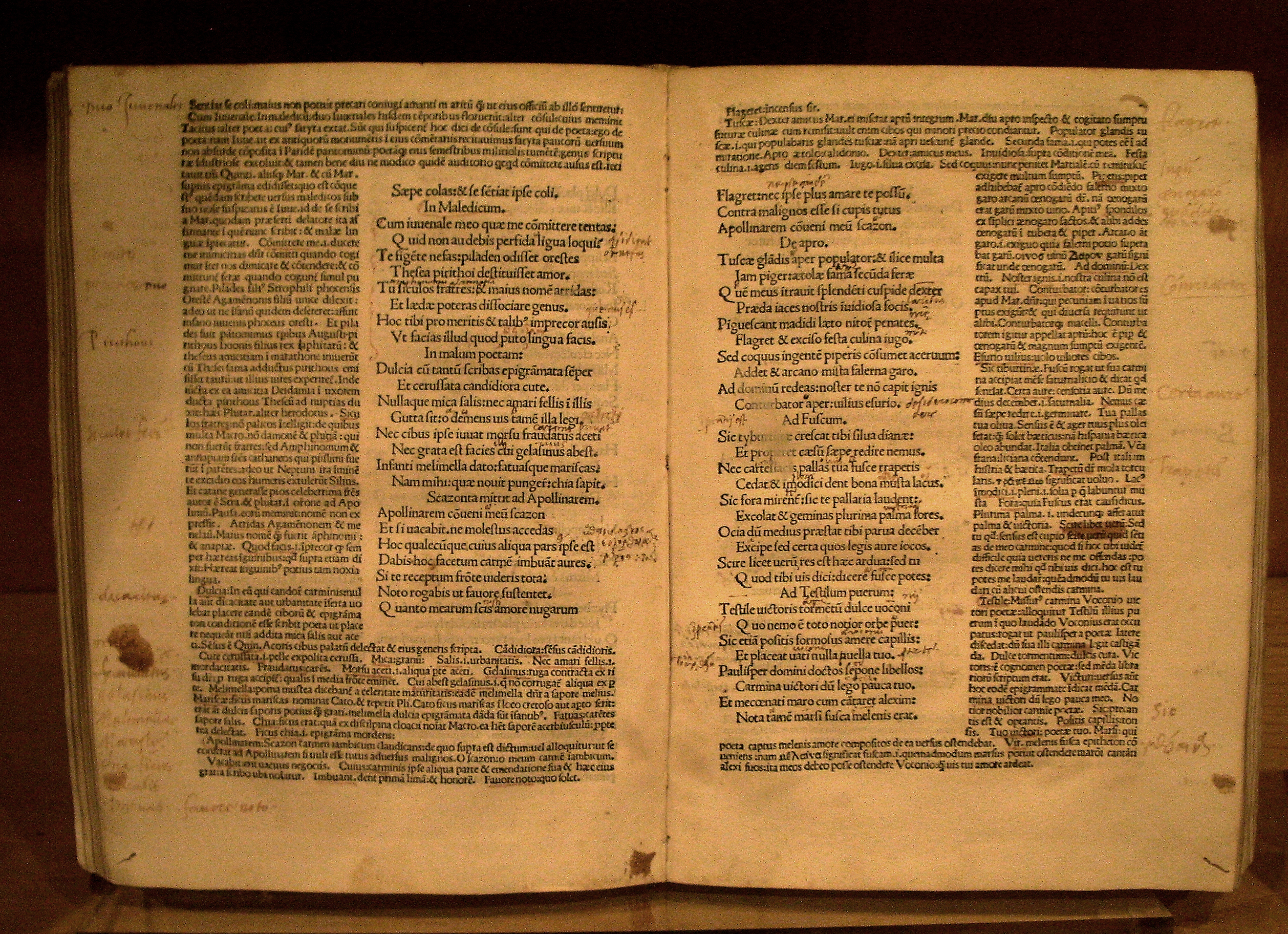
1490 Latin edition of Martial's Epigrams, which, prior to the discovery of P. Oxy. 2891, were one of the main sources of information about Philaenis

The Roman epigrammatist Martial, who wrote in the late first century AD, uses a fictional character named Philaenis in his satires, who may have been partially based on the persona of Philaenis of Samos. Martial's Philaenis is portrayed as figure of his own time, not as a person from the distant past. She is described a stereotypical tribade, who sodomizes boys, has sex with women, engages in cunnilingus, and lifts weights. In epigram 7.67.1, Martial introduces Philaenis, declaring:

Martial's original Latin

Pedicat pueros tribas Philaenis
et tentigine saevior mariti
undenas dolat in die puellas.

English translation by Harriette Andreadis

That tribade Philaenis sodomizes boys,
and with more rage than a husband in his stiffened lust,
she works eleven girls roughly every day.

Epigram 7.70 mocks Philaenis for her inappropriate virility, protesting:

Martial's original Latin

Ipsarum tribadum tribas, Philaeni,
recte quam futuis, vocas amicam.

English translation by Harriette Andreadis

You, Philaenis, tribade to tribades,
rightly call friend her whom you fuck.

Martial ironically describes Philaenis refusing to perform fellatio because it was "unmanly", but yet engaging in cunnilingus, an activity which Martial deems so utterly feminine that only the most demented person would consider it manly. Martial emphasizes Philaenis's Greek character by peppering his epigrams against her with Greek phrases and loanwords, such as harpasto ("handball"), haphe ("yellow sand"), halteras ("jumping weights"), palaestra ("wrestling ring"), and colyphia ("meat dishes"). His descriptions of Philaenis and other masculine women bear close similarities to the descriptions found in the writings of the poet Seneca the Younger, who lived about a generation before Martial, and indicate that Martial was probably drawing inspiration either from Seneca himself or from the same tradition from which Seneca also drew his inspiration.

=== Late antiquity ===
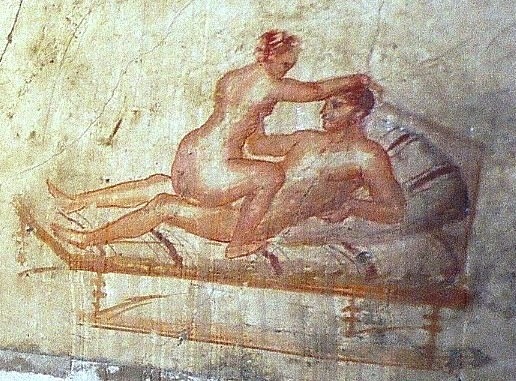
Erotic wall painting discovered in a small room at the side of the kitchen of the House of the Vettii in Pompeii. The Church Father Clement of Alexandria deplores people who displayed paintings of sex acts inspired by the writings of Philaenis in their homes.

In late antiquity, Philaenis became the object of scorn and disapproval from Christian Church Fathers. In the second century AD, the Christian apologist Justin Martyr references the writings of Philaenis as works that provide people with shameful education. The theologian Tatian mentions the works of Philaenis and Elephantis as examples of horrible creations. Clement of Alexandria deplores those who display paintings inspired by the works of Philaenis as though they were portrayals of the Labors of Heracles. According to Vessey, Clement's equation of Philaenis's sex positions with the Labors of Heracles implies that he believed only a gymnast with "Herculean powers" could actually have sex in the positions described by her.

The fourth-century AD Pseudo-Lucianic dialogue Erōtes cites Philaenis as an example of "tribadic licentiousness" and claims that she used a strap-on dildo for the sake of "androgynous loves". A scholium on the passage remarks that Philocrates, an Athenian comic playwright, had described Philaenis as a hetairistria and a tribas ("tribade"). This is the only known reference to a comic playwright by this name.

=== Modernity ===
Philaenis was vaguely remembered during the early modern period for her reputation as a wanton woman. In his Gynaikeion, or Nine Books of Various History Concerning Women (1624), the English author Thomas Heywood describes Philaenis as a "strumpet of Leucadia" and credits her with having invented kataklysis (douching). Heywood omits reference to the lewd sexual activities Philaenis was accused of having performed because the Gynaikeion was written for a female audience and he believed such obscenities were inappropriate for women to read about. Instead, he refers the reader to the writings of the Italian scholar Gyraldus for further information, knowing that few of his female readers would attempt to seek it out. Gyraldus, in turn, refers the reader to Martial, whose writings were only available in Latin and, since Latin was normally only taught to men, that meant that only men would be able to read them. John Donne's erotic epistle "Sapho to Philaenis" is written as a love letter, in which the Lesbian lyric poet Sappho anachronistically professes her love to Philaenis, spurning the affections of her male lover Phaon.

== See also ==
- Astyanassa
- Elephantis
- The Songs of Bilitis
