= Sandstone Ranch =

Sandstone Ranch may refer to:

- Sandstone Ranch (Colorado), an historic place in Longmont, Colorado
- Sandstone Ranch (Nevada), an historic place in Clark County, Nevada
- Sandstone Retreat, a former sexually open community for swingers in California in existence between 1969 and 1976
