= Vishnugupta =

Vishnugupta may refer to:

- Kaundinya or Vishnugupta, a rishi (seer) of ancient India
- Vishnugupta or Kautilya, writer of the ancient Indian treatise Arthashastra
  - Chanakya (fl. 4th century BC), ancient Indian royal advisor, traditionally identified with Vishnugupta/Kautilya
- Vishnugupta (Gupta Empire), king of the Gupta Empire 540–550 CE
- Vishnu-gupta, a character in the 11th-century Indian story collection Shringara-manjari-katha

== See also ==
- Vishnu Gupta, founder in 2011 and leader of Hindu Sena, an Indian right-wing organization
