= Salganeus =

- Σαλγανεύς (Ancient Greek)
- Salganea
- Location within Greece
- 38°28′47″N 23°30′58″E
- Location: Near Lithosoros, Boeotia, Greece
- Region: Ancient Boeotia

Salganeus (Ancient Greek: Σαλγανεύς) or Salganea was a town upon the eastern coast of ancient Boeotia, and between Chalcis and Anthedon. The name Salganeus is derived from a Boeotian, who served as pilot to the Persian fleet of Xerxes I, and was put to death upon suspicion of treachery, because no outlet appeared to the channel of the Euripus; but the Persian commander, having found out his mistake, erected a monument on the spot, where the town was afterwards built. Salganeus was considered an important place from its commanding the northern entrance to the Euripus. The god Apollo had the epithet Salganeus (Σαλγανεύς) because of the town.

Its site is located near modern Lithosoros.
