= Charles Silverstein =

American LGBTQ activist (1935–2023)

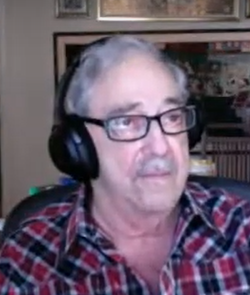
- Silverstein during a 2021 video conference
- Born: Charles C. Silverstein; April 23, 1935; New York City, U.S.
- Died: January 30, 2023 (aged 87); New York City, U.S.
- Education: State University of New York at New Paltz; City College of New York; Rutgers University
- Known for: Homosexuality and psychology; Gay men's sex education; LGBT psychology
- Spouse: Bill Bartelt (m. 2017; div. 2019)
- Partner: William Bory (died 1993)
- Awards: Gold Medal Award for Life Achievement in the Practice of Psychology (2011); GLMA's Achievement Award (2017); Lifetime Achievement Social Justice Award (2022)
- Scientific career
- Fields: Psychology
- Workplaces: American Psychological Association
- Thesis: The Relationship of Attitude Change to the Complexity of the Environment, the Message, and Conceptual Structure
- Doctoral advisor: Peter Suedfeld

Charles Silverstein (April 23, 1935 – January 30, 2023) was an American writer, therapist, and LGBT rights advocate. He was best known for his presentation as a graduate student before the American Psychiatric Association in 1973 that led to the removal of homosexuality as a mental illness from the organization's Diagnostic and Statistical Manual. He was also the founding editor-in-chief of the Journal of Homosexuality.

== Biography ==
Charles C. Silverstein was born at Beth-El Hospital to a Jewish family in Brooklyn, New York City, on April 23, 1935. His father was a newspaper deliveryman, and his mother was a homemaker. He recalled his family experiencing antisemitism early in his life. The family attempted to move to Los Angeles in 1946. There his father was fired; he recalled that his father's co-workers had threatened strike action if the boss would not fire "that Jew". After this, the family moved back to Brooklyn. Silverstein studied education at the State University of New York at New Paltz, receiving his degree in 1959. He then became a teacher at Chatsworth Avenue School, an elementary school in Larchmont, for six years.

He attended high school at the School of Industrial Art in Manhattan, New York City. He then studied at the City College of New York in clinical psychology for three years, but later became a student at Rutgers University. He joined the Gay Activists Alliance (GAA) in 1972; he later remarked that it was "an organization that many people will tell you it saved their lives, and I think it did for me." He also led student protests against the Vietnam War. In 1973, as a Rutgers University graduate student and member of the GAA, he provided a key testimony (in which he utilized satire) to the American Psychological Association opposing the classification of homosexuality as a mental illness. Silverstein was one of several speakers who attended the panel: while he provided testimony from a psychologist's perspective, Jean O'Leary gave testimony at the same event from a commoner's perspective. In a 2003 interview he said, "I threw back at them their diagnoses over the decades and how funny it all sounds now, and pointed out that their fun had hurt a lot of people." That same year, Silverstein came out as gay to his mother.

He later earned his PhD in social psychology from Rutgers University in 1974. After graduating from Rutgers University, he opened a private psychology practice. His essays and professional papers have been published widely in journals and anthologies. In 1977, Silverstein and Edmund White co-authored The Joy of Gay Sex, described by The Advocate as a "landmark" sex manual that has "educated generations of gay men". In one of his last interviews, Silverstein told the LGBTQ&A podcast in 2021, "When Ed and I first sat down to talk about the book and we made a list of the entries, it was quite clear that a majority of the entries were not about sex, it was about community and it was about relating to each other. While most people think of all the dirty pictures, what we always thought our greatest contribution was, is trying to write something that we would've wanted when we were kids, and that would be something more than just sex. That would be about community."

Silverstein was the founding director of the Institute for Human Identity, and the Identity House in New York City. He was the founding editor of the Journal of Homosexuality. He was a member of the American Psychological Association and was made a Fellow in 1987. He was also a member of Division 44 of the APA (Society for the Psychological Study of Lesbian, Gay, Bisexual and Transgender Issues), the New York State Psychological Association (NYSPA), and the Committee on Ethical Practices of NYSPA. He was a frequent lecturer at conventions on both the state and national levels, author of eight books and many professional papers, and has received many awards from the American Psychological Association.

He advocated against conversion therapy, particularly aversion therapy. In 1995, he discussed the prospect of a cure for homosexuality to The New York Times, saying: "At most, it allows a person to develop some kind of relationship with a woman that most of the time will end badly. Even if it doesn't, the gay man invariably feels like a failure." In 2012, he told The Gay & Lesbian Review Worldwide that the "amount of damage that has been done by the psychological and psychiatry professions to help people change — I see it every day at my practice... I think aversion therapy is a form of torture. I think that psychiatrists of that period enjoyed setting up a sado-masochist relationship between them and their patients."

Silverstein died at his home in Manhattan on January 30, 2023, at age 87; According to his executor Aron Berlinger, Silverstein had been diagnosed with lung cancer.

=== Recognition ===
Silverstein received the Gold Medal Award for Life Achievement in the Practice of Psychology from the American Psychological Association in 2011, for "his 40-year career challenging the criteria of social morality as the basis for diagnosing sexual disorders", "his presentation before the American Psychiatric Association to eliminate homosexuality as a mental disorder", "his founding two counseling centers for lesbian, gay, bisexual, and transgender (LGBT) people in order to deliver unbiased treatment", and "his founding of the Journal of Homosexuality."

He was also featured in Cured, a documentary film detailing the history of declassifying homosexuality as a mental illness. In 2017, he received an Achievement Award from GLMA: Health Professionals Advancing LGBT Equality. In 2022, he received the Lifetime Achievement Social Justice Award from the Association for Behavioral and Cognitive Therapies.

== Works ==
=== Books ===
- The Joy of Gay Sex, co-authored with Edmund White (1977).
- A Family Matter: A Parents' Guide to Homosexuality (1977).
- Man to Man: Gay Couples in America (1982).
- Psychological and Medical Treatments of Homosexuality, published as a chapter in Homosexuality: Research Implications for Public Policy (1991).
- Gays, Lesbians and Their Therapists: Studies in Psychotherapy (1991).
- The New Joy of Gay Sex, co-authored with Felice Picano (1992).
- History of Treatment, published as a chapter in Textbook of Homosexuality and Mental Health (1996).
- The Origins of the Gay Psychotherapy Movement, published as a chapter in A Queer World: The Center for Lesbian and Gay Studies Reader (1997).
- The Initial Psychotherapy Interview: A Gay Man Seeks Treatment (2011).
- For the Ferryman: A Personal History (2011), Second Edition (2022).

=== Journal articles ===
- "Even Psychiatry Can Profit From Its Past Mistakes" (Winter 1976–1977). Journal of Homosexuality. 2 (2): pages 153–158.
- Homosexuality and the Ethics of Behavioral Intervention: Paper 2 (Spring 1977). Journal of Homosexuality. 2 (3): pages 205–211.
- The Ethical and Moral Implications of Sexual Classification: A Commentary (1984). Journal of Homosexuality. 9 (4): pages 29–38. Also published as a chapter in Gay Personality And Sexual Labeling (1985).
- The Borderline Personality Disorder and Gay People (1988). Journal of Homosexuality. 15 (1–2): pages 185–212. Also published as a chapter in The Treatment of Homosexuals With Mental Health Disorders (1988) and Affirmative Dynamic Psychotherapy with Gay Men (1993).
- Facilitating Support Groups for Professionals Working with People with AIDS (March 1993). Social Work. 38 (2): pages 144–151. Co-authored with Arnold H. Grossman.
- The Religious Conversion of Homosexuals: Subject Selection Is the 'Voir Dire' of Psychological Research (2003). Journal of Gay & Lesbian Psychotherapy. 7 (3): pages 31–53.
- Wearing Two Hats: The Psychologist as Activist and Therapist (2007). Journal of Gay & Lesbian Psychotherapy. 11 (3–4): pages 9–35. Also published as a chapter in Activism and LGBT Psychology (2007).
- Are You Saying Homosexuality Is Normal? (October 11, 2008). Journal of Gay & Lesbian Mental Health. 12 (3): pages 277–287.

=== Letters and editorials ===
- Editorial (1974). Journal of Homosexuality. 1 (1): pages 5–7.
- Book Review For "Positively Gay" (January 1980). Book Reviews. SIECUS Report. SIECUS. 8 (3): pages 6–7.
- Book Review For "Counseling With Gay Men and Women: A Guide For Facilitating Positive Life-Styles" (September 1981). Book Reviews. SIECUS Report. SIECUS. 10 (1): pages 22–23.
- The Implications of Removing Homosexuality from the DSM as a Mental Disorder (November 11, 2008). Letter to the Editor. Archives of Sexual Behavior. 38 (2): pages 161–163.

== See also ==
- LGBT culture in New York City
- LGBT people in science
- List of LGBT people from New York City
- NYC Pride March
