= Hydna =

Hydna of Scione (alternately called Hydne or Cyana) (Ancient Greek: Ὕδνα; fl. 480 BC) was an Ancient Greek swimmer and diver given credit for contributing to the destruction of the Persian navy in 480 BC.

== Biography ==
According to Pausanias (Description of Greece, 10.19.1.), prior to the battle of Salamis. a critical naval battle with the Persians, Hydna and her father, Scyllias, volunteered to assist Greek forces by vandalizing the nearby Persian naval fleet. After reaching Greece, Persian king Xerxes I had moored his ships off the coast of Mount Pelion to wait out a storm prior to the Battle of Artemisium. Hydna was well known in Greece as a skilled swimmer, having been trained by her father, a professional swim instructor named Scyllias, from a young age. She was known for her ability to swim long distances and dive deep into the ocean.

On the night of the attack, father and daughter swam roughly ten miles through rough, choppy waters to reach the ships. They silently swam among the boats, using knives to cut the moorings and dragging away the submerged anchors. Without anchors and moorings to secure the ships, they crashed together in the stormy water. Most of the ships sustained considerable damage and a few sank. The resulting delay allowed the Greek navy more time to prepare in Artemisium and ultimately led to a victory for Greek forces at Salamis.

In another chronicle by Herodotus, Scyllias was actually working for the Persians as a diver, recovering a great part of the treasure sunk in the storm before deserting for the Greek side. He supposedly swam submerged from Aphetae to Artemisium, possibly using a primitive snorkel or a stolen boat, and brought the Greeks information about the Persian fleet. This story implies he was a Greek double agent in the Persian fleet, which he would have sabotaged with Hydna and benefitted professionally from before absconding.

In gratitude for the heroism shown by Hydna and her father, the Amphictyons dedicated statues to them at Delphi, the most sacred site of the Greek world. Pausanias tells us that "beside the statue of Gorgias is a votive offering of the Amphictyons towards father and daughter". It is thought that Roman emperor Nero plundered her statue and returned with it to Rome in the first century AD.

In an iambic poem, Aeschrion of Samos relates that the sea-god Glaucus became enamored of Hydne.

== Cultural depictions ==
Hydna appears in Elva Sophronia Smith's 1954 novel Adventure Calls.

Scyllias appears in the 2014 film 300: Rise of an Empire portrayed by Callan Mulvey, though Hydna does not, being replaced by a male son named Calisto (Jack O'Connell).
