= Shringara-manjari-katha =

- Author: Bhoja or another author under his patronage
- Original title: शृंगार मंजरी कथा / शृङ्गार मञ्जरी कथा
- Translator: Kalpalata Munshi
- Language: Sanskrit
- Publication date: 11th century
- Publication place: Paramara kingdom, India
- English publication date: 1959

Shringara-manjari-katha (IAST: Śṛṅgāra-mañjarī-kathā, "Stories for Shringara-manjari") is an 11th-century Sanskrit-language storybook from India. Attributed to king Bhoja, it has been partially recovered from a fragmentary manuscript. It contains a frame story, in which a courtesan's mother instructs her daughter on how to deal with men of various characters, through 13 sub-stories.

== Manuscript ==
Shringara-manjari-katha is known from a fragmentary palm-leaf manuscript found at the Jaisalmer Jnana Bhandara (or Brihad-Jnana-Kosha), a Jain repository. The manuscript is written in Devanagari script in black ink, and the characters indicate use of a reed pen. Based on the page numbers, it appears that the complete text was written on 158 leaves, each measuring 11.7 x 2 inches. Out of these, 16 leaves are missing and 26 leaves are fragmented. The leaves are divided into two pages, with string holes in the centre. Generally, there are six lines on a page, but some narrow leaves have only five lines. The lines are written on both sides of the leaves, and each line contains 52-55 letters.

The scribe appears to have been well-versed with the writing technique, but not with the language. He made several grammatical and other textual mistakes, which may have resulted from carelessness or a defective source manuscript. The scribe has corrected a small number of errors by altering, canceling, or inserting letters. For example, an altered letter is indicated by two minor strokes.

The manuscript has a sentence mentioning the date of composition in the Shaka era, but the portion that mentions the date is lost. Other manuscripts with same handwriting were discovered in the same collection, but they are also undated. The style of writing matches with the style used in other manuscripts dated to 11th and 12th centuries. Based on this, and the condition of the leaves, the manuscript can be dated to 12th century or earlier.

== Critical edition ==
In 1874, Indologist Georg Bühler noticed the manuscript, and described it in a short paragraph. In 1916, C. D. Dalal listed it in his Catalogue Of Manuscripts in the Jesalmere Bhandaras. In 1941, M. Krishnamachariar attempted to obtain the manuscript, but the Dewan of the Jaisalmer State replied that the manuscript had several missing and unnumbered pages, and some of its pages were mixed with another manuscript.

In 1942, Jain scholar Muni Jinvijay spent five months in Jaisalmer to examine various manuscripts. He found 15-20 palm leaves in the Shringara-manjari-katha manuscript, and had them copied. Later, he found several palm leaves in same handwriting while checking other manuscripts. He consolidated all the surviving palm leaves belonging to the Shringara-manjari-katha manuscript.

In 1945, Jinvijay asked his Ph.D. student Kalpalata Munshi to work on a critical edition of the text. Munshi's edition and translation was published in 1959, by the Bharatiya Vidya Bhavan. She corrected several scribal mistakes, and added punctuation and paragraphs for easier reading. She did not translate the small fragments, and the twelfth story, which is lost.

== Authorship ==
The text names the Paramara king Bhoja (r.c. 1010–1055 CE) as its author. The first four stanzas of the work pay homage to Sarasvati, and the fifth stanza mentions Bhoja-raja as the author. The concluding verse again names Maharajadhiraja Parameshvara Shri (royal title) Bhoja-deva as the author. The colophon of each story in the book also names Bhoja as its author. The story is set in Bhoja's capital, Dhara, and greatly praises the city.

Bhoja was known as a patron of scholars and poets, and according to some scholars, several works attributed to him were actually written by his courtiers. Kalpalata Munshi asserts that Shringara-manjari-katha was authored by Bhoja himself. According to her, the text aims to illustrate the various types of rāga (attachment) presented in the Shringara-Prakasha, another work attributed to Bhoja. The title of the text (and the name of its heroine) appears to have some connection with Bhoja's theory of Shringara rasa, which is also presented in the Shringara-Prakasha. Historian Daud Ali (2016) believes that the text was most likely composed by a courtier of Bhoja.

== Contents ==
Who are the persons who love her not? What are they? Who are not deceived? Who are not cheated? Who have not given their all to her? Where are all the brahmanas, kings, princes, merchants, kayasthas, and familymen who have not become her slaves?

— Description of Shringara-manjari, the king's favourite courtesan

She is proficient in arts, quick in reading the minds of others, conversant in the profession of courtesans, smart in cheating others, an expert in subduing the arrogant paramours, clever in deception, conversant in talks practised by harlots, bold in speaking purposeful words....

— Description of Vishama-shila, a procurer and the mother of Shringara-manjari

King Bhoja and his companions are sitting in his palace garden, in his capital Dhara. At the request of his courtiers, Bhoja starts telling a frame story set in Dhara. He first glorifies Dhara as a great city, and then turns to a mechanical doll (yantra-putraka), commanding it to speak. The doll begins to speak, and glorifies Bhoja.

Bhoja then resumes his story, describing his favourite courtesan (ganika) Shringara-manjari as a beautiful, educated, and talented woman. The king describes her mother Vishama-shila as an old, unattractive, and deceptive woman having the skills required to manage courtesans.

Then, the actual frame story begins: Vishama-shila is concerned that one day her daughter Shringara-manjari may be cheated by rogue men, and therefore, educates her about the character of different types of men, by telling her thirteen short stories.

=== The tale of Ravi-datta ===
Ravi-datta was born in a Brahmin family of Kundinapura, and mastered all the Vedas and the shastras by the age of 16 years. His father Soma-datta instructed him on several topics, including that of prostitutes. After the death of his parents, his friends convinced him to attend the festive procession of the god of love (Madana). Although this was against what his parents had taught him, Ravi-datta attended the event, and became infatuated with a courtesan named Vinaya-vati.

Vinaya-vati recognized him as an easy prey, and invited him home through her friend Sangamika. Ravi-datta was initially apprehensive, but ultimately agreed. He started visiting her everyday, and gradually, lost all his wealth to her. When Ravi-datta had no more money left, she sent a message to him through Sangamika, asking him to not visit her for a few days, as she would be with a wealthy merchant named Vasu-datta.

After some days, Ravi-datta visited Vinaya-vati's house, but her servants refused to let him in. He met Sangamika, but she refused to recognize him. He made repeated attempts to meet Vinaya-vati, but each time, her servants ridiculed him, and turned him away. Despite this, Ravi-datta's attachment for Vinaya-vati did not decrease. He kept thinking about her for the rest of his life, and considered himself lucky whenever he had an opportunity to look at her.

Vishama-shila explains that Ravi-datta's attachment like was like indigo. Just like a cloth dyed in indigo does not lose its colour even after being washed several times, a man with this character does not give up his attachment even after being ruined. She declares that the secret teachings of prostitution yielded good results once the nature of such men was known.

=== The tale of Vikrama-simha ===
One day, Prince Vikrama-simha of Tamalipti, was roaming around in the locality of courtesans. There, he saw Malatika, the daughter of the procurer Ekadamshtra. He was attracted to Malatika, and asked his servant Priyamvadaka to arrange a meeting with her. Malatika said that her livelihood depended on a merchant named Vasu-datta because of a contract, and Vikrama-simha will have to wait until she could find an excuse to meet him.

Vikrama-simha waited patiently for the entire rainy season. One day, Malatika sent her messenger Madhukarika to invite him to her place. He visited her, and once gratified, gave her much wealth before leaving. The next portion is lost, but the subsequent text suggests that Vikrama-simha felt offended for some reason. He stopped visiting Malatika, stopped sending her gifts, and his attachment for her gradually decreased.

Vishama-simha explains that Vikrama-simha's attachment was like rubia cordifolia root (mañjiṣṭhā). Just like a cloth dyed in it gradually fades in colour when washed, such a man gradually loses his attachment when offended. Therefore, a courtesan should not offend such men.

=== The tale of Madhava ===
A procurer named Bhujanga-vagura lived in the city of Vidisha. Her daughter Kuvalayavali was a beautiful young woman. One day, Madhava - a wealthy man and a student of the Vedas - returned to Vidisha from Simhala-dvipa. He learned of Kuvalayavali's beauty, and paid much money to spend a night with her. Kuvalayavali was pleased with him and started inviting him often. Gradually, she deprived him of all his wealth.

To avoid being seen as a ruined man, Madhava decided to leave Vidisha and go to Malaya country to earn wealth. Kuvalayavali cried and tried to stop him. Madhava refused to stay, but before leaving, gifted her his expensive upper garment. Kuvalayavali and her mother Bhujanga-vagura followed him for some distance, and then the mother asked him to give Kuvalayavali a token of remembrance. When Madhava said that he did not have anything left, she suggested that he give her the clothes remaining on his body. Madhava agreed, but said that he was feeling shy because there were many travelers on the road. He asked the women to follow him to a lonely spot where he could remove his clothes and give them to Kuvalayavali. When they reached a lonely spot, Madhava attacked Bhujanga-vagura: he threw her on the ground, and cut her nose and ears. He declared that this was a token of remembrance that she would never forget, and then left.

Vishama-shila explains that Madhava's attachment was like safflower (kusumbha). Just like a cloth dyed in safflower is not suitable for washing or exposing to heat, a man with this character becomes estranged and evil when offended. Therefore, a courtesan should take the wealth of such a man without offending him.

=== The tale of Sura-dharman ===
A poor man named Sura-dharman lived in the Hastigrama village of Brahmins, located on the banks of the Ganges river. He obtained a precious jewel by worshipping the deity of the sea. He was concerned about losing the jewel, so he cut open his thigh, and hid it there. To avoid being seen as the owner of a precious jewel, he started feigning madness, and wandered around, saying only the words "Mother knows".

After several days, Sura-dharman came to Ujjayini, the capital of king Vikramaditya. The king's courtesan Deva-datta was always looking for rich men to fleece. One day, she came across Sura-dharman and realized that he must be feigning madness to hide something precious. She brought him home, and made several attempts to find his secret, at the cost of neglecting the king. However, even after six months, Sura-dharman did not say anything except "Mother knows".

One day, Sura-dharman decided to leave, concerned that Deva-datta will be able to find his secret if he stayed any longer. Deva-datta threatened to immolate herself, but still failed to stop him from leaving. Deva-datta took this as a personal defeat, and decided to make a final attempt to stop him by faking her death.

Following Deva-datta's plan, two girls met on the road where Sura-dharman was walking. One girl informed the other that Deva-datta had fallen in love with a madman, and died after he left her. When Sura-dharman heard this, he told the girls that he was the person responsible for her death, and ran back to her house. At the house, Deva-datta played dead, surrounded by other people. The procurer cried and rebuked Sura-dharman for destroying their happiness. Feeling sorry, Sura-dharman gave the jewel to the procurer, and decided to commit suicide to be with Deva-datta. Just then, Deva-datta opened her eyes, and a rumour spread that she had miraculously risen from dead when her lover came to her. Sura-dharman lived happily with Deva-datta for some days, but then, she kicked him out.

Vishama-shila explains that Sura-dharman's attachment was like turmeric powder (haridrā). Just like a cloth dyed in turmeric fades in the heat of the sun, a man with this character becomes averse by threats. Therefore, a courtesan should resort to other, extraordinary means to take his wealth.

=== The tale of Deva-datta ===
One day, king Vikramaditya of Ujjayini asked his courtesan Deva-datta how courtesans acquire a man's wealth and how should a man deal with them. Deva-datta did not want to answer the question, and changed the topic of conversation by narrating a strange incident.

Deva-datta said that on the previous day, she saw a handsome man riding a wonderful horse on the palace grounds. The man invited her to mount the horse, and took her to a distant mansion on the flying horse. At the mansion, she saw a man with a whip and a beautiful, crying woman. Deva-datta was asked to act as a messenger of love between the two. When she declined, the man with the whip started beating her. Deva-datta started chanting that she served king Vikramaditya, the conqueror of the three worlds. The others felt the presence of the king, and fled in fear. Sometime later, Deva-datta found herself on the palace grounds.

The king repeatedly asked Deva-datta if this incident really happened, and she swore that it was true. Pleased with her, the king gifted her his second best elephant, 40 million pieces of gold, precious ornaments, and expensive clothes. Deva-datta smiled and said that she had just demonstrated how courtesans acquire a man's wealth. A pleased Vikramaditya doubled the gifts.

Vishama-shila told her daughter that one can acquire wealth by acting according to the others' desires, and that anything can be attained with flattery.

=== The tale of Lavanya-sundari ===
Vishama-shila remarks that for those who are willing to sacrifice themselves, it is not difficult to obtain a desire from great and valorous persons. She then narrates the following story.

A rich oilman named Ghuda and his beautiful wife Lavanya-sundari lived happily in the town of Ahichchhatra. One day, the local king Vajra-mukta saw Lavanya-sundari, and became infatuated with her. His spies told him that she was already married to Ghuda. So, he had Ghuda wrongfully arrested for adulteration of oil. Ghuda tried to secure his release by offering a large amount of money, but the king declared that he will be freed only if he is able to get a hundred elephants within six months.

Lavanya-sundari considered her husband's freedom more important than her own reputation, and decided to become a courtesan to secure the elephants from king Sahasanka of Ujjayini. She reached Ujjayini with a large retinue, took up a residence on the banks of the Shipra River, and spread the word that she was a rich and noble courtesan. When the king heard about her, he passed by her residence on the pretext of hunting. He was mesmerized by her beauty, and sent a man named Mukharaka to invite her to his palace.

Lavanya-sundari accepted the invitation, and started staying at the king's palace. The king's advisor Bhatta-matrgupta warned him not to trust a prostitute. However, Vikramaditya tested her many times, and she always proved loyal to him. Lavanya-sundari was afraid of Bhatta-matrgupta, but as the six-month deadline approached closer, she decided to take a step towards securing the elephants. She stormed into a room where the king and his advisor were sitting, and angrily rebuked the king for regarding her true love as prostitution. She then went to the bedroom, and beheaded herself using a dagger. The king was stunned, and angrily asked Bhatta-matrgupta if he considered this an act of a prostitute. Bhatta-matrgupta replied in affirmative, but the king disregarded him, and took the dead body to the temple of the goddess Ashapura. There, he announced that he would behead himself before the goddess. Pleased with his love and courage, the goddess revived Lavanya-sundari.

The king now fully trusted Lavanya-sundari. Some days later, he promised to fulfill any wish of hers. Initially, she declined to make a wish, but the king insisted. She then said that she had been fascinated with elephants since childhood, and wanted a hundred elephants. The king fulfilled her wish. After 2–3 days, she asked the king to free her, and narrated her story. The king allowed her to go back, and she spent the rest of her life happily with her husband Ghuda.

=== The tale of the cheating procurer ===
A Brahmin had two sons, named Vishnu-gupta and Soma-datta. When they grew up, they decided to visit another country. During the journey, they spent 7 days passing through the Vindhya forests, and ran out of food and water. They decided to rest and pass the night under a banyan tree beside a lake. They agreed to take turns to guard against wild animals at night.

During his turn, Soma-datta heard a pair of pigeons talking. The female pigeon suggested that they throw themselves in fire to provide food for the starving Brahmins. The male pigeon agreed, and spoke of a sage's prophecy: the person who ate the male pigeon would become a king, and the person who ate the female pigeon would get 500 pieces of gold every day. After the birds threw themselves into the fire, Soma-datta took them out, and woke up his brother. He told his brother about the prophecy: he ate the female pigeon, and gave the male pigeon to his brother.

In the morning, Soma-datta found 500 gold pieces by his side. Convinced that the prophecy was true, the brothers happily resumed their journey, and separated after some time. Vishnu-gupta, the elder brother, became the king of Magadha. Soma-datta came to the city of Kanchi, where a procurer named Makara-damshtra lived with her daughter Karpurika. Soma-datta spent time with Karpurika, and gave her large amounts of gold. Intrigued by his seemingly unlimited wealth, Makara-damshtra had her daughter find out his secret. She then fed Soma-datta an emetic to induce vomiting. When the female pigeon came out of his mouth, she ate it, and started getting 500 pieces of gold everyday. A regretful Soma-datta decided to leave.

While traveling, Soma-datta heard about the new king of Magadha, and deduced that the king must be his brother. He visited Magadha, obtained great wealth from his brother, and returned to Kanchi after a few days. When Karpurika asked him about his wealth, he replied that he had practiced penance at Shri-parvata to obtain a yogic power (siddhi) that allowed him to generate great wealth. A greedy Karpurika offered to exchange the pigeon for this power. Soma-datta agreed, and re-acquired his ability to get 500 pieces of gold. He returned to Magadha, while Karpurika was left disappointed.

Vishama-shila advises her daughter to never trouble rogue men, as they may take even previously earned wealth when irritated.

=== The tale of a woman's love ===
Vishama-shila says that the next story will demonstrate why a courtesan should never fall in love.

A rich man named Vasu-datta lived in the Pundra-vardhana town, with his only son Ratna-datta. Guided by his teacher Vasu-bhuti, Ratna-datta grew up to be a very knowledgeable man. He decided to work in the service of a powerful king instead of continuing his father's business. He declared that courtesans would invite him and not abandon him; if this did not happen, he would commit suicide. Accordingly, he set out to meet king Pratapa-mukuta of Manyakheta, accompanied by his servant Subandhu. He decided to earn his living on the way, but kept 1,000 pieces of gold in case of an emergency.

On their way to Manyakheta, Ratna-datta and Subandhu came to Vidisha, and attended a dance performance by the courtesan Lavanya-sundari at the temple of Bhailla-svami-deva-pura. The courtesan fell in love with Ratna-datta at first sight, and after the performance, sent her friend Bakulika to invite him home. Ratna-datta and Lavanya-sundari spent a night together, and she became so attached to him that she stopped thinking about all other men. However, he left in the morning and went to a gaming house. She sent Bakulika to invite him again, and that night, asked him about his future plans. When Ratna-datta said that he was going to Manyakheta, Lavanya-sundari decided to go with him, accompanied by a procurer.

Some days later, the travelers reached the town of Punyapathaka. The procurere wanted Lavanya-sundari to return to Vidisha, so she conspired to have Ratna-datta killed by portraying him as a kidnapper. The conspiracy proved to be unsuccessful, when the local king Sura-dharman realized that Lavanya-sundari was accompanying Ratna-datta willingly. The travelers continued their journey, and reached Manyakheta. Ratna-datta left their residence in search for a job, saying that he would return after four days. Meanwhile, the local king saw Lavanya-sundari, became enamoured by her, and invited her to his palace. Lavanya-sundari agreed on the condition that she would be allowed to leave whenever she wanted.

On the fourth day, Lavanya-sundari left the palace to welcome Ratna-datta back. The king was curious to see her lover, so, he came to their residence, and hid behind a latticed window. When Ratna-datta came, Lavanya-sundari prepared to wash his feet. Looking at her dress, Ratna-datta realized she had become the royal courtesan. He stopped her from washing his feet, and declared that she was like his mother now that she had become the king's partner. Pleased by Ratna-datta, the king invited him to the royal palace. Ratna-datta entered the royal service, started enjoying the king's favours, and forgot all about Lavanya-sundari.

Vishama-shila tells her daughter that women who become deeply attached to men destroy themselves and their wealth.

=== The tale of mutual love ===
King Samara-simha of Ugrapura had a courtesan named Ashoka-vati, who was an expert at sword-dancing. She was in love with the king's feudatory (samanta) Chaddalaka. On a winter day, the king asked her to perform a sword-dance in an assembly of his feudatories. Hoping that Chaddalaka would be present there, the courtesan put on her best dress, and promised to make an offering to the god if she saw Chaddalaka that day. On her way to the court, she saw the wish-fulfilling god Ganapati, and became very happy.

At the assembly, Ashoka-vati started her performance with great rhythm and grace. However, when she did not see Chaddalaka, her enthusiasm diminished, and she lost her grace. Worried that she would lose her balance and fall on the sword, her teacher requested the king to stop the performance. The king agreed, and rebuked Ashoka-vati. Ashoka-vati told the king the reason for her poor performance, and boldly declared her love for Chaddalaka, stating that she was ready to accept any punishment. The king did not punish her, but asked her not to be so bold again.

To the king's surprise, as soon as she left the court, she went straight to Chaddalaka's residence. He decided to cause a rift between the two lovers. On the king's instructions, a handsome young man named Sundaraka seduced her, and recorded evidence of their one-night stand using a pattanika. (The exact meaning of pattanika is not known: according to A.K. Warder, it was "probably a fine cloth on which a print could be taken from a woman's body, reproducing her characteristic make up and even blood from love scratches".)

Next day, Ashoka-vati regretted being unfaithful to Chaddalaka. Sundaraka felt dejected seeing that she was no longer interested in him, and gave the pattanika to the king. The king presented the evidence before Chaddalaka, but Chaddalaka dismissed it as a ploy to cause a rift between him and Ashoka-vati. Nevertheless, he decided to test Ashoka-vati's love for him. He asked his minister Tikkapaika to see her reaction on being informed that he had died in battle against the king of Kachchha. When Ashoka-vati heard the fake news, she died of shock. Sundaraka blamed himself for her death, and committed suicide by immolation. Chaddalaka also threw himself on a funeral pyre on the cremation ground.

The king felt sorry for having caused the deaths of three innocent people, and decided to behead himself before the goddess Ashapura. The goddess prevented him from doing so, and at his request, revived the three dead people. The king brought Ashoka-vati and Chaddalaka together, and made Sundaraka the lord of 4,000 villages.

Vishama-shila tells her daughter that many courtesans lose their wealth and their lives when they fall in love with men. Therefore, a courtesan should stay away from love like she stays away from a tiger.

=== The tale of the snake ===
A Brahmin named Shruta-dhara lived in the city of Kaushambi, and had a son named Vinaya-dhara. At the age of sixteen, the son completed his education, and attended a spring festival at the Kala-priya-deva temple. There, he saw a courtesan named Ananga-vati, started visiting her, and gradually lost all his wealth. Ananga-vati liked him, but the procurer did not approve of her fondness for a poor man. The procurer kicked Vinaya-dhara out of their place several times, but Vinaya-dhara and Ananga-vati continued to meet under various pretexts.

One day, Vinaya-dhara spotted a dead snake, and picked it up. He borrowed money from a friend, and gained admittance to Ananga-vati's place. At midnight, when everyone else was sleeping, he came to the room where the procurer's room. He threw the snake on the procurer's body, pinched her nose and lips to mimic a snakebite, and left quickly. The procurer woke up screaming, and her servants rushed to help her. Vinaya-dhara also came back with a stick, pretended to kill the snake, and said that something needed to be done about the stings on the procurer's body. The procurer asked her servants to cut off her nose and her lips to prevent the venom from spreading. In the morning, everyone congratulated Vinaya-dhara for saving the procurer's life, while she continued to squirm in pain.

Vishama-shila cautions her daughter that rogue men can do unpredictable things when harassed.

=== The tale of Malaya-sundari ===
Vishama-shila tells her daughter that no one should be insulted, because there is nothing that an insulted man would refrain from doing. She then narrates the following story.

Pratapa-simha, an ugly and passionate man, was a feudatory to the king Mahendra-pala of Kanyakubja. A procurer named Dhonda lived with her daughter Malaya-sundari in the same town. One day, Pratapa-sundara visited Malaya-sundari and spent the night with her. When he woke up next morning, he saw that a child was sleeping beside Malaya-sundari. The child was that of her sister, but when Pratapa-simha enquired, she teased him by saying that it was her own child.

Pratapa-simha lost his temper, and assaulted Malaya-sundari: he threw her on the ground, scratched her body like a tiger, and pulled her hair. Malaya-sundari was a favorite of king Mahendra-pala, and the procurer complained to the king. Pratapa-simha defended himself by saying that he had always tolerated her teasing, but became very angry when she said the child was hers. He said that the assault resulted from his extreme attachment to her. The king was pleased with explanation, and gave him presents, while Malaya-sundari became an object of ridicule.

Vishama-shila concludes that an insulted man would do anything to ridicule a woman.

=== The tale of Pamaraka ===
Vishama-shila says that one should not become the enemy of a crook (dhūrta) without a just cause. The actual story is lost, but at its end, Vishama-shila tells her daughter to never deceive a clever man, or be ready to bear the results.

=== The tale of Mula-deva ===
Vishama-shila explains that the attachment (rāga) may be born on hearing, seeing, or being with a partner. In all three cases, it should be abandoned, or it makes a woman an object of ridicule, even if she is from a good family.

A crook (dhūrta) named Mula-deva was very close to king Vikramaditya of Ujjayini. One day, the king asked him why he was still unmarried. Mula-deva replied that he did not marry because women are fickle in their love. The king said that women are the main source of happiness and the main support of a man's life, and convinced Mula-deva to get married.

After some time, Mula-deva discovered that his wife was having an affair with another man. He also found that Vikramaditya's chief queen Chella-mahadevi was having an affair with the royal elephant-driver, and visited him every night. In fact, one night the elephant-driver lashed her with a rope because she was late, but she was so attached to him that she pacified him by spending the night with him. The next day, Mula-deva proved to the king that their wives were unfaithful to them. The king punished both women, and imprisoned the queen after cutting off her nose and ears.

Vishama-shila tells her daughter that even courtesans of noble character and women from good families sometimes fall in love at first sight, without caring for their lives or wealth. Such attachment should be avoided.

== Scholarly interest and analysis ==
South Asian places mentioned in the Shringara-manjari-katha. The text also mentions Suvarna-dvipa (Sumatra) and Ratna-dvipa (an island near Java), besides several rivers.

Kalpalata Munshi describes Shringara-manjari-katha as a product of a decadent phase in Sanskrit literature, when the poets emphasized convention over creativity. Nevertheless, she praises the work for its "rich contents, references, interests, and its uniqueness of form." The text is useful as a source of information about the contemporary social life, customers, traditions, administration, architecture and geography.

Scholars have compared Shringara-manjari-katha to Damodara-gupta's Kuttanimata and Kshemendra's Samaya-matrika. All three works feature a procurer educating a courtesan on how to deal with men. However, Shringara-manjari-katha is written in prose and is more focused on story-telling. The other two are poems, and give more attention to kamashastra (the art of love-making).

Some of the motifs found in Shringara-manjari-katha also appear in other contemporary texts. For example, in the tale of Lavanya-sundari, the heroine gains the trust of king Vikramaditya, but the minister does not trust her. In the end, she asks the king for a favour to free her true lover, and the king obliges. A similar story appears in Somadeva's Kathasaritsagara (also from the 11th century): the courtesan Kumudika befriends king Vikramasimha, but the minister Ananga-tunga warns the king against her. When the king feigns his death to test her, she throws herself into his funeral pyre. Although the minister is still distrustful of her, the king now fully trusts her and asks her to make a wish. She then reveals that she is in love with someone else, and seeks the king's help in rescuing her imprisoned lover. Kshemendra's Kala-vilasa features the same story with minor changes.

The text has attracted scholarly attention for its mention of a garden with several mechanical devices, including a mechanical doll (yantra-putraka) located near a mechanical "fountain house" (yantra-dhārā-gṛha). While the doll is used as a literary device to praise Bhoja, what is notable is that the text also describes several other mechanical objects in the scene, including artificial trees, lotuses, ducks, monkeys, fish, herons, crocodiles, turtles, bees, and female attendants. These objects are said to have been built of expensive metals and gems. They are described as moving, making sounds, and spraying water. For example, the female attendants played lutes and drums, bathed, and sprayed water from their breasts and fingernails. Somadeva's Yashas-tilaka-champu, written in the previous century (959 CE), also describes such a mechanical garden with several moving objects, but the Shringara-manjari-katha is more detailed in its description and also adds sounds to the mechanical objects.
