= Susan Quilliam =

British writer

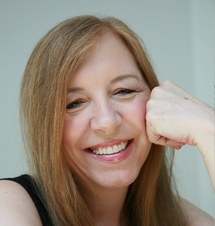
- Susan Quilliam
- Occupations: Writer, trainer, coach
- Website: http://www.susanquilliam.com

Susan Quilliam is a British relationship expert who specialises in love and sexuality. She works as an advice columnist, writer, broadcaster, consultant, trainer and coach. Quilliam is associated with several relationship organisations, including Relate and the Family Planning Association, and is the author of 22 books published in 33 countries and 24 languages. She revised The Joy of Sex (2008) for modern sensibilities.

== Early life, education and career ==
Born in Liverpool, Quilliam gained her Psychology degree (BA honors Social studies) at the University of Liverpool in 1971.

== Later public career ==
Quilliam has been the sex and relationship advice columnist for Fabulous magazine, a Sunday supplement of The Sun, as well as resident psychologist answering patient questions for the Sexual Advice Association website.

Quilliam came to attention in both the US and UK for her rewriting of the manual The Joy of Sex in 2008. Originally published in 1972, she reworked Alex Comfort's book for a better male/female balance.

She is a Member of the Council for Sexuality and Sexual Health of the Royal Society of Medicine.

Quilliam from 2008 to 2010, co-presented a weekly radio programme, Sex in the City with Jim Davis on LBC 97.3. She has run workshops on relationships and intimacy and is on the London faculty of The School of Life, and has spoken several times at the Royal Society of Medicine on the links between relationships and health.
