= Anthedon (mythology) =

In Greek mythology, there were several people named Anthedon (Ancient Greek: Ἀνθηδών means "rejoicing in flowers") — at least two male and one female.

- Anthedon, possible father of Glaucus, a sea god — whose mother might have been Alcyone.
- Anthedon, son of Dius and grandson of Anthas, thus great-grandson of Poseidon and Alcyone, eponym of the town Anthedon in Boeotia.
- Anthedon, the Naiad nymph of Anthedon, Boeotia.
