= Reader's Digest Guide to Love and Sex =

1998 sex manual

- Author: Amanda Roberts and Barbara Padgett-Yawn
- Language: English
- Subject: Human sexuality
- Publication date: 1998
- Publication place: United States
- Media type: Print

Reader's Digest Guide to Love and Sex is a 1998 sex manual edited by Amanda Roberts and Barbara Padgett-Yawn and published by Reader's Digest. The book contains graphs, charts, and diagrams.
