= Sandstone Retreat =

Southern California swingers resort (1969–1976)

Sandstone
- Intentional Community
- Nickname: Sandstone Ranch
- Location within Los Angeles County
- Coordinates: 34°4′3″N 118°37′20″W
- Country: United States
- State: California
- County: Los Angeles
- Establish: 1969
- Founder: John and Barbara Williamson

Area
  - Total: 15 acres (6.1 ha)
- Elevation: 1,702 ft (519 m)
- Time zone: UTC-8 (Pacific (PST))
  - Summer (DST): UTC-7 (PDT)

Sandstone Retreat, officially the Sandstone Foundation for Community Systems Research, was a clothing-optional, open sexuality resort for swingers located at Sandstone Ranch, a 15-acre (6.1 ha) estate in the Santa Monica Mountains overlooking Malibu and the Pacific Ocean.

== History ==
The community's beginnings are based on the philosophical ideals of John (July 31, 1932 – March 24, 2013) and Barbara Williamson. John was an engineer by training, and a former project manager with Lockheed Aircraft who worked on the design and management of missile support systems, including development of the Polaris missile. In the early 1960s, he opened his own electronics company, but later sold it to purchase the property at 21400 Saddle Peak Road, a cluster of well-maintained buildings on a 15-acre hilltop site in Topanga Canyon in 1968, and founded the Sandstone Foundation for Community Systems Research, Inc. in 1969. Barbara Williamson, née Cramer, was a former insurance sales representative who had met and married her husband in 1966. The Williamsons believed their venture was about exchanging partners for sex and setting society free, and that monogamy was sexually unsatisfactory and preventing people from having full lives.

The retreat offered members and guests over the age of 18 the resources of a spa with the addition of several large open communal sleeping areas, both indoor and outdoor, and communal bathrooms. Prospective members were interviewed on a daytime visit to determine suitability.

The retreat was managed by a residential community consisting of up to 20 persons, a self-selective job. At its height in the early 1970s, it welcomed such members as Daniel Ellsberg, Anthony Russo, Betty Dodson, Max Lerner, and Dr. Alex Comfort, as well as a variety of major and minor Hollywood celebrities, educators, attorneys as well as members of the public. The Williamsons sold the resort in 1973; reputedly never profitable, it finally closed in 1976.

The retreat was the subject of a documentary called Sandstone (1975), still in release through Indieflix.com. It is mentioned in the 1973 edition of More Joy of Sex, by Dr. Alex Comfort (it was omitted from later editions), and treated in the book Thy Neighbor's Wife (1980) by American author Gay Talese, who first set foot in Sandstone in 1971 as part of his preparations for writing, and lived at the retreat for several months.

The Sandstone Retreat buildings were destroyed in the Palisades Fire of 2025 (January 7–30, 2025).
