= The Good Vibrations Guide to Sex =

Book by Cathy Winks and Anne Semans

- Authors: Cathy Winks, Anne Semans
- Language: English
- Publication place: United States
- Media type: Print

The Good Vibrations Guide to Sex is a sex manual co-written by Cathy Winks and Anne Semans, and published by Cleis Press. The authors run the Good Vibrations sex shop chain. The book is billed as "the most complete sex manual ever written".

== Reception ==
Debby Herbenick writing in The Courier-Journal recommended this book for knowing about communication during sex and tips for exploring different aspects of sexuality. The San Antonio Express-News describe this book as "two of the best general sexuality references", the other being Pucker Up by Tristan Taormino.
