= The Joy of Gay Sex =

1977 book by Charles Silverstein

- Authors: Charles Silverstein; Edmund White
- Language: English
- Subject: Gay sexual practices
- Publisher: Crown
- Publication date: 1977
- Publication place: United States
- Media type: Print
- ISBN: 978-0-671-24079-0
- Followed by: The New Joy of Gay Sex

The Joy of Gay Sex is a sex manual for men who have sex with men by Charles Silverstein and Edmund White. The book was first published in 1977 and was inspired by the bestselling 1972 book The Joy of Sex. The original print run was for 75,000 copies. The book has been translated into French, German, Italian, Swedish, and Japanese.

The 207-page book serves as a how-to guide "with chapters on blowjobs, cruising and dirty talk, a gay Kama Sutra with suggested sex positions like 'the crab' and a cultural guide with non-sexual chapters on the realities of coming out, gay politics, racism and more." It is celebrated for its sex-positive tone. In his memoir, Silverstein wrote that they wanted the book to "have a wider focus than just sex, that it should also advise the reader about life in the gay community and the majority of passages in the finished book were of a nonsexual nature."

The book was partially dedicated to the writer and activist Chris Cox. Silverstein was White's therapist when the publisher offered him the job as co-writer. White says, "The need to pay my rent exceeded my need for therapy."

== Sequels ==
The book was followed by The New Joy of Gay Sex, published by Perennial in August 1993, co-authored by Felice Picano, and The Joy of Gay Sex, fully revised and expanded third edition, published by William Morrow in January 2006, co-authored by Picano.

== See also ==
- The Joy of Sex
