= Cārucaryā =

Cārucaryā, Carucarya, or Charucharya (Sanskrit चारुचर्या) is a collection of ethical verses by Kashmirian writer called Kshemendra of eleventh century. Technically referred to as 'didactic poets', the book has moral instructions that are practicable even today. Grammatically simple the book is like a guidebook of ethics suitable to be kept in one's pocket for daily references and for quoting in appropriate instances.
