= William Bory =

American poet and gay activist (1950–1993)

- Born: August 18, 1950
- Died: November 12, 1993 (aged 43)
- Occupations: Poet; activist
- Partner: Charles Silverstein

William Bory (August 18, 1950 – November 12, 1993) was an American poet and gay activist.

== Career ==
Bory is among the poets who emerged in the 1980s, and who dealt with the spreading of AIDS in the gay community. These poets had to face death and dying, loss, anger, absence. In 1996, The James White Review: A Gay Men's Literary Quarterly said of Bory that "No sentimentality but the raw stuff intercedes and there is a freshness and daring physicalness to this writing style. [...] [his] work holds up and should be investigated. He is a stylist like Gunn and his voice is quite original and interesting." Bory proof-edited books for his then partner, Charles Silverstein, like A family matter: a parent's guide to homosexuality and Man to man: gay couples in America. In 1992, on the new edition of "The Joy of Gay Sex" by Charles Silverstein and Felice Picano, there is the dedica "A special thanks to William Bory for his help." In 1993 Bory published Orpheus in his underwear with Cythoera Press. On the cover there is Narcissus, the "mythical figure most suitable for the modern gay imagination in the West." The photo is by Kelly Grider.

== Personal life ==
Bory was the long-term companion of Dr. Charles Silverstein, American writer, therapist and gay activist. In his memoir, "For the Ferryman", Silverstein remembers his twenty-year romantic relationship with Bory, who had several neuroses and addictions. According to Silverstein, Bory was "charming, difficult and maddeningly broken".

According to Felice Picano, Bory was "quicksilver, sharp-tongued, ultracritical (especially on literary matters) [...] [he] hated my writing. In fact, Bory pretty much hated everyone's writing."

Bory died on November 12, 1993, from causes related to HIV/AIDS.
