= Polycrates (sophist) =

Athenian sophist (late 5th-early 4th century BC)

Polycrates (Greek: Πολυκράτης c. 440-370 B.C.) was a sophist from Athens, who later retired to the island of Cyprus.

He wrote a work titled The Indictment of Socrates, thought to have been written during the 390s BC. He wrote works about the Greek mythical characters Clytaemnestra, wife of Agamemnon, king of Mycenae, and Busiris, a king of Egypt. He also wrote verses on cooking pots, mice, counters, pebbles and salt.

The poet Aeschrion of Samos claimed that Polycrates was the author of the sex manual traditionally attributed to Philaenis of Samos.
