= Ratirahasya =

Medieval Indian sex manual

- Author: Kokkoka
- Language: Sanskrit
- Subject: Human sexuality
- Genre: Sex manual
- Publication date: 11th or 12th century
- Publication place: Kashmir
- English publication date: 1964
- Media type: Printed
- Pages: 172

The Ratirahasya (Sanskrit रतिरहस्य) (translated in English as Secrets of Love, also known as the Koka Shastra) is an early medieval Kashmiri sex manual written by Kokkoka, a poet, who is variously described as Koka or Koka Pandit. The exact date of its writing is not known, but it is estimated the text was written in the 11th or 12th century. It is speculated that Ratirahasya was written to please a king by the name Venudutta. Kokkoka describes himself in the book as siddha patiya pandita, i.e. "an ingenious man among learned men". The manual was written in Sanskrit.

== Historical context ==
Unlike the Kama Sutra, which is an ancient sex manual related to Hindu literature, Ratirahasya deals with medieval Indian society. A sex manual was needed that would be suitable for the medieval cultural climate, and Ratirahasya was written, quite different from the ancient text Kama Sutra.

== Structure ==
There are fifteen pachivedes (chapters) and 800 verses in Ratirahasya which deal with various topics such as different physiques, lunar calendar, different types of genitals, characteristics of women of various ages, hugs, kisses, sexual intercourse and sex positions, sex with a strange woman, etc. Kokkoka describes various stages of love in Ratirahasya, the fifth stage being weight loss, the ninth is fainting, and the tenth and last stage is death. Ratirahasya makes classifications of women, and describes erogenous zones and days that lead to women's easy arousal.

Ratirahasya is describes in detail Indian feminine beauty, similar to that found in Kamasutra. The book classified women into four psycho-physical types, according to their appearance and physical features.

1. Padmini (lotus woman)
2. Chitrini (art woman)
3. Shankini (conch woman)
4. Hastini (elephant woman)

On the basis of the size of the genitals, the text classifies sexual intercourse into nine different types. Aphrodisiacs are also described in the book.

== Analysis ==
According to W.G. Archer, Kokkoka "is concerned with how to make the most of sex, how to enjoy it and how to keep a woman happy." In writing this text, Kokkoka depended on a number of other authors including, among others Nandikeshvara, Gonikaputra, and Vatsyayana.

== Translations ==
Arabic, Persian and Turkish translations of the book are entitled Lazzat Un Nisa. Alex Comfort, author of The Joy of Sex, made an English translation of Ratirahasya in 1964 titled The Koka Shastra, Being the Ratirahasya of Kokkoka, and Other Medieval Indian Writings on Love (London: George Allen and Unwin). Another English translation was made by S. C. Upadhyaya, entitled Kokashastra (Rati Rahasya) of Pundit Kokkoka. Some commentaries have been written on this text by Avana Rama Chandra, Kavi Prabhu, and Harihara. It is a popular text in India, second only to the Kama Sutra among sex manuals.
