= Elephantis =

Greek poet and physician

Elephantis (Ancient Greek: Ἐλεφαντίς) (fl. late 1st century BC) was a Greek poet and physician renowned in the classical world as the author of a notorious sex manual. Due to the popularity of courtesans taking animal names in classical times, it is likely Elephantis is two or more persons of the same name. None of her works have survived, though they are referenced in other ancient texts.

== Works ==
According to Suetonius in The Twelve Caesars, the Roman Emperor Tiberius took a complete set of her works with him when he retreated to his resort on Capri.

One of the poems in the Priapeia refers to her books:

Obscenas rigido deo tabellas
dicans ex Elephantidos libellis
dat donum Lalage rogatque, temptes,
si pictas opus edat ad figuras.

("Lalage dedicates a votive offering to the God of the erect penis, bringing shameless pictures from the books of Elephantis, and begs him to try and imitate with her the variety of intercourse of the figures in the illustrations.")

And an epigram by the Roman poet Martial, which Smithers and Burton included in their collection of poems concerning Priapus, reads:

Quales nec Didymi sciunt puellae,
Nec molles Elephantidos libelli,
Sunt illic Veneris novae figurae

("Such verses as neither the daughters of Didymus know, nor the debauched books of Elephantis, in which are set out new forms of lovemaking.") "Novae figurae" has been read as "novem figurae" (i.e., "nine forms" of lovemaking, rather than "new forms" of lovemaking), and so some commentators have inferred that she listed nine different sexual positions.

Pliny the Elder references her performance as a midwife, and Galen notes her ability to cure baldness.

She also wrote a manual about cosmetics and another about abortives.
