= Dius (historian) =

Ancient historian of Phoenicia cited by Josephus

Dius (in Greek: Δῖος) was an ancient historian of Phoenicia.

== Life ==
Only one surviving fragment of his work appears in Josephus' Against Apion, where Josephus describes him as an accurate writer of Phoenician history and cites a section he wrote regarding the kings Solomon and Hiram I relations:

Now, that this may not depend on my bare word, I will produce for a witness Dius, one that is believed to have written the Phoenician History after an accurate manner. This Dius, therefore, writes thus, in his Histories of the Phoenicians: "Upon the death of Abibalus, his son Hirom took the kingdom. This king raised banks at the eastern parts of the city, and enlarged it; he also joined the temple of Jupiter Olympius, which stood before in an island by itself, to the city, by raising a causeway between them, and adorned that temple with donations of gold. He moreover went up to Libanus, and had timber cut down for the building of temples. They say further, that Solomon, when he was king of Jerusalem, sent problems to Hirom to be solved, and desired he would send others back for him to solve, and that he who could not solve the problems proposed to him should pay money to him that solved them. And when Hirom had agreed to the proposals, but was not able to solve the problems, he was obliged to pay a great deal of money, as a penalty for the same. As also they relate, that one·Abdemon, a man of Tyre, did solve the problems, and propose others which Solomon could not solve, upon which he was obliged to repay a great deal of money to Hirom." These things are attested to by Dius, and confirm what we have said upon the same subjects before.

— Josephus (with a quote of Dius), Against Apion, 1.17 (Translated by William Whiston)
