= Ananga Ranga =

15th or 16th century Indian sex manual

- Author: Kalyana malla
- Language: Sanskrit
- Publication date: 15th or 16th century
- Publication place: India

The Ananga Ranga (Hindi: अनंगरंग, lit. 'Stage of Love or Stage of the Bodiless One') or Kamaledhiplava (Hindi: कमलेधिप्लव, lit. 'Boat in the Sea of Love') is an ancient Indian Sanskrit text written by Kalyana malla in the 15th or 16th century. The translators of the manuscript stated that its objective is not to encourage wantonness, but simply to prevent the separation of husband and wife.

The poet wrote the work for the amusement of Lad Khan, son of Ahmed Khan Lodi. He was related to the Lodi dynasty, which from 1451 to 1526 ruled from Delhi. This work is often compared to the Kama Sutra, on which it draws. According to mythologist Devdutt Pattanaik, Kamasutra is a book written for the satisfaction of men while Ananga-ranga is written for the satisfaction of women.

== Overview ==
Ananga Ranga was translated and published in English by the Kama Shastra Society in 1885 under the editorship of Sir Richard Francis Burton. After his death, the manuscript of the translation and notes were burnt by his wife Isabel Burton. However, the historical fiction titled Kalyanamalla Charitam (Saga of Kalyanamalla) authored by Vallabharayar, said to incorporate the Ananga Ranga in its entirety including that were previously lost.
