= Aeschrion of Syracuse =

1st-century BC Syracusian

Aeschrion (Gr. Αἰσχρίων) of Syracuse, Magna Graecia, whose wife Pippa was one of the mistresses of Verres, was frequently mentioned by Cicero in the Verrine Orations. He assisted Verres in robbing the Syracusans, and obtained the farming of the tithes of the Herbitenses for the purpose of plundering them.
