= Anthana =

Anthana (Ancient Greek: Ἀνθάνα) was a town of ancient Arcadia mentioned by Stephanus of Byzantium.

Its site is unlocated.
