= Scione =

Ancient Greek city in Pallene

Coordinates: 39°56′21″N 23°34′29″E

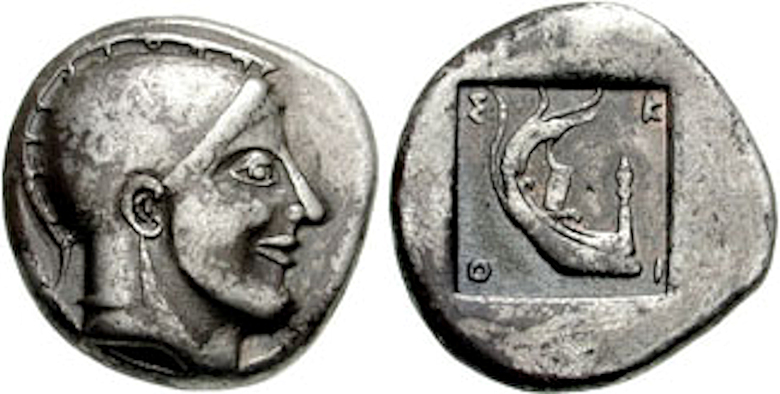
Coinage of Skione. Head of Protesilaos, wearing Attic helmet / Stern of galley left within incuse square. Circa 480–470 BC

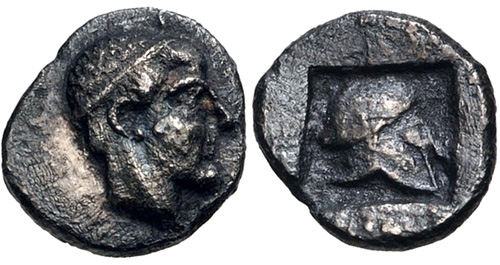
Coinage of Skione. Male head right, wearing tainia / Helmet right within incuse square. Circa 470–454 BC

Scione or Skione (Ancient Greek: Σκιώνη) was an ancient Greek city in Pallene, the westernmost headland of Chalcidice, on the southern coast east of the modern town of Nea Skioni.

Scione was founded c. 700 BCE by settlers from Achaea; the Scionaeans claimed their ancestors settled the place when their ships were blown there by the storm that caught the Achaeans on their way back from Troy. It "was situated on one summit of a two-crested hill and on the slopes toward the sea... The hill with the fortifications and the pottery fragments constituted the acropolis of ancient Scione and the hill beyond was that on which the defenders encamped 'before the city.'"

It was a member of the Delian League.

Its moment of historical importance came during the Peloponnesian War, when just after the truce between Sparta and Athens in early 423 BCE, Scione revolted against Athens and was encouraged by the Spartan general Brasidas with promises of support. The Athenians sent a fleet to retake Mende and Scione; after securing the former, they besieged Scione. In the summer of 421 they finally succeeding in reducing it; they put the adult males to death, enslaved the women and children, and gave the land to Plataea, an ally of Athens. Tim Rood writes that "Thucydides lets us feel Skione's thirst for freedom," and says the result of his account "is not criticism of Skione's folly, but pathos." W. Robert Connor says that "the ultimate destruction of Scione was one of the most notorious events in the war, and almost any Greek reader would know of its fate."

By the time of the Roman Empire, Scione had "almost vanished out of existence.". However, according to recent surveys, Scione survived in the Roman (imperial) period as a vicus of the Roman colony of Cassandreia. Scione is mentioned by Roman-era geographers Pomponius Mela, Strabo, and Pliny the Elder.

The site of Scione is 2 miles (3.2 km) southeast of the modern Nea Skione.

== See also ==
- Aethilla
- Hydna of Scione
