= Thy Neighbor's Wife (book) =

Nonfiction book by Gay Talese

- Cover of the first edition
- Author: Gay Talese
- Language: English
- Genre: Non-fiction; New Journalism
- Publisher: Doubleday
- Publication date: 1981
- Publication place: United States
- Media type: Print (hardcover and paperback)
- Pages: 568
- ISBN: 978-0-06-166543-1

Thy Neighbor's Wife is a non-fiction book by Gay Talese, published in 1981 and updated in 2009.

The book is an exploration of sexuality in America from after World War II through the 1970s, with discussion of the free love subculture. It provides a snapshot of liberated pre-AIDS sexual morality.

In preparation for writing the book, Talese resided for several months at Sandstone Retreat, a clothing-optional, open sexuality resort for swingers, in California.

In 1979, prior to the book's publication, United Artists purchased the film rights to Thy Neighbor's Wife for $2.5 million, which at the time was the largest amount ever paid for film rights to any book. At the time, UA contemplated making as many as three films based on the book, and in 1980, William Friedkin agreed to write and direct the first film, which he contemplated would receive an X rating.
