= Nicanor of Cyrene =

Nicanor (/naɪˈkeɪnər/; Greek: Nικάνωρ Nīkā́nōr) of Cyrene was an ancient scholar who lived in the Hellenistic period. No works of his survive, but he is mentioned as the author of a work called Changes of names (μετονομασίας).

In the mention of him by Stephanus of Byzantium, older texts of Stephanus appear to give Nicanor the surname "Leandrios"; more recent editions correct the text to saying that Nicanor is quoting from another author named "Maiandrios".

Nicanor is quoted as having discussed the variation between the names Sardeis and Hydē (Stephanus); Melikertēs and Glaukos (Athenaeus); and the founding of the city of Thebes in Egypt (scholia on Apollonius of Rhodes).
