= Lazzat Un Nisa =

Erotic Indian story in Urdu and Persian

Lazzat Un Nisa لذة النّساء
- Author: Mohammed Shah Jami; Hakim Nizamuddin
- Language: Urdu and Persian
- Subject: Eroticism
- Genre: Erotica
- Publication date: 1646
- Publication place: India
- Pages: 26

Lazzat Un Nisa (from Arabic: لذّة النّساء The Pleasure of Women) is an erotic Indian book, in the Urdu and Persian language. It depicts the art of sex through the role of jewellery and perfume in lovemaking, erotic writing as literature, and pornography as aphrodisiac. The book, translated or inspired by the Sanskrit book Koka Shastra, exists in several manuscripts. One was hand-illustrated and hand-copied in Urdu and Persian in 1850 by writer Mohammed Abdul Latif Muzdar Mehdune.

== History ==
Published during the reign of Sultan Abdullah Qutub Shah, the original manuscript was completed in 1646 AD, with 26 pages in the form of a book with 10 chapters, written by Mohammed Shah Jami, under the supervision of Royal physician Hakim Nizamuddin. The Lazzat Un Nisa is originally a translation of 11th Century Sanskrit book Koka Shastra, though the translation work was not named, some intellectuals started referring to it as Lazzat Un Nisa. It is thought that Żiyā’ al-Dīn Naḫšabī might be the translator.

In the fifteenth century, the Hindu court of Bidar patronized such erotic works as the Thadkirat al-Shahawat (List of aphrodisiacs) and Sringara Manjari (erotic Bouquets). Lizzat Un Nisa is one of the few surviving erotics works from the period. There is another Kitab ul-Laddhat un-nisa which was written for a certain vizir Kukapondat by the same content and translated from Parsi into Russian. Actually the book itself has no pornographic or explicit sexual bias. It gives instructions how to classify women from their outer aspect starting from their apparel and ending with some parts of their body. In the Middle Ages Central Asia was the most important urbanized complex of cities and the area thrived of scientific research especially in the medical and therapeutic sciences (Avicenna and Rhazes were born there) and therefore it is very interesting to read which, maybe for a man living in these frantic cities, unexpected defaults could show up in the sexual life when making acquaintance with ladies and how he/she could recur to be treated by a doctor and by which special medical recipes. Lately this book became available in Italian with historical comments as per attached bibliography.

A copy of the original manuscript was last seen in the state museum in Public Gardens in Hyderabad.

Several manuscripts of the Laḏḏat al-nisā’ exist. A version has been purchased by the Wellcome Library of London and resurfaced in 1824.

== Story ==
The main subject of the story is a man named Harichand, who under orders of a king, embarks on a journey to collect exotic gifts and beautiful women for the pleasures of the king. The manuscript provides advice on various sexual techniques. It has a section on how to arouse a woman and observations based on sizes of a woman's vagina and also a brief list of lengths of the phallus.

The book has couplets on the nature of men and the qualities of men and women. It has as many as 30 couplets describing Padmini, the woman with the most excellent qualities among the four types of women described.

It has chapters on other three women types — Chetani, Sankhini and Hastini. Then there are separate couplets on different methods one should adopt with each of the four women types. It also deals with the nerves that have sexual stimulation, besides precautions to be observed during pregnancy.
