= Alex Comfort =

British academic and physician (1920–2000)

- Born: Alexander Comfort; 10 February 1920; London, England
- Died: 26 March 2000 (aged 80); Oxfordshire, England, UK
- Education: University of Cambridge; University of London
- Occupations: Author; British physician; Gerontologist; Psychiatry professor
- Known for: Research and study of human sexual behaviour
- Notable work: The Joy of Sex (1972); More Joy of Sex (1974); The New Joy of Sex (1991)
- Spouses: Ruth Harris; Jane Henderson

Alexander Comfort (10 February 1920 – 26 March 2000) was a British scientist and physician, writer and activist, known best for his nonfiction sex manual, The Joy of Sex (1972). He was a poet and author of both fiction and nonfiction, as well as a gerontologist, geriatrician, sexologist, political theorist and commentator, anarchist, and pacifist.

== Early life and education ==
Comfort was born in Palmers Green, North London, and raised in Barnet, Hertfordshire, then a London suburb. His parents were Alexander Charles Comfort, an administrator in education at the London County Council, and Daisy Elizabeth (Fenner) Comfort, a former teacher, who taught her son French and some Latin by the time he began school. He was educated at Highgate School in London. While he was a student there he tried to develop an improved compound of gunpowder. During his experiments he inadvertently blew up his left hand, of which only the thumb remained. Later he claimed that his left hand proved "very useful for performing uterine inversions".

Comfort had a passion for molluscs, developed on family holidays in Hartland, on the Devon coast, and he joined the Conchological Society of Great Britain & Ireland when he was eighteen years old. He made many contributions to the literature.

He matriculated at Trinity College, Cambridge and studied medicine, qualifying in 1944 with the conjoint diplomas of Licentiate of the Royal College of Physicians (LRCP) London, Member of the Royal College of Surgeons (MRCS) England, and Bachelor of Medicine and Bachelor of Surgery or MB BChir.

== Life and work ==
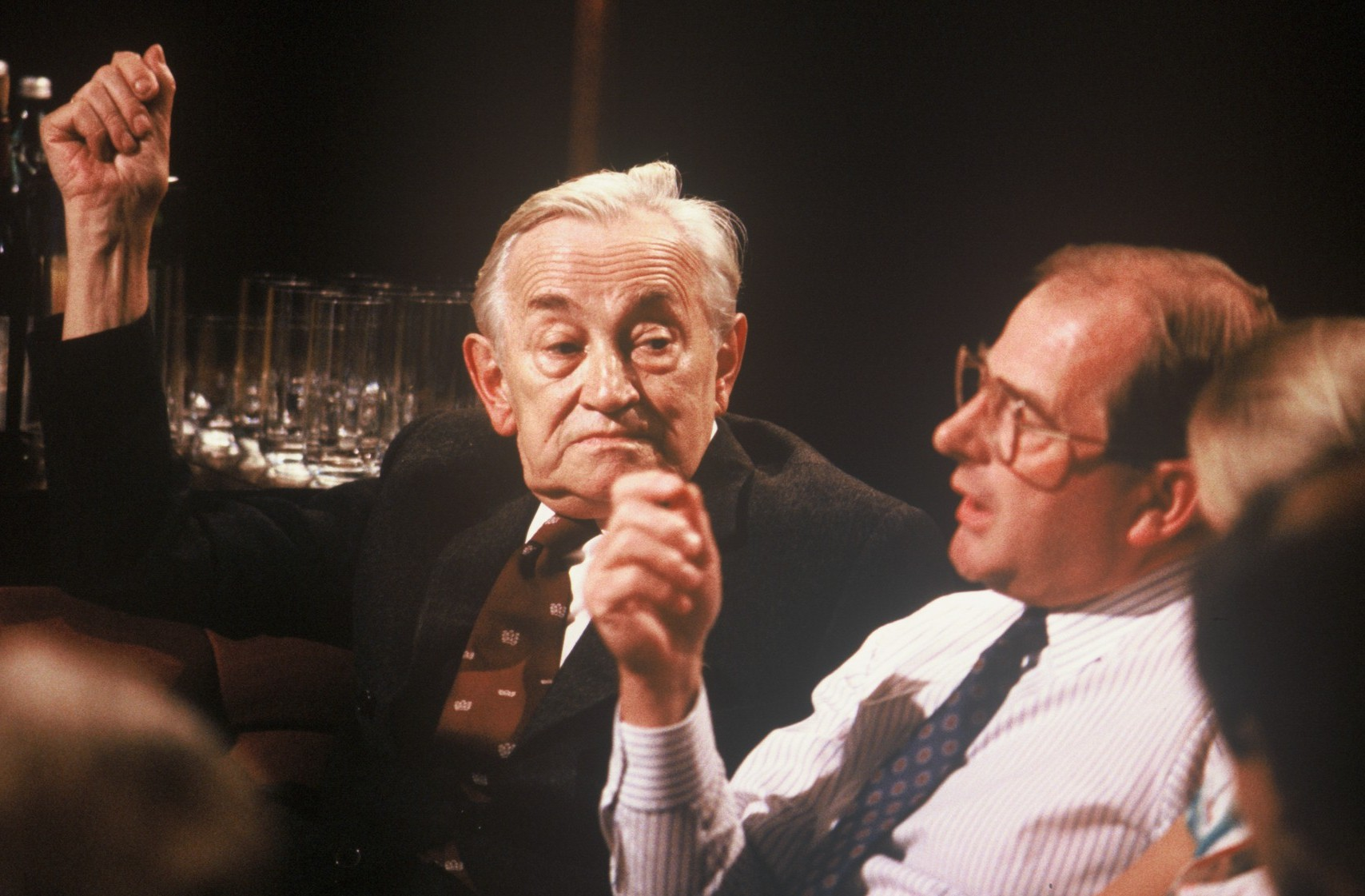
Appearing (centre) on After Dark in 1989

Comfort served as a house physician at the London Hospital and later became a lecturer in physiology at the London Hospital Medical College. During 1945 he obtained the Conjoint Board's Diploma in Child Health. He progressed to a PhD in 1949 for a dissertation titled "The Acid-Soluble Pigments of Molluscan Shells (with Special Reference to Porphyrins)" from the University of London, and a DSc in the field of gerontology, also from the University of London, in 1962.

A pacifist, Comfort considered himself "an aggressive anti-militarist", and he believed that pacifism rested "solely upon the historical theory of anarchism". During World War Two, Comfort wrote a letter to the Tribune (2 April 1943) denouncing the Allied bombing of civilians:

The bombardment of Europe is not the work of soldiers nor of responsible statesmen. It is the work of bloodthirsty fools. ... Night after night those Europeans who risk their liberty to listen can hear the emetic threatenings and boastings of bloody-minded and reactionary civilians. They contrast the alacrity and satisfaction which attend each contemptible operation with the subterfuge and sloth which we have displayed in such tasks of constructive policy as the admission to sanctuary of the Jewish refugees.

In a letter to Horizon in 1942 Comfort claimed that a Nazi victory over the United Kingdom would lead to a literary renaissance, for which he was fiercely criticised by George Orwell in the Partisan Review. Comfort was an active member of the Peace Pledge Union (PPU) and Campaign for Nuclear Disarmament, and a conscientious objector in World War II. In 1951 Comfort was a signatory of the Authors' World Peace Appeal, but later resigned from its committee, claiming the AWPA had become dominated by Soviet sympathisers. Later in the decade he actively endorsed both the Direct Action Committee against Nuclear War, 1957, and the Committee of 100, 1960. Comfort was imprisoned for a month, with Bertrand Russell and other leading members of the Committee of 100, for refusing to be bound not to continue organising the Parliament Square/Trafalgar Square protest of 17 September 1961. In 1964 he joined Russell's Who Killed Kennedy? Committee.

Among the publications by Comfort concerning anarchism are Peace and Disobedience (1946), one of many pamphlets he wrote for Peace News and PPU, and Authority and Delinquency in the Modern State (1950). He exchanged public correspondence with George Orwell defending pacifism in the open letter/poem, "Letter to an American Visitor," under the pseudonym Obadiah Hornbrooke.

Comfort's book The Joy of Sex (1972) earned him worldwide fame and $3 million. But he was unhappy about becoming known as "Dr. Sex" and having his other works given little attention.

Comfort devoted much of the 1950s and 1960s to studying the biology of ageing (biogerontology) and popularised the subject. During 1969 he suggested that life expectancy (not simply maximum life span) could be extended to 120 years of age within the next 20 years. Although Comfort believed that ageing could be postponed, he did not believe that it could be eliminated, and he did not write about rejuvenation.

In 1989, Comfort made an extended appearance on the television discussion programme After Dark, alongside, among others, Ian McColl and David Widgery.

One of Comfort's final letters was to The Guardian in 1989, protesting against the Thatcher government's introduction of the poll tax.

== Personal life ==
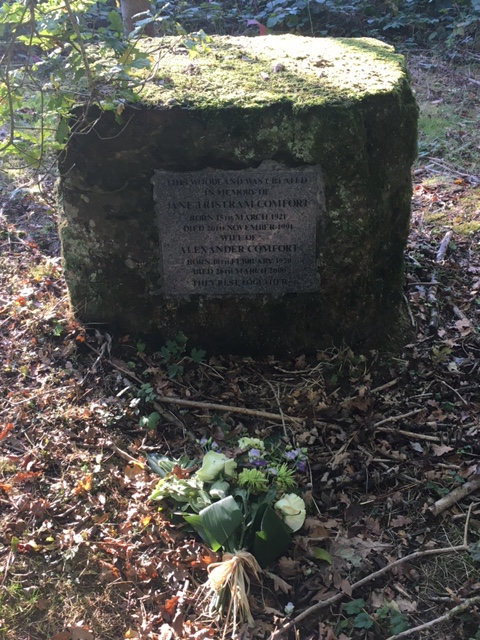
Memorial stone for Comfort and his wife Jane

The Joy of Sex made Comfort known internationally as "Dr. Sex" and soon thereafter he and his wife of thirty years divorced. A few months later, during 1973, Comfort married his mistress (and ex-wife's best friend) Jane Henderson, with whom he had been having an affair for more than a decade. The Center for the Study of Democratic Institutions, a liberal research institute, offered Comfort a job, and so, during 1973, the couple relocated to Santa Barbara, California.

They frequented the Sandstone Retreat, a clothing-optional community in California espousing open sexuality. In his 1981 nonfiction publication concerning sexuality in America, Thy Neighbor's Wife, Gay Talese noted: "Often the nude biologist Dr. Alex Comfort, brandishing a cigar, traipsed through the room between the prone bodies with the professional air of a lepidopterist strolling through the fields waving a butterfly net".

Jane Henderson, however, eventually became tired of the "open love" community and Comfort became involved in lawsuits with his employer concerning a claimed breach of contract. In 1985, the couple returned to England, where they lived the remainder of their lives in Kent.

During 1991, Comfort suffered a severe cerebral hemorrhage, after which his son from his first marriage acted as his caretaker and business manager. His second wife Jane Henderson died soon after the haemorrhage. He died on 26 March 2000; he was eighty years old.

== Collections ==
In 1973 Comfort deposited his archive to University College London (UCL); it was supplemented by a second donation in 1992 by his son Nicholas. The Comfort Papers span more than 80 boxes of material and primarily focus on Comfort's career and research. Comfort also donated his letters from Margaret Marron and Os Marron (along with some poems from the latter) to UCL in 1967.

== Partial bibliography ==
- No Such Liberty (1941) – novel. ASIN B007Q9DO6K
- Three New Poets (1942) – Alex Comfort, Roy McFadden, Ian Serraillier
- A Wreath for the Living (1942). ASIN B0007J03N8
- Elegies (1944)
- The Power House (1944) – novel
- The Song of Lazarus (1945). ASIN B0007DW3N2
- Outlaw of the Lowest Planet by Kenneth Patchen (1946) – Preface by Alex Comfort ASIN B0007IVLIU
- Art and Social Responsibility (1946). ASIN B0007ITVGO
- The Signal to Engage (1946). ASIN B00190YVC8
- Peace and Disobedience (1946) – pamphlet (reprinted in 1994 in Against Power and Death). OCLC 609741757
- Barbarism and Sexual Freedom (1948) – non-fiction ISBN 978-0838321478
- On This Side Nothing (1949) – novel, influenced by Albert Camus, whose work Comfort admired ASIN B0006ARRLY
- Authority and Delinquency in the Modern State (1950). ASIN B0D3W7RD4H
- Sexual Behaviour in Society (1950) – non-fiction
- Hygromia cinctella (Draparnaud) in England. (1950) Journal of Conchology. 23: 99–100.
- Biochemistry of molluscan shell pigments. Proc malac Soc London. 28: 79–85.
- And All But He Departed (1951). ASIN B000V8RYF0
- A Giant's Strength (1952) – novel. ASIN B0000CIBL1
- The Biology of Senescence (1956) – non-fiction
- Come Out to Play (1961) – novel
- Haste to the Wedding (1962)
- Darwin and the Naked Lady (1962) – articles. ASIN B0007DTUOC
- Sex in Society (1963) – non-fiction. ASIN B0019Y3HLU
- Ageing – the Biology of Senescence (1964)
- Koka Shastra, being the Ratirahasya of Kokkota, and other medieval Indian writings on love (George Allen & Unwin, 1964; translator). ISBN 978-1857324402
- Process of Ageing (1965). ASIN B000S9THCK
- The Nature of Human Nature – non-fiction (US edition Harper & Row 1966). ASIN B0006BQL6A
- The anxiety makers: some curious preoccupations of the medical profession. Nelson (1967). ASIN B0000CNHG1
- The Joy of Sex: a Gourmet Guide to Lovemaking (1972)
- More Joy of Sex: a Lovemaking Companion to The Joy of Sex (1973). ISBN 978-0517566909
- Come out to Play (1975)
- A Good Age (1976)
- Poems for Jane (1979). ISBN 978-0855331566
- The Facts of Love: Living, Loving and Growing Up Crown Publishers (1980). ISBN 978-0517538395
- I and That: Notes on the Biology of Religion (1980)
- Tetrarch (1981)-a fantasy novel inspired by William Blake
- Reality And Empathy: Physics, Mind, and Science in the 21st Century (1984). ISBN 978-0873957632
- Imperial Patient (1987) – a historical novel about Nero. ISBN 978-0715621684
- The Philosophers (1989) – satire of Thatcher's Government set in the future.
- The New Joy of Sex: a Gourmet Guide to Lovemaking for the Nineties (1992). ISBN 978-0517599105
- Writings Against Power and Death (1994). ISBN 978-0900384714

== See also ==
- Anarchism in the United Kingdom
- List of peace activists

== Bibliography ==
- Laursen, Eric (2023). Polymath: The Life and Professions of Dr. Alex Comfort, Author of The Joy of Sex. Chico/Edinburgh: AK Press. ISBN 978-1-84935-496-7.
