= Samaya Mātrikā =

11th-century work of Indian satire

The Samaya Mātrikā (en: The Courtesan's Keeper) is a satire written by the 11th-century Kashmiri poet Kshemendra. Originally written in Sanskrit, the work has since been translated into English by A. N. D. Haksar.

== Description ==
=== History ===
Samaya Matrika, or The Courtesan's Keeper, was written by the Kashmiri poet Kshemendra. The poet was born in Kashmir in the 11th century, and much of his body of work was set in the Kashmir region. He studied both Vaishnavism and Buddhism, and was versed in several vedic texts. After years of recording, abridging, and translating various texts, the poet began to produce his own works, one of which would become Samaya Matrika. The work was produced post 1037, the year in which the author began to transition to writing original content.

While many of his works were poems, historical epics, and abridgments of Hindu texts, Samaya Matrika was written to be a work of satire. The work pokes fun at the upper class (nobles and merchants), the clergy, the poor, the seasonal harvest, and the government. In doing so, the document has been cited as providing historians an insight into the day-to-day lives of people in the Medieval-era Kashmir valley. The story takes place in an urban setting, and there are notably a few mentions of far-away Chinese and Turkish peoples.

=== Plot ===
The work of satire follows the exploits of Kankali, a worldly Kashmiri courtesan who is given ward-ship over a younger woman, Kalavati. The two travel throughout Kashmir, with Kankali using her shapeshifting abilities to instruct her younger ward in the ways of the world; these lessons and observations in turn show Kalavati the general silliness of people. Kankali is also keen to point out the contradictions seen in people's behavior, such as priests re-selling temple offerings and monks breaking their vows. Alternatively, Kankali shows her ward the unsung nobility of others, such as a porter who carries water to nearby fields for farming and a noble magistrate who shirks personal wealth to deal fairly with the people.
