= The Joy of Sex =

1972 book by Alex Comfort

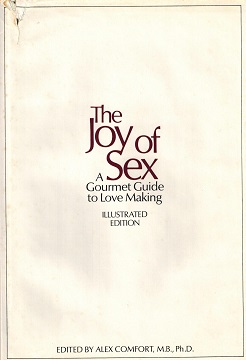
- Cover of the first edition
- Author: Alex Comfort
- Language: English
- Subject: Human sexuality
- Publisher: Crown
- Publication date: 1972
- Media type: Print

The Joy of Sex is a 1972 illustrated sex manual by British author Alex Comfort. An updated edition was released in September 2008.

== Overview ==
The Joy of Sex was at the top of The New York Times Best Seller list for 11 weeks and for more than 70 weeks in the top five (1972–1974).

The original intention was to use the same approach as such cook books as The Joy of Cooking, hence section titles include "starters" and "main courses". The book features sexual practices such as oral sex and various sex positions as well as bringing "further out" practices such as sexual bondage and swinging to the attention of the general public.

The original version was illustrated with specially commissioned illustrations by Chris Foss (black-and-white line drawings) and Charles Raymond (colour paintings) mixed with classical Indian and Japanese erotica to emphasize historical precedents for erotic illustration, out of concern of possible obscenity suits. The two artists based their work on photographs taken by Chris Foss, of Charles Raymond and his wife. The illustrations have become somewhat dated, mainly because of changes in hairstyles. Both the illustrations and text are titillating as well as illustrative, in contrast to the bland, clinical style of earlier books about sex. More recent editions feature new artwork, and added text emphasizing safer sex.

=== Pocket book ===
A pocket version entitled, The Joy of Sex, the Pocket Edition was also published. The book won the Bookseller/Diagram Prize for Oddest Title of the Year in 1997.

== Film ==
In 1984, Joy of Sex based on this book was released, directed by Martha Coolidge and written by Kathleen Rowell & J.J. Salter.

In July 2026, a new film based on the book was reported to be filming in the UK, directed by Sharon Maguire and written by Maguire and Lise Mayer.

== Video game ==
In 1993, a video game adaptation of the book was released for the Philips CD-i. It is the earliest known video game to have received the Adults Only rating from the ESRB due to its strong sexual content.

== Availability in public libraries ==
There has been controversy over The Joy of Sex in the United States. Religious groups have fought to keep it out of public libraries. In March 2008, the Nampa, Idaho, public library board ruled in favour of removing The Joy of Sex and The Joy of Gay Sex from the libraries' shelves, making them only available upon request in the library director's office. The books were restored to shelves in September 2008 in response to ACLU threats of litigation.

== Updated 2008 edition ==
Publisher Mitchell Beazley released an updated edition of the book in September 2008. The new edition was rewritten and reinvented by relationship psychologist Susan Quilliam and approved by Nicholas Comfort, the original author's son.

More material has been added to the book, and the remaining text has been rewritten from both a factual and psychological viewpoint to take into account social shifts since 1972. The new edition presents a more balanced female/male perspective and also contains 120 completely re-shot photographs and re-drawn illustrations.

The quirky style—and the message of the book, that sex is fun—remain the same. Mitchell Beazley has marketed the New Joy with the subtitle "a thinking person's guide to sex".

== Publication history ==
- The Joy of Sex: A Gourmet Guide to Lovemaking, 1972
- More Joy of Sex: A Lovemaking Companion to The Joy of Sex, 1973 (sequel)
- The Joy of Sex: A Gourmet Guide to Lovemaking, revised and updated edition, 1986 (revised to include AIDS)
- More Joy of Sex: A Lovemaking Companion to The Joy of Sex, revised and updated edition, 1987 (sequel; revised to include AIDS)
- The New Joy of Sex: A Gourmet Guide to Lovemaking for the Nineties, 1992 (revised to bring the science, especially the sociology, up to date)
- The Joy of Sex, 2003 (newly illustrated)
- The New Joy of Sex, by Alex Comfort and Susan Quilliam, 2008 (ISBN 1845334299, ISBN 9781845334291)

== See also ==
- Human sexual activity
- The Joy of Gay Sex
- Sex-positive movement
