= Aeschrion of Samos =

Ancient Greek poet

Aeschrion (Gr. Αἰσχρίων) was an iambic poet, and a native of Samos. He is mentioned by Athenaeus, who has preserved some choliambic verses of his, in which he defends the Samian Philaenis, claiming that the popular sex manual attributed to her was really written by Polycrates, an Athenian rhetorician and sophist. Some of his verses are also quoted by Tzetzes.

There was an epic poet of the same name, who was called a native of Mytilene and a pupil of Aristotle, and who is said to have accompanied Alexander the Great on some of his expeditions. He is mentioned in the Suda, and also by Tzetzes. As he was also a writer of iambics and choliambics, many scholars have supposed him to be identical with the Aeschrion from Samos, and to have been called a Mytilenaean in consequence of having resided for some time in that city.
