= Kshemendra =

Sanskrit poet (c. 990 – c. 1070 CE)

Kshemendra (IAST: Kṣemendra; c. 990 – c. 1070 CE) was an 11th-century Sanskrit polymath poet, satirist, philosopher, historian, dramatist, translator and art critic from Kashmir.

== Biography ==
Kshemendra was born into an old, cultured, and affluent family. His father was Prakashendra, a descendant of Narendra who was the minister to Jayapida. Both his education and literary output were broad and varied. He studied literature under "the foremost teacher of his time, the celebrated Shaiva philosopher and literary exponent Abhinavagupta". Kshemendra was born a Shaiva, but later became a Vaishnava. He studied and wrote about both Vaishnavism and Buddhism. His son, Somendra, provides details about his father in his introduction to the Avadana Kalpalata and other works. Kshemendra refers to himself in his works as Vyasadasa (IAST: Vyāsadāsa; Slave of Vyasa), a title which was perhaps won or adopted after the completion of his Bhāratamañjari.

Kshemendra was in great demand as a skilled abridger of long texts. His literary career extended from at least 1037 (his earliest dated work, Brihatkathāmanjari, a verse summary of the lost Northwestern Bṛhatkathā; itself a recension of Gunadhya's lost Bṛhatkathā – "Great Story") to 1066 (his latest dated work, Daśavataracharita, "an account of the ten incarnations of the god Viṣnu").

== Extant works ==
Around eighteen of Kshemendra's works are still extant while fourteen more are known only through references in other literature. In addition to the genres listed below, he also composed plays, descriptive poems, a satirical novel, a history, and possibly a commentary on the Kāma Sūtra.

=== Abridgements ===
- Ramāyaṇamanjari – Verse abridgement of the Ramayana (Sanskrit)
- Bhāratamanjari – Verse abridgement of the Mahabharata (Sanskrit)
- Brihatkathāmanjari – Verse abridgement of the Brihatkatha (Sanskrit)

=== Poetics ===
- Auchitya Vichāra Charchā
- Kavikanthābharaṇa
- Suvrittatilaka

=== Satires ===
- Kalāvilasā – "A Dalliance with Deceptions"
- Samaya Mātrikā – "The Courtesan's Keeper" (Sanskrit)
- Narmamālā – "A Garland of Mirth"
- Deśopadeśa – "Advice from the Countryside"

=== Didactic works ===
- Nitikalpataru
- Darpadalana
- Chaturvargasaṃgraha
- Chārucharya
- Sevyasevakopadeśa
- Lokaprakāśa
- Stūpāvadāna – See Saratchandra Das (ed.), Stupavadana, Journal and Text of the Buddhist Society of India, vol.II, part 1 (1894), pp. 13-18.

=== Devotional works ===
- Avadānakalpalatā – Former lives and good deeds of Buddha (English)
- Daśavataracharita – Ten incarnations of Vishnu (Sanskrit)

=== Historical Work ===
- Nrpavali
