= Kalyanamalla =

Indian poet from 15th–16th centuries

Kalyanamalla or Kalyan Malla was a 15th–16th-century Indian poet and writer of Ananga Ranga aka 'Stage of the Bodiless One', a sanskrit manuscript on 'Art of Love'. In the description of his ancestry, Kalyanmalla says he belongs to the Karpūra lineage and is explicitly described as “kārpūra-rājanya” (or “Karpūra rajanya”). The verse further praises him as a ruler of noble fame and martial prowess, suggesting that the inscriptional tradition represented him as a Karpūra Kshatriya or Karpūra Rajanya. The historical chronicle titled Saga of Kalyanamalla (कल्याणमल्ल चरितम्), authored by Vallabharayar, is based on the life and times of Kalyanamalla, who is known as Casanova of the East.

In one of his verses in Anangaranga, he speaks of the importance of a fine environment for sex:

Choose a courtyard that is high up in the mansion,

that is spacious, pleasant, and newly whitewashed,

that is perfumed by incense from aloe and other fragrant substances,

that is filled with the sound of musical instruments and is bright with lamplight.

Here let the man make love to the woman freely to his heart's content.

— Kalyanamalla, Anangaranga

Kalyana Malla is also known for his work Suleiman Charitra which is a fascinating blend of cultural traditions. He narrates a biblical tale in classical Sanskrit for his Muslim patron, a sixteenth-century Lodhi prince. The story of David and Bathsheba unfolds sensually, capturing the bathing scene, David's infatuation, his relentless pursuit, and their eventual union, all depicted through the shringara rasa, or the erotic mode, in the divine language of the gods, Classical Sanskrit. It's a Sanskrit rendering of Hebraic and Arabic tales which elegantly brings together the east and the west. In a verse, he wrote:

There was once a mighty lord of Ayodhya. In splendour and prowess, he was like Indra, the king of gods...Brave and devoted to public welfare, he was the famous King Ahmad, always kind and merciful, a bright jewel of the Lodi line.
