= Anthedon (Boeotia) =

Town in Boeotia, Ancient Greece

Coordinates: 38°29′55″N 23°26′56″E

Anthedon (Ancient Greek: Ἀνθηδών) was a town in Boeotia, Ancient Greece, located on the coast of the Gulf of Euboea, about 15 kilometres (9.3 mi) west of Chalcis, at the foot of Mount Messapius. It was member of the Amphictyonic League, and served as port for Thebes. In ancient times, it was believed to have had one of the mythical characters named Anthedon as its eponym.

The ruins of the town are situated 1 1/2 mile from the village Loukisia.

== Ancient accounts ==
The oldest mention of the city is found in Homer's Iliad, Catalogue of Ships, where it is given the epithet "furthermost", i. e. the most geographically remote town of Boeotia to the northern Gulf of Euboea.

Ancient inhabitants of Anthedon derived their origin from the sea-god Glaucus, who was believed to have been originally a native of the place. A surviving ancient coin now stored in the Archaeological Museum of Chalkis bears on one side a representation of Glaucus. The Anthedonians appear to have been a different race from the other people of Boeotia, and are described by one writer as Thracians (this is a misinterpretation; in this case Anthedon is a Thracian man and not Anthedon the city in Boeotia). Dicaearchus informs that they were chiefly mariners, shipwrights and fishermen, who derived their subsistence from trading in fish, purple (dye, from seashells), and sponges. He adds that the agora was surrounded with a double stoa, and planted with trees. An important archaeological guide to Anthedon is Pausanias' Description of Greece, which informs that there was a sacred grove of the Cabeiri in the middle of the town, surrounding a temple of those deities, and near it a temple of Demeter and Persephone. Outside the walls was a temple of Dionysus, and a spot called “the leap of Glaucus.” The wine of Anthedon was celebrated in antiquity.

The tomb of Iphimedeia and her sons, the Aloadae, was shown at Anthedon.

== Archaeology ==
The archaeological excavations that have taken place so far resulted in important discoveries, including temples of the Cabiri, Demeter and Persephone known from Pausanias' work. Also near the port has been found an Early Christian basilica of Late Roman years. The port of Anthedon was spacious for those times, and even had two jetties, the orifice of which could be closed with a chain in order to protect the harbor from enemy raids, as well as strong winds. The city suffered a decline during the Byzantine period, because of the raids of pirates. This forced residents to retreat inwards and specifically in the northern foothills of Mount Messapius (now Ktypas) and to establish a farmer settlement that became the nucleus of today's community Loukissia. During the transition from the beach to the foot of the mountain people made use of building material from the earlier buildings, of which was partly built the small church of St. George, now situated outside Loukisia. The temples of this structure provide valuable data for the study of Byzantine architecture and have been restored on behalf of the Ministry of Culture of Greece (July 2010). Excavations of the ancient port have been held by Greek as well as German and American archaeologists.
