= Kama Sutra (disambiguation) =

The Kama Sutra is an Indian text on sex and love.

Kama Sutra or Kamasutra may also refer to:

== Books ==
- Kamasutra (manga), a 1990 Japanese pornographic anime by Go Nagai

== Film ==
- Kama Sutra: A Tale of Love (1996 film)
- Kamasutra: The Revenge, 2013 Hindi/English movie by Rupesh Paul
- Tales of The Kama Sutra: The Perfumed Garden (2000 film)
- Tales of The Kama Sutra 2: Monsoon (2001 film)
- Kama Sutra (TV series), a 2000 television series

== Music ==
- Kamasutra (musician) Yaziza Entertainment
- Kama Sutra Records, a record label

=== Albums ===
- Kamasutra: Vollendung Der Liebe
- Kamasutra (NPG Orchestra album), an album by The NPG Orchestra, a pseudonym of Prince
- Kamasutra (Adassa album), a 2005 album by American reggaeton singer-songwriter Adassa
- Kamasutra (Alisha Chinai album), 1990

=== Songs ===
- "Kamasutra", Buddy De Franco
- "Kamasutra", song by Adassa from Kamasutra (Adassa album)
- "Kamasutra", song by Alisha from Kamasutra (Alisha Chinai album)
- "Kamasutra", song by Ruff Endz Someone to Love You
- "Kama Sutra", song by Jason Derulo and Kid Ink from Talk Dirty

== Other uses ==
- Kama Sutra (computer worm), a computer
- KamaSutra (brand), a brand name of condoms manufactured in India by JK Ansell Ltd.
- Kamasutra (chocolate), a Romanian chocolate

== See also ==
- Gamasutra
