= Legal Tender (film) =

- VHS cover
- Directed by: Jag Mundhra
- Screenplay by: Barry Roberts
- Produced by: Ashok Amritraj, Barry Roberts, Victor Bhalla, Brent Morris
- Starring: Tanya Roberts, Robert Davi, Morton Downey Jr.
- Cinematography: James Mathers
- Edited by: Brian Evans, David H. Lloyd
- Music by: William Kidd
- Production companies: Amritraj Productions, Prism Films, Shapiro-Glickenhaus Entertainment
- Distributed by: Prism Entertainment Corporation
- Release date: 1991 (United States)
- Running time: 95 minutes
- Country: United States
- Language: English

Legal Tender is a 1991 American erotic thriller film directed by Jag Mundhra and starring Tanya Roberts, Robert Davi, and Morton Downey Jr.

== Plot ==
Rikki Rennick and her drug-addicted brother Bud own a bar where she catches a poker player cheating. After a confrontation leads to an accident that leaves Bud disabled and uninsured, Rikki turns to shady insurance millionaire Mal Connery for a loan.

After a man she just met, Phil Trask, is brutally murdered by masked intruders, Rikki unknowingly ends up with a diskette containing evidence of Connery's crimes. Connery sends hitmen after her, but she is protected by her friend, private detective Fix Cleary.

== Cast ==
- Tanya Roberts as Rikki Rennick
- Robert Davi as Fix Cleary
- Morton Downey Jr. as Mal Connery
- Carlos Palomino as Detective Hernandez
- Michael Greene as Ed Thorpe
- Charles McCaughan as Bud Rennick
- Maria Rangel as Lorrie De Luca
- Wendy McDonald as Verna
- Robert Dean as Bobby Westcott
- Donald Nardini as Tony
- Craig Stepp as Phil Trask
- Pete Koch as Rudy Dushak
- Daryl Roach as Willy
