= Pete Koch =

American actor and football player (born 1962)

Peter Koch
No. 71, 74
- Position: Defensive lineman

Personal information
- Born: January 23, 1962 (age 64); New Hyde Park, New York, U.S.
- Listed height: 6 ft 6 in (1.98 m)
- Listed weight: 270 lb (122 kg)

Career information
- High school: Memorial (New Hyde Park)
- College: Maryland
- NFL draft: 1984: 1st round, 16th overall pick

Career history
- Cincinnati Bengals (1984); Kansas City Chiefs (1985–1988); Los Angeles Raiders (1989)

Awards and highlights
- First-team All-ACC (1983)

Career NFL statistics
- Sacks: 8
- Stats at Pro Football Reference

Peter Alan Koch (born January 23, 1962) is an American actor and former professional football player. He played college football for the Maryland Terrapins.

== Early life, family and education ==
Peter Koch was born and raised in New Hyde Park, New York on Long Island. He attended New Hyde Park Memorial High School.

He attended college on a full athletic scholarship at University of Maryland, College Park and played for the Terrapins under coaches Jerry Claiborne and Bobby Ross.

Years later, Koch attended free medical studies classes at UCLA in furtherance of his efforts as a personal trainer.

== Professional football ==
Koch was a defensive end who played five seasons in the National Football League, for the Cincinnati Bengals (1984), the Kansas City Chiefs (1985–1987), and the Los Angeles Raiders (1989).

He was selected 16th overall in the first round of the 1984 NFL draft. One round later, the Bengals drafted Koch's Maryland teammate, quarterback Boomer Esiason. Their teammate, Frank Reich, was selected into the NFL the next season and is formerly the head coach of the Carolina Panthers.

== Other pursuits ==
Koch became an actor on television and feature films. He also appeared in television commercials, including ones for Ford trucks, Kay Jewelers and KTM motorcycles. He received his SAG card in 1985. He also became a certified personal trainer, attending free medical studies classes at UCLA.

== Selected filmography ==
Film

- 1986 Heartbreak Ridge as Private "Swede" Johanson
- 1986 Heat as Tiel
- 1988 Johnny Be Good as Pete Andropolous
- 1989 Loverboy as Claude Delancy
- 1991 Legal Tender as Rudy Dushak
- 1993 Sunset Grill as Christian
- 1997 Conspiracy Theory as Fire Captain

Television

- 1992 Silk Stalkings as J.T. "The Hangman" Martin (episode "Blo-Dri")
- 1992 Renegade as Boone Avery (episode "Hunting Accident")
- 1994 Island City as Lieutenant Michael Mendi
- 1999 Nash Bridges as Bart Mackie (episode "Pump Action")
- 1999 Sliders as Ike (episode "The Unstuck Man")
- 2009 FlashForward as Paramedic #2 (episode "No More Good Days")
- 2014 Enlisted as The Swede (episode "Vets")
