= Kamasutra (chocolate) =

Romanian chocolate

- Type: Chocolate
- Place of origin: Romania
- Created by: Florin Balan
- Main ingredients: Chocolate

Kamasutra is a Romanian chocolate shaped like kamasutra positions. The Kamasutra chocolate was invented in 2007 by Florin Balan and distributed by the chocolate factory SC Pralin SRL at Cisnădie in Sibiu County. It is most often consumed in Romania during Saint Valentine day. Chocolate Kamasutra was inspired by Khajurajo temple and is available in four sizes 40g, 70g, 200g and 350g. Kamasutra chocolates are being marketed as a mood enhancing gift for a partner. It is suggested by creators to be used as a romantic way of suggesting new sexual experiences which can lead to a healthier relationship.

A French chocolatier named Jacques Bockel also produces chocolates called kamasutra, starting in France in 2011 and available till this day.
