= Last Call (1991 film) =

- Promotional film poster
- Directed by: Jag Mundhra
- Written by: Steven Iyama
- Produced by: Ashok Amritraj
- Starring: William Katt; Shannon Tweed; Joseph Campanella; Stella Stevens
- Cinematography: James Mathers
- Edited by: Brian Evans
- Music by: Michael Bishop
- Distributed by: Paramount Pictures
- Release date: February 7, 1991
- Running time: 90 minutes
- Country: United States
- Language: English

Last Call is a 1991 American erotic thriller film about a woman who decides to take revenge on an estate agent who killed her mother. The film was directed by Jag Mundhra, and stars William Katt, Shannon Tweed, and Joseph Campanella.

== Cast ==
- Shannon Tweed as Cindy / Audrey
- William Katt as Paul Avery

== Reception ==
William Thomas of Empire rated the film 1/5 stars and wrote, "The sleeve says Last Call is steamier than Wild Orchid and more revealing than Two Moon Junction. Unfortunately, with what passes as humping completely incidental to the plot, all it does is make both of those turkeys look almost interesting".

== Home media ==
The film was initially released on VHS and LaserDisc in R-rated and unrated versions. The unrated version featured extended sex scenes between Tweed and Katt, and was released in Europe and Australia as the only cut of the film. It did not see DVD release until 2019, when MVD released the R-rated cut as a double pack with Bitter Harvest.
