= Jag Mundhra =

Indian director and screenwriter

- Born: 29 October 1948; Nagpur, India
- Died: 4 September 2011 (aged 62); Mumbai, India
- Education: Michigan State University; IIT Bombay
- Occupation: Director
- Spouse: Chandra Mundhra
- Children: Smriti Mundhra
- Awards: Zanzibar International Film Festival Golden Dhow (2001); Bollywood Movie Awards (2001); Political Film Society, USA (PFS) Award – Peace Category (2004); Audience Choice Award Bermuda International Film Festival (2001)

Jagmohan "Jag" Mundhra (29 October 1948 – 4 September 2011) was an Indian director, producer, and screenwriter, best known for his early career as an American exploitation film writer-director.

== Family and early life ==
Mundhra was born at Nagpur and grew up in a Marwari locality in Calcutta in a conservative family where films were frowned upon. He nevertheless nurtured a secret ambition to become a filmmaker. His childhood, as of other Indians of his generation, was a tough one, counting pennies for the tram that rode to the other, affluent side of the city, and withstanding his family's strict traditions. According to Mundhra, "The family was very conservative and my grand mother was very strict and we were allowed to see maybe a couple of films a year and that too of the Har Har Mahadev variety. ... Even as a child I never saw myself as a young Marwari boy but a lot beyond that. In those days, the word global citizen was not there, but inside I felt like one".

A key influence on Mundhra was his admission to the highly competitive and prestigious IIT Bombay. In his words, "I had studied in a Hindi medium school up to 9th grade and always admired people who spoke English fluently. IIT taught me a lot of humility. In my wing, there were students who were from different states, and as far as English went, this person from Bihar who couldn't speak English to save his life outshone everyone else with his brilliance. I did well, but realized very early on while in IIT that engineering was not for me. I would be very unhappy if I was to live my life being an engineer, but I stuck it out because I didn't want to let my parents down". He pursued a master's degree in electrical engineering but switched to a PhD program in motion pictures at University of Michigan, before embarking on his film career.

== Career ==
After his first dramas, Suraag (1982), and the socially-relevant film, Kamla (1984), Mundhra directed, in the late 1980s and the 1990s, a string of horror and erotic thriller movies for theatrical distribution and direct to video, including The Jigsaw Murders (1988), Hack-O-Lantern (1988), Night Eyes (1990), The Other Women (1992), L.A. Goddess (1993), Sexual Malice (1994), Tales of The Kama Sutra: The Perfumed Garden (2000), and Tales of The Kama Sutra 2: Monsoon (2001).

Beginning with Bawandar (2000), which he directed under the name Jagmohan, Mundhra was back to issue-oriented films. Bawandar is about the fight of a poor woman for justice and was based on the story of a Rajasthani woman, Bhanwari Devi. After the film's release, Ashok Gehlot, the Chief Minister of Rajasthan, called Mundhra and said, "Aapke bawandar ne bada bawander machaya hai." He gave Rs 50,000 and land to Bhanwari Devi and also money for her son's education. To Mundhra, "It's not a movie about rape, but the empowerment of a woman. This character could be fictitious and yet the story would have had the same powerful message". In his own words, Kamla, Bawandar and Provoked (2006) are his trilogy of strong female-centric films.

At the time of his death, Mundhra was working on a film based on the life of Sonia Gandhi. Mundhra was also a life member of the International Film & Television Club of the Asian Academy of Film & Television.

== Filmography ==
- Suraag (1982)
- Kamla (1984)
- Open House (1987)
- The Jigsaw Murders (1988)
- Hack-O-Lantern (1988)
- Eyewitness to Murder (1989)
- Night Eyes (1990)
- Legal Tender (1991)
- Vishkanya (1991)
- Last Call (1991)
- The Other Women (1992)
- Wild Cactus (1993)
- L.A. Goddess (1993)
- Tropical Heat (1993)
- Sexual Malice (1994)
- Improper Conduct (1994)
- Irresistible Impulse (1996)
- Tainted Love (1996)
- Shades of Gray (1997)
- Ek Zara Si Wafa (1999)
- Tales of The Kama Sutra: The Perfumed Garden (2000)
- Bawandar (2000)
- Tales of The Kama Sutra 2: Monsoon (2001)
- Private Moments (2005)
- Provoked (2006)
- Backwaters (2006)
- Natasha (2007)
- Shoot on Sight (2007)
- Apartment (2010)
- Chase (2010)
- Naughty @ 40 (2011)

== Personal life ==
Mundhra is the father of Academy Award-nominated director/producer Smriti Mundhra.

== Death ==
Mundhra died in Mumbai on 4 September 2011, aged 62, from pneumonia and multiple organ failure.
