= Improper Conduct (1994 film) =

1994 film

- Directed by: Jag Mundhra
- Screenplay by: Carl Austin
- Story by: Jag Mundhra
- Produced by: Jag Mundhra; Subhash Bal (co-producer); Victor Bhalla (co-producer)
- Starring: Steven Bauer; Tahnee Welch; John Laughlin; Nia Peeples; Stuart Whitman
- Cinematography: James Michaels
- Edited by: Wayne Schmidt; David Schulman
- Music by: Alan DerMarderosian
- Production company: Everest Pictures Inc.
- Release date: June 9, 1994
- Country: United States
- Language: English

Improper Conduct is a film released in 1994 by Everest Pictures directed by Jag Mundhra and starring Steven Bauer, Tahnee Welch and Nia Peeples.

== Plot ==
The Chairman of an advertising company announces the new corporate manager at the company Christmas party - his son-in-law. This is a nightmare to the long time employees, but the nightmare increases when he sexually harasses the good looking women in the company. But after he assaults one in an elevator, she decides to fight back. Hiring an attorney, she takes him to court - and loses. Because of her desperation, she ends up being killed in an auto crash. Her sister then goes undercover at the company to take revenge on the manager.

== Reception ==
Kevin Thomas of the L.A. Times says "Improper Conduct plays like a crisp, decently made TV movie, whereupon it veers unexpectedly and effectively in an entirely different direction. Having pointed up the pitfalls of women trying to fight back against sexual harassment, Mundhra and writer Carl Austin deftly move the film from courtroom drama to erotic suspense."
