= Wajida Tabassum =

Indian writer (1935–2011)

- Born: 16 March 1935; Amravati, British India
- Died: 7 December 2011 (aged 76); Mumbai, Maharashtra, India
- Occupation: Writer
- Writing career
- Language: Urdu

Wajida Tabassum (16 March 1935 – 7 December 2011) was an Indian writer of fiction, verses and songs in the Urdu language. She wrote 27 books. Some of her stories have been made into movies and Indian television serials. Her controversial 1975 story titled "Utran" (translated as 'Cast-Offs' or 'Hand-Me Downs') was made into a popular soap opera on Indian television in 1988. "Utran" was reprinted in English translation as part of an anthology of 20 short stories titled Such Devoted Sisters in 1994, and from there was made into a movie in 1996 under the title Kama Sutra: A Tale of Love, with a script by Mira Nair and Helena Kriel.

== Biography ==
Wajida Tabassum was born in Amravati, Maharashtra in 1935. She graduated from Osmania University with a degree in Urdu language. After graduation her family moved from Amravati to Hyderabad where she started writing stories in Urdu in the Dakhini dialect from 1940 in the backdrop of the aristocratic social life of Hyderabad. She married her cousin Ashfaq Ahmad in 1960; he was employed with Indian Railways. After his retirement he published all her books. They settled in Bombay and had five children, four sons and one daughter.

Wajida Tabassum's stories started appearing in the monthly magazine Biswin Sadi ('twentieth century'). These stories were erotic in style as she brought out the life styles of the Hyderabadi nawabs, which was considered "luxurious and amorous". Her collection of stories was first published as Shahr-e Mamnu ('Forbidden City') in 1960; it became very popular and received critical acclaim. Literary critic Mujtaba Hussain observed that "she was the first story writer after Chughtai who can be called sahib-e-asloob, a writer with distinct style." He also lamented that she crossed the "limits of decorum (and decency)" in her stories. The story titled "Utran" (meaning 'discarded clothes'), which was made into a film and a Hindi TV serial, was a literary achievement for her. Her other stories titled "Nath ka bojh" (Burden of The Nose-Ring), "Haur Upar" (A little Higher) and "Nath Utarwai" (Removal of the nose-ring) were controversial, as there was more of an erotic element in these stories. During the 1960 and 1970s the erotic stories which she wrote were published in the magazine titled Shama, for which she received very handsome payments at that time. However, she withdrew from the writing scene as she suffered from arthritis and led a secluded life in her home in Mumbai, although her house was used for shooting of films. She died on 7 December 2011 in Mumbai.

== Publications ==
Apart from "Utran", some of her other published books are:

- Teh Khana (1968)
- Kaise Samjhaoon (1977)
- Phul Khilne Do (1977)
- Zakhm-e Dil aur Mahak, aur Mahak (1978)
- Zar Zan Zamin (1989).
