= Tales of The Kama Sutra: The Perfumed Garden =

- Directed by: Jag Mundhra
- Written by: Randor Guy
- Screenplay by: Thomas A. Fucci
- Produced by: Gregory Cascante; Ram Kay
- Starring: Gigi St. Blaque; Amy Lindsay; Rajeshwari Sachdev; Nassar; Kim Dawson; Ivan Baccarat
- Cinematography: Ashok Kumar
- Edited by: Tom Barger
- Music by: Tor Hyams
- Distributed by: Angles Entertainment
- Release date: 19 September 2000
- Running time: 120 minutes
- Country: United States
- Language: English

Tales of The Kama Sutra: The Perfumed Garden is a 2000 Indo-American drama film directed by Jag Mundhra, with original soundtrack by Tor Hyams. The film takes its title from the ancient Indian text the Kama Sutra.

The film is also referred to as simply Perfumed Garden or (The) Perfumed Garden: Tales of The Kama Sutra.

The film's art director was P. Krishnamoorthy.

== Plot ==
An American couple, Michael and Lisa travel to India to restore an erotic sex goddess sculpture in Khajuraho; they are immediately acquainted with the Vatsayana Kama Sutra in a fictional set up of Kamasutra school. The couple are acquainted with Lochni, a Royal Kamasutra expert.

== Themes ==
The film was said to be, "like his earlier film Kamla, based on a true love story about woman exploitation in rural India." The film is also described as "(n)ot particularly erotic".

== Dubbed versions ==
The film was dubbed into Hindi, Tamil and Telugu and as Brahmachari.

== See also ==
- Kama Sutra: A Tale of Love
- Tales of The Kama Sutra 2: Monsoon
- Kamasutra 3D
- Kamasutra Nights: Maya
