= Kama Sutra =

Ancient Hindu text on erotic love

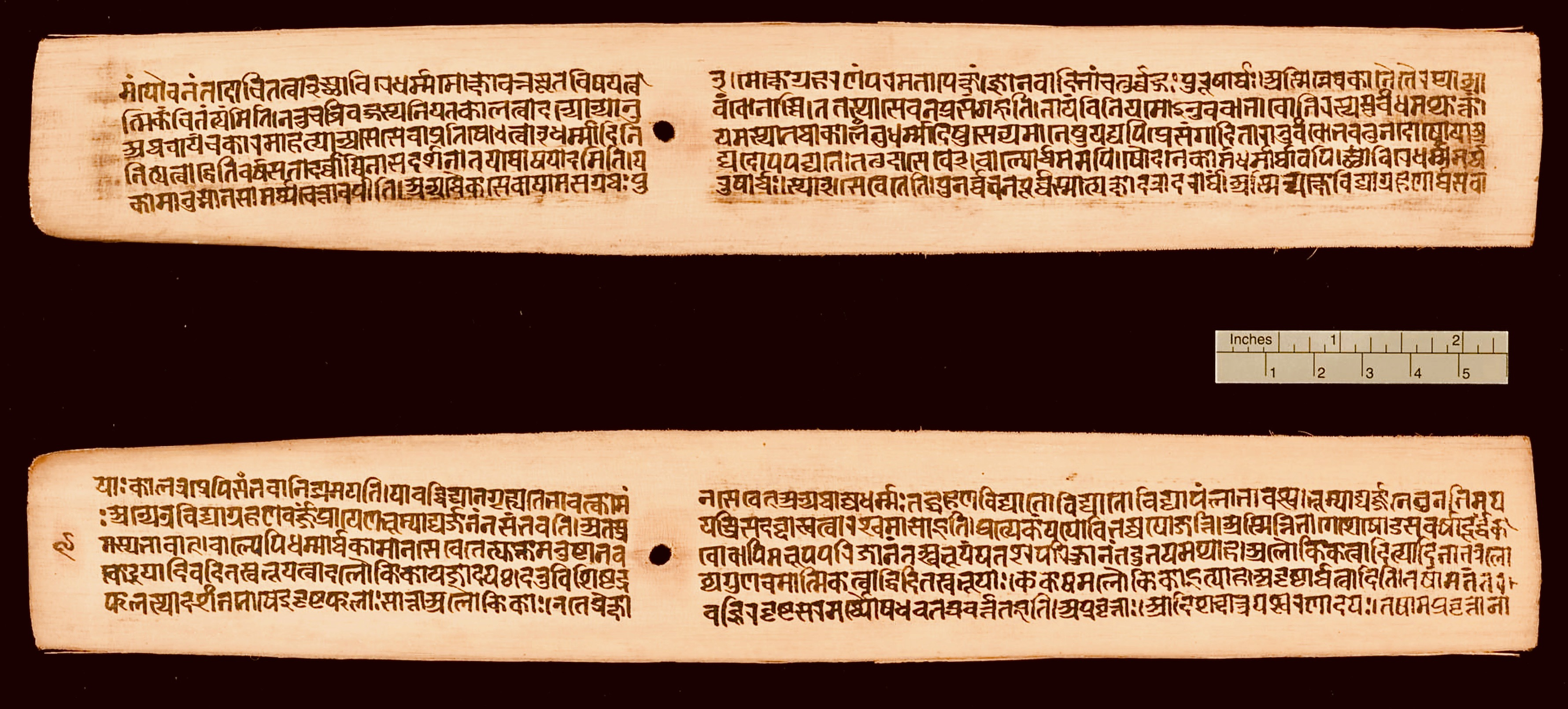
- Two folios from a palm leaf manuscript of the Kamasutra text (Sanskrit, Devanagari script)
- Author: Vatsyayana Mallanaga
- Original title: कामसूत्र
- Translator: Many
- Language: Sanskrit
- Subject: Erotic love
- Genre: Sutra Literature
- Set in: 2nd–3rd century CE
- Published: 3rd century CE
- Publication place: Classical Age, India
- English publication date: 1883
- Text: Kama Sutra at Wikisource

The Kama Sutra, in English also spelled Kamasutra (/ˈkɑːmə ˈsuːtrə/; Sanskrit: कामसूत्र,, Kāma-sūtra; lit. 'Principles of Love'), is an ancient Sanskrit text on sexuality, eroticism, and emotional fulfillment. Attributed to Vātsyāyana, the Kamasutra is neither exclusively nor predominantly a sex manual on sex positions, but rather a guide on the art of living well, the nature of love, finding partners, maintaining sex life, and other aspects pertaining to pleasure-oriented faculties. It is a sutra-genre text with terse aphoristic verses that have survived into the modern era with different bhāṣyas (commentaries). The text is a mix of prose and anustubh-meter poetry verses.

The Kamasutra acknowledges the Hindu concept of purusharthas, and lists desire, sexuality, and emotional fulfillment as one of the proper goals of life. It discusses methods for courtship, training in the arts to be socially engaging, finding a partner, flirting, maintaining power in a married life, when and how to commit adultery, sexual positions, and other topics. The text majorly deals with the philosophy and theory of love, what triggers desire, what sustains it, and how and when it is good or bad.

The text is one of many Indian texts on Kama Shastra. It is a much-translated work in Indian and non-Indian languages, and has influenced many secondary texts that followed since the 4th century CE, as well as the Indian arts as exemplified by the pervasive presence of Kama-related reliefs and sculpture in old Hindu temples. Of these, the Khajuraho in Madhya Pradesh is a UNESCO World Heritage Site. Among the surviving temples, one in Rajasthan has all the major chapters and sexual positions sculpted to illustrate the Kamasutra.

According to Wendy Doniger, the Kamasutra became "one of the most pirated books in English language" soon after it was published in 1883 by Richard Burton. This first European edition by Burton does not faithfully reflect much in the Kamasutra because he revised the collaborative translation by Bhagavanlal Indrajit and Shivaram Parashuram Bhide with Forster Arbuthnot to suit 19th-century Victorian tastes.

== Date and authorship ==
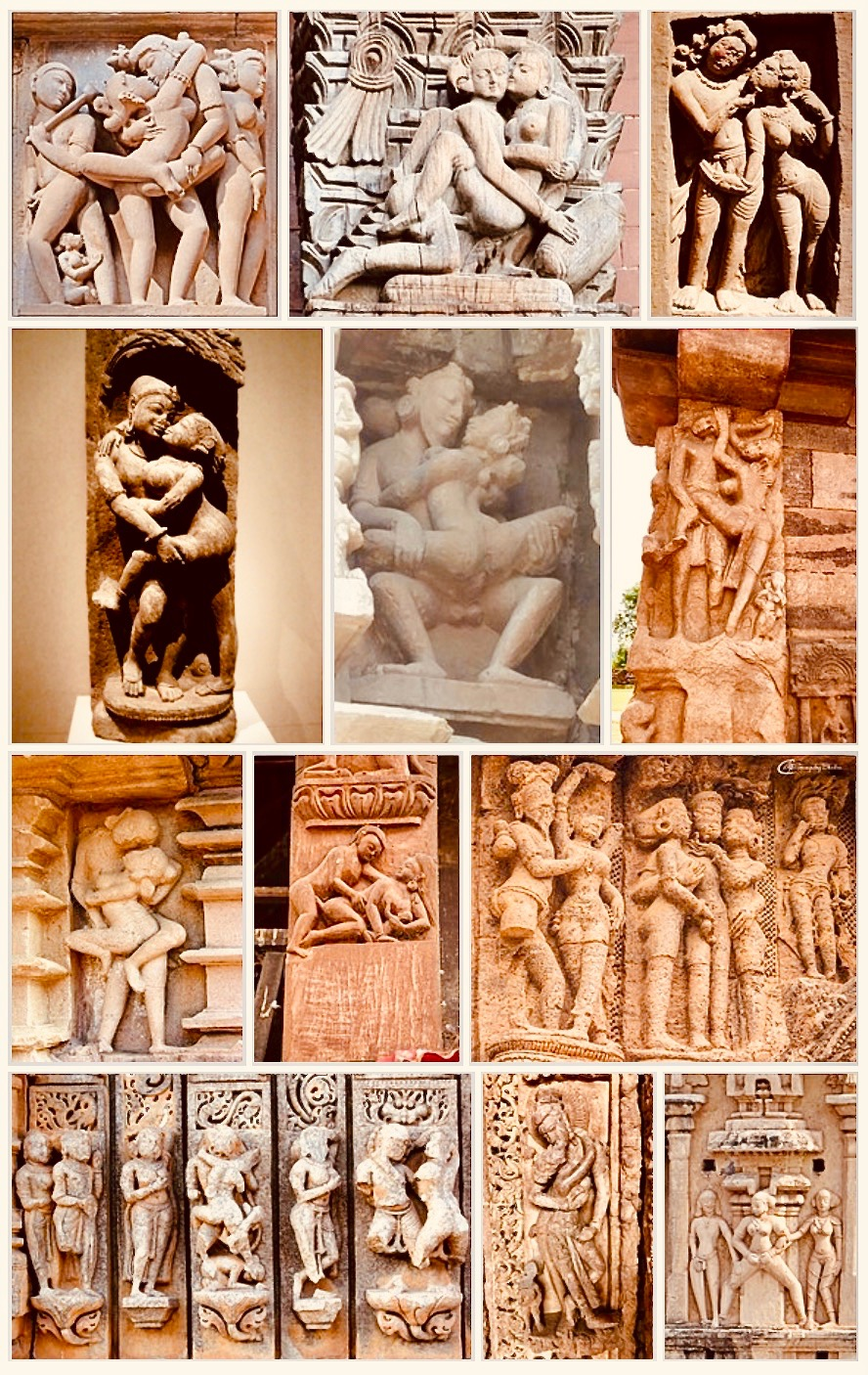
Kama-related arts are common in Hindu temples. These scenes include courtship, amorous couples in scenes of intimacy (mithuna), or a sexual position. Above: 6th- to 14th-century temples in Madhya Pradesh, Uttar Pradesh, Rajasthan, Gujarat, Karnataka, Chhattisgarh, Odisha, Tamil Nadu, Andhra Pradesh and Nepal.

The original composition date or century for the Kamasutra is unknown. Historians have variously placed it between 400 BCE and 300 CE. (Note: Sengupta cites only on the 300/400 BCE dating, with the other authors below citing the dating to occur up until 300 CE) According to John Keay, the Kama Sutra is a compendium that was collected into its present form in the 2nd century CE. In contrast, the Indologist Wendy Doniger, who had co-translated the Kama Sutra and published many papers on related Hindu texts, stated that the surviving version of the Kama Sutra must have been revised or composed after 225 CE because it mentions the Abhiras and the Andhras, dynasties that did not co-rule major regions of ancient India before that year. The text makes no mention of the Gupta Empire, which ruled over major urban areas of ancient India, reshaping arts, culture, and economy from the 4th century through the 6th century CE. For these reasons, she dates the Kama Sutra to the second half of the 3rd century CE. Doniger notes Kama Sutra was composed "sometime in the third century of the common era, most likely in its second half, at the dawn of the Gupta Empire".

The place of its composition is also unclear. The likely candidates are urban centers of north India, alternatively in the eastern urban Pataliputra (now Patna). Vatsyayana Mallanaga is its widely accepted author because his name is embedded in the colophon verse, but little is known about him. Vatsyayana states that he wrote the text after much meditation. In the preface, Vatsyayana acknowledges that he is distilling many ancient texts, but these have not survived. He cites the work of others he calls "teachers" and "scholars", and the longer texts by Auddalaki, Babhravya, Dattaka, Suvarnanabha, Ghotakamukha, Gonardiya, Gonikaputra, Charayana, and Kuchumara.

Kamasutra was considered to have been put together from a 150 chapter manuscript that had itself been distilled from 300 chapters which in turn came from a compilation of some 100,000 chapters of text. It was thought to have been written in its final form sometime between the third and fifth century CE. Vatsyayana's Kamasutra is mentioned and some verses quoted in the Brihatsamhita of Varahamihira, as well as the poems of Kalidasa. This suggests he lived before the 5th-century CE.

== Background ==
=== Purusharthas ===
The Hindu tradition has the concept of the Purusharthas which outlines "four main goals of life". It holds that every human being has four proper goals that are necessary and sufficient for a fulfilling and happy life:

- Dharma – signifies behaviors that are considered to be in accord with rta, the order that makes life and universe possible, and includes duties, rights, laws, conduct, virtues and right way of living. Hindu dharma includes the religious duties, moral rights and duties of each individual, as well as behaviors that enable social order, right conduct, and those that are virtuous. Dharma, according to Van Buitenen, is that which all existing beings must accept and respect to sustain harmony and order in the world. It is, states Van Buitenen, the pursuit and execution of one's nature and true calling, thus playing one's role in cosmic concert.
- Artha – signifies the "means of life", activities and resources that enables one to be in a state one wants to be in. Artha incorporates wealth, career, activity to make a living, financial security and economic prosperity. The proper pursuit of artha is considered an important aim of human life in Hinduism.
- Kama – signifies desire, wish, passion, emotions, pleasure of the senses, the aesthetic enjoyment of life, affection, or love, with or without sexual connotations. Gavin Flood explains kāma as "love" without violating dharma (moral responsibility), artha (material prosperity) and one's journey towards moksha (spiritual liberation).
- Moksha – signifies emancipation, liberation or release. In some schools of Hinduism, moksha connotes freedom from saṃsāra, the cycle of death and rebirth, in other schools moksha connotes freedom, self-knowledge, self-realization and liberation in this life.

Each of these pursuits became a subject of study and led to prolific Sanskrit and some Prakrit languages literature in ancient India. Along with Dharmasastras, Arthasastras and Mokshasastras, the Kamasastras genre have been preserved in palm leaf manuscripts. The Kamasutra belongs to the Kamasastra genre of texts. Other examples of Hindu Sanskrit texts on sexuality and emotions include the Ratirahasya (called Kokashastra in some Indian scripts), the Anangaranga, the Nagarasarvasva, the Kandarpachudmani, and the Panchasayaka.

The defining object of the Indian Kamasastra literature, according to Laura Desmond – an anthropologist and a professor of Religious Studies, is the "harmonious sensory experience" from a good relationship between "the self and the world", by discovering and enhancing sensory capabilities to "affect and be affected by the world". Vatsyayana predominantly discusses Kama along with its relationship with Dharma and Artha. He makes a passing mention of Moksha in some verses.

The earthly vision of our sages leaves nothing indifferent. It is their compassion that sees perfection in everything, that is why the sages created the Kama Shastra. Such a possibility is difficult to find in the ancient world outside India. Especially in the Semitic world, it is unimaginable. If any knowledge is recognized by the Rishi Darshan, it becomes universal to that extent; it also becomes universal. How can there be Shastrasiddhi without Brahmacharya? That is why Vatsayana Maharshi, who created the Kama Shastra, is a Brahmachari; Sri Krishna, who gave us the Moksha Shastra, is also a Brahmachari; all of them are Brahmacharis, eat and fast.

It is inappropriate to limit Kama Shastra to erotics or sexology. Kama is an untranslatable concept because it aims at the pleasure of the five senses of action as well as the pleasure of the five senses of knowledge and thereby the pleasure of the inner mind. Like Dharma-Rasas-Brahma, Kama also has an untranslatable meaning.

The vision of Maharishi Vatsyayana is indispensable and beneficial for world culture.

— Shatavadhani Dr. R. Ganesh

Vatsyayana's Kamasutra pays tribute not only to kama but also to all three components of the trivarga. The trivarga are dharma, artha, and kama. According to Vatsyayana, all three components of the trivarga are śāstra, that is, worthy of being learned and learned, and prakṛti. The Kamasutra emphasizes that all three components of the trivarga are interrelated. No one component of the trivarga should be complementary to the other two components, nor should any component be detrimental to the other.

=== Vedic heritage ===
The earliest foundations of the kamasutra are found in the Vedic era literature of Hinduism. Vatsyayana acknowledges this heritage in verse 1.1.9 of the text where he names Svetaketu Uddalaka as the "first human author of the kamasutra". Uddalaka is an early Upanishadic rishi (scholar-poet, sage), whose ideas are found in the Brihadaranyaka Upanishad such as in section 6.2, and the Chandogya Upanishad such as over the verses 5.3 through 5.10. These Hindu scriptures are variously dated between 900 BCE and 700 BCE, according to the Indologist and Sanskrit scholar Patrick Olivelle. Among with other ideas such as Atman (self, soul) and the ontological concept of Brahman, these early Upanishads discuss human life, activities and the nature of existence as a form of internalized worship, where sexuality and sex is mapped into a form of religious yajna ritual (sacrificial fire, Agni) and suffused in spiritual terms:

A fire – that is what a woman is, Gautama.
Her firewood is the vulva,
her smoke is the pubic hair,
her flame is the vagina,
when one penetrates her, that is her embers,
and her sparks are the climax.
In that very fire the gods offer semen,
and from that offering springs a man.

— Brihadaranyaka Upanishad 6.2.13, c. 700 BCE, Trans.: Patrick Olivelle

According to the Indologist De, a view with which Doniger agrees, this is one of the many evidences that the kamasutra began in the religious literature of the Vedic era, ideas that were ultimately refined and distilled into a sutra-genre text by Vatsyayana. According to Doniger, this paradigm of celebrating pleasures, enjoyment and sexuality as a dharmic act began in the "earthy, vibrant text known as the Rigveda" of the Hindus. The Kamasutra and celebration of sex, eroticism and pleasure is an integral part of the religious milieu in Hinduism and quite prevalent in its temples.

=== Epics ===
Human relationships, sex and emotional fulfillment are a significant part of the post-Vedic Sanskrit literature such as the major Hindu epics: the Mahabharata and the Ramayana. The ancient Indian view has been, states Johann Meyer, that love and sex are a delightful necessity. Though she is reserved and selective, "a woman stands in very great need of surata (amorous or sexual pleasure)", and "the woman has a far stronger erotic disposition, her delight in the sexual act is greater than a man's".

== Manuscripts ==
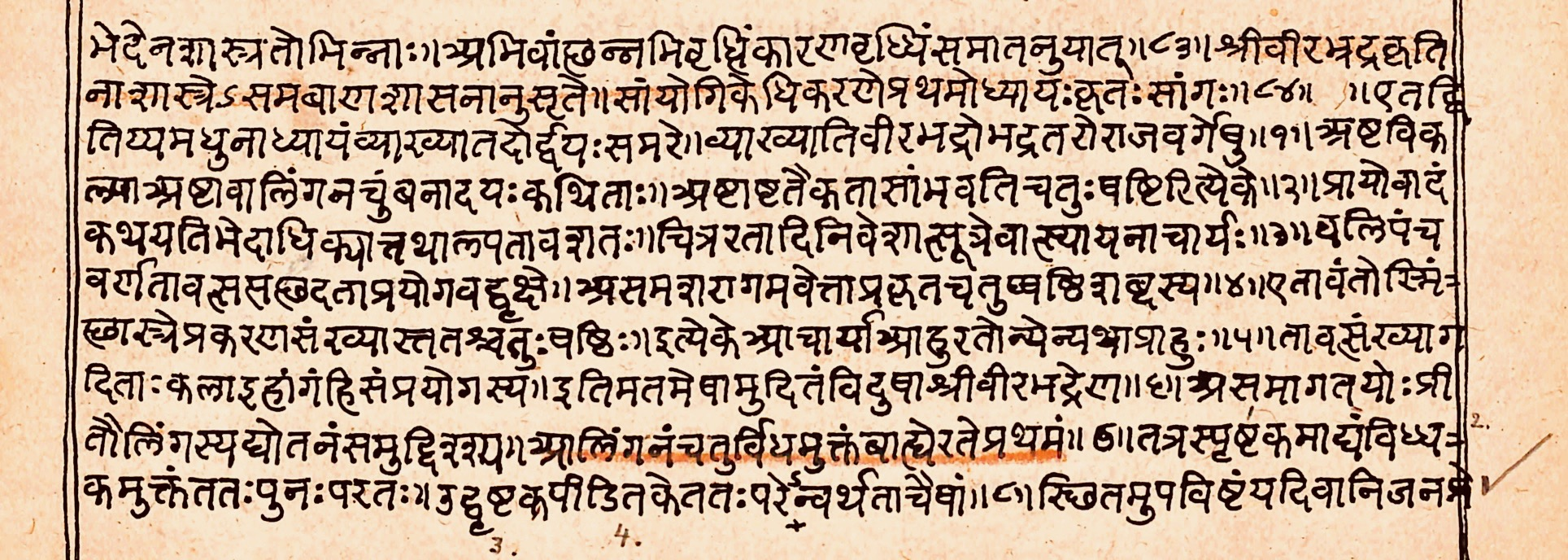
A Kamasutra manuscript page preserved in the vaults of the Raghunath Temple in Jammu & Kashmir

The Kamasutra manuscripts have survived in many versions across the Indian subcontinent. While attempting to get a translation of the Sanskrit kama-sastra text Ananga Ranga, which had already been widely translated by the Hindus in their regional languages such as Marathi, associates of the British Orientalist Richard Burton, stumbled into portions of the Kamasutra manuscript. Burton then commissioned the Sanskrit scholar Bhagvanlal Indraji to locate a complete Kamasutra manuscript and translate it. Indraji collected variant manuscripts of the text in libraries and temples of Varanasi, Kolkata and Jaipur. Burton later published an edited English translation of these manuscripts, but not a critical edition of the Kamasutra in Sanskrit.

According to S.C. Upadhyaya, known for his 1961 scholarly study and a more accurate translation of the Kamasutra, there are issues with the manuscripts that have survived and the text likely underwent revisions over time. This is confirmed by other 1st-millennium CE Hindu texts on kama that mention and cite the Kamasutra, but some of these quotations credited to the Kamasutra by these historic authors "are not to be found in the text of the Kamasutra" that have survived.

== Structure ==
Vatsyayana's Kamasutra states it has 1,250 verses distributed over 36 chapters in 64 sections organised into 7 books. This statement is included in the opening chapter, a common practice in ancient Hindu texts, likely to prevent major and unauthorized expansions of a popular text. The text that has survived into the modern era has 67 sections, and this list is enumerated in Book 7 and in Yashodhara's Sanskrit commentary (bhasya) on the text.

The Kamasutra uses a mixture of prose and poetry, and the narration has the form of a dramatic fiction where two characters called nayaka (man) and nayika (woman), are aided by the characters called pitamarda (libertine), vita (pander) and vidushaka (jester). This format follows the teachings found in the Sanskrit classic Natyasastra. The teachings and discussions found in the Kamasutra extensively incorporate ancient Hindu mythology and legends.

Kamasutra
Book.Chapter	Verses	Topics
1		General remarks
1.1	1–24	Preface, history of kama literature, outline of the contents
1.2	1–40	Suitable age for kama knowledge, the three goals of life: dharma, Artha, Kama; their essential interrelationship, natural human questions
1.3	1–22	Preparations for kama, sixty four arts for a better quality of life, how girls can learn and train in these arts, their lifelong benefits and contribution to better kama
1.4	1–39	The life of an urban gentleman, work routine, entertainment and festivals, sports, picnics, socialization, games, entertainment and drinking parties, finding aids (messengers, friends, helpers) to improve success in kama, options for rural gentlemen, what one must never do in their pursuit of kama
1.5	1–37	Types of women, finding sexual partners, sex, being lovers, being faithful, permissible women, adultery and when to commit it, the forbidden women whom one must avoid, discretion with messengers and helpers, few dos and don't in life
2		Amorous advances/sexual union
2.1	1–45	Sexual relationships and the pleasure of sex, uniqueness of every lover, temperaments, sizes, endurance, foreplay, types of love and lovers, duration of sex, types of climax, intimacy, joy
2.2	1–31	Figuring out if someone is interested, conversations, prelude and preparation, touching each other, massage, embracing
2.3–5	1–32, 1–31, 1–43	Kissing, where to kiss and how, teasing each other and games, signals and hints for the other person, cleanliness, taking care of teeth, hair, body, nails, physical non-sexual forms of intimacy (scratching, poking, biting, slapping, holding her)
2.6–10	1–52	Intercourse, what it is and how, positions, various methods, bringing variety, usual and unusual sex, communicating before and during intercourse (moaning), diverse regional practices and customs, the needs of a man, the needs of a woman, variations and surprises, oral sex for women, oral sex for men, opinions, disagreements, experimenting with each other, the first time, why sexual excitement fades, reviving passion, quarreling, keeping sex exciting, sixty four methods to find happiness in a committed relationship
3		Acquiring a wife
3.1	1–24	Marriage, finding the right girl, which one to avoid, which one to persuade, how to decide, how to proceed, making alliances
3.2–3	1–35, 1–32	Earning her trust, importance of not rushing things and being gentle, moving towards sexual openness gradually, how to approach a woman, proceeding to friendship, from friendship to intimacy, interpreting different responses of a girl
3.4–5	1–55, 1–30	Earning his trust, knowing the man and his advances, how a woman can make advances, winning the heart; utilizing confidants of your lover, types of marriage, formalizing marriage, eloping
4		Duties and privileges of the wife
4.1–2	1–48, 1–30	Being a wife, her life, conduct, power over the household, duties when her husband is away, nuclear and joint families, when to take charge and when not to
4.2	30–72	Remarriage, being unlucky, harems, (Note: According to Jyoti Puri, the Burton version of Kamasutra "appears to have borrowed material concerning the functioning of the harem in Damascus (Syria)" as he edited the text for his colonial era British audience in the late 19th-century.) polygamy
5		Other men's wives
5.1	1–56	Human nature, tendencies of men, tendencies of women, why women lose interest and start looking elsewhere, avoiding adultery, pursuing adultery, finding women interested in extramarital sex
5.2–5	1–28, 1–66, 1–37	Finding many lovers, deploying messengers, the need for them and how to find good go-betweens, getting acquainted, how to make a pass, gifts and love tokens, arranging meetings, how to discretely find out if a woman is available and interested, warnings and knowing when to stop
5.6	1–48	Public women [prostitution], their life, what to expect and not, how to find them, regional practices, guarding and respecting them
6		About courtesans
6.1	1–33	Courtesans, what motivates them, how to find clients, deciding if someone should just be a friend or a lover, which lovers to avoid, getting a lover and keeping him interested
6.2	1–76	How to please your lover
6.3	1–46	Making a lover go crazy about you, how to get rid of him if love life is not fulfilling
6.4–5	1–43, 1–39	Methods to make an ex-lover interested in you again, reuniting, methods, checking if it is worth the effort, types of lovers, things to consider
6.6	1–53	Why love life gets dull, examples, familiarity and doubts
7		Occult practices
7.1–2	1–51	Looking good, feeling good, why and how to be attractive, bewitching, being virile, paying attention, genuineness and artificiality, body art and perforations, taking care of one's sexual organs, stimulants, prescriptions and unusual practices

== Contents ==
On balance in life

In any period of life in which
one of the elements of the trivarga
– dharma, artha, kama –
is the primary one, the other two
should be natural adjuncts of it.
Under no circumstances, should any one of the
trivarga be detrimental to the other two.

— Kamasutra 1.2.1,
Translator: Ludo Rocher

The Kamasutra is a "sutra"-genre text consisting of intensely condensed, aphoristic verses. Doniger describes them as a "kind of atomic string (thread) of meanings", which are so cryptic that any translation is more like deciphering and filling in the text. Condensing a text into a sutra-genre religious text form makes it easier to remember and transmit, but it also introduces ambiguity and the need to understand the context of each chapter, its philological roots, as well as the prior literature, states Doniger. However, this method of knowledge preservation and transmission has its foundation in the Vedas, which themselves are cryptic and require a commentator and teacher-guide to comprehend the details and the inter-relationship of the ideas. The Kamasutra too has attracted commentaries, of which the most well known are those of 12th-century or 13th-century Yaśodhara's Jayamaṅgalā in the Sanskrit language, and of Devadatta Shastri who commented on the original text as well as its commentaries in the Hindi language. There are many other Sanskrit commentaries on the Kamasutra, such as the Sutra Vritti by Narsingha Sastri. These commentaries cite and quote Hindu texts such as the Upanishads, the Arthashastra, the Natyashastra, the Manusmriti, the Nyayasutra, the Markandeya Purana, the Mahabharata, the Nitishastra and others to provide the context, per the norms of its literary traditions. The extant translations of the Kamasutra typically incorporate these commentaries, states Daniélou.

In the colonial era marked by sexual censorship, the Kamasutra became famous as a pirated and underground text for its explicit description of sex positions. The stereotypical image of the text is one where erotic pursuit with sexual intercourse include improbable contortionist forms. In reality, according to Doniger, the real Kamasutra is much more and is a book about "the art of living", about understanding one's body and a partner's body, finding a partner and emotional connection, marriage, the power equation over time in intimate relationships, the nature of adultery and drugs (aphrodisiacs) along with many simple to complex variations in sex positions to explore. It is also a psychological treatise that presents the effect of desire and pleasure on human behavior.

For each aspect of Kama, the Kamasutra presents a diverse spectrum of options and regional practices. According to Shastri, as quoted by Doniger, the text analyses "the inclinations of men, good and bad", thereafter it presents Vatsyayana's recommendation and arguments of what one must avoid as well as what to not miss in experiencing and enjoying, with "acting only on the good". For example, the text discusses adultery but recommends a faithful spousal relationship. The approach of Kamasutra is not to ignore nor deny the psychology and complexity of human behavior for pleasure and sex. The text, according to Doniger, clearly states "that a treatise demands the inclusion of everything, good or bad", but after being informed with in-depth knowledge, one must "reflect and accept only the good". The approach found in the text is one where goals of science and religion should not be to repress, but to encyclopedically know and understand, thereafter let the individual decide. The text states that it aims to be comprehensive and inclusive of diverse views and lifestyles.

=== Flirting and courtship ===
The 3rd-century text includes a number of themes, including subjects such as flirting that resonate in the modern era context, states a New York Times review. For example, it suggests that a young man seeking to attract a woman, should hold a party, and invite the guests to recite poetry. In the party, a poem should be read with parts missing, and the guests should compete to creatively complete the poem. As another example, the Kamasutra suggests that the boy and the girl should go play together, such as swim in a river. The boy should dive into the water away from the girl he is interested in, then swim underwater to get close to her, emerge from the water and surprise her, touch her slightly and then dive again, away from her.

Book 3 of the Kamasutra is largely dedicated to the art of courtship with the aim of marriage. The book's opening verse declares marriage to be a conducive means to "a pure and natural love between the partners", states Upadhyaya. It leads to emotional fulfillment in many forms such as more friends for both, relatives, progeny, amorous and sexual relationship between the couple, and the conjugal pursuit of dharma (spiritual and ethical life) and artha (economic life). The first three chapters discuss how a man should go about finding the right bride, while the fourth offers equivalent discussion for a woman and how she can get the man she wants. The text states that a person should be realistic, and must possess the "same qualities which one expects from the partner". It suggests involving one's friends and relatives in the search, and meeting the current friends and relatives of one's future partner prior to the marriage. While the original text makes no mention of astrology and horoscopes, later commentaries, such as one by 13th-century Yashodhara includes consulting and comparing the compatibility of the horoscopes, omens, planetary alignments, and such signs prior to proposing a marriage. Vatsyayana recommends, states Alain Danielou, that "one should play, marry, associate with one's equals, people of one's own circle" who share the same values and religious outlook. It is more difficult to manage a good, happy relationship when there are basic differences between the two, according to verse 3.1.20 of the Kamasutra.

=== Intimacy and foreplay ===
Vatsyayana's Kamasutra describes intimacy of various forms, including those between lovers before and during sex. For example, the text discusses eight forms of alingana (embrace) in verses 2.2.7–23: sphrishtaka, viddhaka, udghrishtaka, piditaka, lataveshtitaka, vrikshadhirudha, tilatandula and kshiranira. The first four are expressive of mutual love, but are nonsexual. The last four are forms of embrace recommended by Vatsyayana to increase pleasure during foreplay and during sexual intimacy. Vatsyayana cites earlier – now lost – Indian texts from the Babhraya's school, for these eight categories of embraces. The various forms of intimacy reflect the intent and provide means to engage a combination of senses for pleasure. For instance, according to Vatsyayana the lalatika form enables both to feel each other and allows the man to visually appreciate "the full beauty of the female form", states S.C. Upadhyaya.

On sexual embraces

Some sexual embraces, not in this text,
also intensify passion;
these, too, may be used for love-making,
but only with care.
The territory of the text extends
only so far as men have dull appetites;
but when the wheel of sexual ecstasy is in full motion,
there is no textbook at all, and no order.

— Kamasutra 2.2.30–31,
Translator: Wendy Doniger and Sudhir Kakar

Another example of the forms of intimacy discussed in the Kamasutra includes chumbanas (kissing). The text presents twenty-six forms of kisses, ranging from those appropriate for showing respect and affection, to those during foreplay and sex. Vatsyayana also mentions variations in kissing cultures in different parts of ancient India. The best kiss for an intimate partner, according to kamasutra, is one that is based on the awareness of the avastha (the emotional state of one's partner) when the two are not in a sexual union. During sex, the text recommends going with the flow and mirroring with abhiyoga and samprayoga.

Other techniques of foreplay and sexual intimacy that are described in the kamasutra include; various forms of holding and embraces (grahana, upaguhana), mutual massage and rubbing (mardana), pinching and biting, using fingers and hands to stimulate (karikarakrida, nadi-kshobana, anguli-pravesha), three styles of jihva-pravesha (french kissing), and many styles of fellatio and cunnilingus.

=== Adultery ===
The Kamasutra, states the Indologist and Sanskrit literature scholar Ludo Rocher, discourages adultery but then devotes "not less than fifteen sutras (1.5.6–20) to enumerating the reasons (karana) for which a man is allowed to seduce a married woman". Vatsyayana mentions different types of nayikas (urban girls) such as unmarried virgins, those married and abandoned by husband, widow seeking remarriage and courtesans, then discusses their kama/sexual education, rights and mores. In childhood, Vātsyāyana says, a person should learn how to make a living; youth is the time for pleasure, and as years pass, one should concentrate on living virtuously and hope to escape the cycle of rebirth.

According to Doniger, the Kamasutra teaches adulterous sexual liaison as a means for a man to predispose the involved woman in assisting him, as a strategic means to work against his enemies and to facilitate his successes. It also explains the signs and reasons a woman wants to enter into an adulterous relationship and when she does not want to commit adultery. The Kamasutra teaches strategies to engage in adulterous relationships, but concludes its chapter on sexual liaison stating that one should not commit adultery because adultery pleases only one of two sides in a marriage, hurts the other, it goes against both dharma and artha.

=== Caste, class ===
The Kamasutra has been one of the unique sources of sociological information and cultural milieu of ancient India. It shows a "near total disregard of class (varna) and caste (jati)", states Doniger. Human relationships, including the sexual type, are neither segregated nor repressed by gender or caste, rather linked to individual's wealth (success in artha). In the Kamasutra, lovers are "not upper-class" but they "must be rich" enough to dress well, pursue social leisure activities, buy gifts and surprise the lover. In the rare mention of caste, it is about a man finding his legal wife and the advice that humorous stories to seduce a woman should be about "other virgins of same jati (caste)". In general, the text describes sexual activity between men and women across class and caste, both in urban and rural settings.

=== Same-sex relationships ===
The Kamasutra includes verses describing homosexual relations such as oral sex between two men, as well as between two women. Lesbian relations are extensively covered in Chapters 5 and 8 in Book 2. The text also mentions "pretend play", sadomasochism, and group sex.

According to Doniger, the Kamasutra discusses same-sex relationships through the notion of the tritiya prakriti, literally, "third sexuality" or "third nature". In Redeeming the Kamasutra, Doniger states that "the Kamasutra departs from the dharmic view of homosexuality in significant ways", where the term kliba appears. In contemporary translations, this has been inaccurately rendered as "eunuch" – or, a castrated man in a harem, and the royal harem did not exist in India before the Turkish presence in the ninth century. The Sanskrit word Kliba found in older Indian texts refers to a "man who does not act like a man", typically in a pejorative sense. The Kamasutra does not use the pejorative term kliba at all, but speaks instead of a "third nature" or, in the sexual behavior context as the "third sexuality".

The text states that there are two sorts of "third nature", one where a man behaves like a woman, and in the other, a woman behaves like a man. In one of the longest consecutive sets of verses describing a sexual act, the Kamasutra describes fellatio technique between a man dressed like a woman performing fellatio on another man. The text also mentions same-sex behavior between two women, such as a girl losing her virginity with a girlfriend as they use their fingers, as well as oral sex and the use of sex toys between women. Svairini, a term Danielou translates as a lesbian, is described in the text as a woman who lives a conjugal life with another woman or by herself fending for herself, not interested in a husband. Additionally, the text has some fleeting remarks on bisexual relationships.

== Translations ==
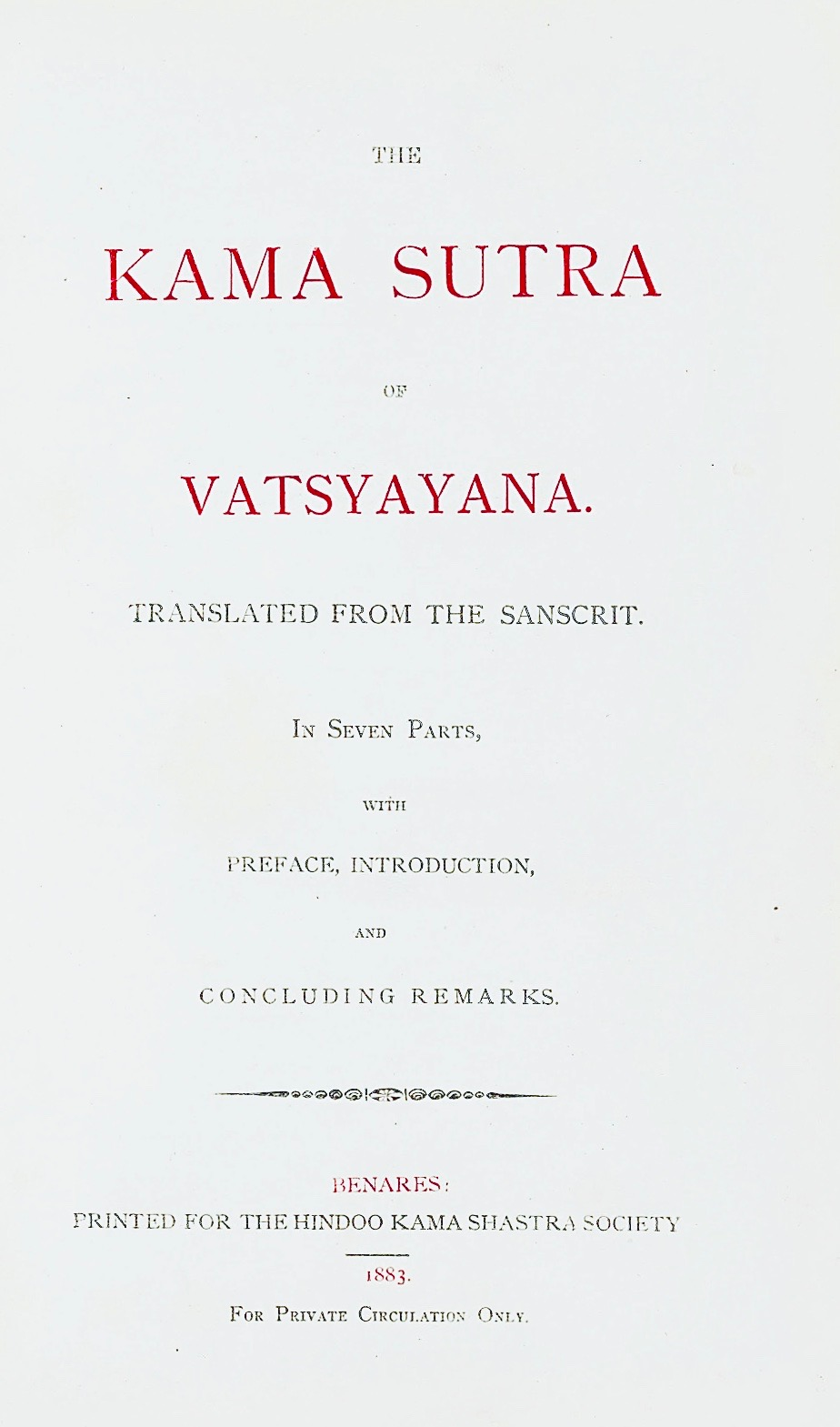
The first English version by Richard Burton became public in 1883, but it was illegal to publish it in England and the United States until 1962. Right: a French retranslation of 1891.

According to Doniger, the historical records suggest that the Kamasutra was a well-known and popular text in Indian history. This popularity through the Mughal Empire era is confirmed by its regional translations. The Mughals, states Doniger, had "commissioned lavishly illustrated Persian and Sanskrit Kamasutra manuscripts".

The first English translation of the Kama Sutra was privately printed in 1883 by the Orientalist Sir Richard Francis Burton. He did not translate it, but did edit it to suit the Victorian British attitudes. The unedited translation was produced by the Indian scholar Bhagwan Lal Indraji with the assistance of a student Shivaram Parshuram Bhide, under the guidance of Burton's friend, the Indian civil servant Forster Fitzgerald Arbuthnot. According to Doniger, the Burton version is a "flawed English translation" but influential as modern translators and abridged versions, even in the Indian languages such as in Hindi, are re-translations of the Burton version, rather than the original Sanskrit manuscript.

The Burton version of the Kamasutra was produced in an environment where the Victorian mindset and Protestant proselytizers were busy finding faults and attacking Hinduism and its culture, rejecting as "filthy paganism" anything they found sensuous and sexual in Hindu arts and literature. The "Hindus were cowering under their scorn", states Doniger, and the open discussion of sex in the Kamasutra scandalized the 19th-century Europeans. The Burton edition of the Kamasutra was illegal to publish in England and the United States till 1962. Yet, states Doniger, it became soon after its publication in 1883, "one of the most pirated books in the English language", widely copied, reprinted and republished sometimes without Richard Burton's name.

Burton made two important contributions to the Kamasutra. First, he had the courage to publish it in the colonial era against the political and cultural mores of the British elite. He creatively found a way to subvert the then prevalent censorship laws of Britain under the Obscene Publications Act of 1857. Burton created a fake publishing house named The Kama Shastra Society of London and Benares (Benares = Varanasi), with the declaration that it is "for private circulation only". The second major contribution was to edit it in a major way, by changing words and rewriting sections to make it more acceptable to the general British public. For example, the original Sanskrit Kamasutra does not use the words lingam or yoni for sexual organs, and almost always uses other terms. Burton adroitly avoided being viewed as obscene to the Victorian mindset by avoiding the use of words such as penis, vulva, vagina and other direct or indirect sexual terms in the Sanskrit text to discuss sex, sexual relationships and human sexual positions. Burton used the terms lingam and yoni instead throughout the translation. This conscious and incorrect word substitution, states Doniger, thus served as an Orientalist means to "anthropologize sex, distance it, make it safe for English readers by assuring them, or pretending to assure them, that the text was not about real sexual organs, their sexual organs, but merely about the appendages of weird, dark people far away." Though Burton used the terms lingam and yoni for human sexual organs, terms that actually mean a lot more in Sanskrit texts and its meaning depends on the context. However, Burton's Kamasutra gave a unique, specific meaning to these words in the western imagination.

The problems with Burton mistranslation are many, states Doniger. First, the text "simply does not say what Burton says it says". Second, it "robs women of their voices, turning direct quotes into indirect quotes, thus losing the force of the dialogue that animates the work and erasing the vivid presence of the many women who speak in the Kamasutra". Third, it changes the force of words in the original text. For example, when a woman says "Stop!" or "Let me go!" in the original text of Vatsyayana, Burton changed it to "She continually utters words expressive of prohibition, sufficiency, or desire of liberation", states Doniger, and thus misconstrues the context and intent of the original text. Similarly, while the original Kamasutra acknowledges that "women have strong privileges", Burton erased these passages and thus eroded women's agency in ancient India in the typical Orientialist manner that dehumanized the Indian culture. David Shulman, a professor of Indian Studies and Comparative Religion, agrees with Doniger that the Burton translation is misguided and flawed. The Burton version was written with a different mindset, one that treated "sexual matters with Victorian squeamishness and a pornographic delight in the indirect", according to Shulman. It has led to a misunderstanding of the text and created the wrong impression of it being ancient "Hindu pornography".

In 1961, S. C. Upadhyaya published his translation as the Kamasutra of Vatsyayana: Complete Translation from the Original. According to Jyoti Puri, it is considered among the best-known scholarly English-language translations of the Kamasutra in post-independent India.

Other translations include those by Alain Daniélou (The Complete Kama Sutra in 1994). This translation, originally into French, and thence into English, featured the original text attributed to Vatsyayana, along with a medieval and a modern commentary. Unlike the 1883 version, Daniélou's new translation preserves the numbered verse divisions of the original, and does not incorporate notes in the text. He includes English translations of two important commentaries, one by Jayamangala, and a more modern commentary by Devadatta Shastri, as endnotes. Doniger questions the accuracy of Daniélou's translation, stating that he has freely reinterpreted the Kamasutra while disregarding the gender that is implicit in the Sanskrit words. He, at times, reverses the object and subject, making the woman the subject and man the object when the Kamasutra is explicitly stating the reverse. According to Doniger, "even this cryptic text [Kamasutra] is not infinitely elastic" and such creative reinterpretations do not reflect the text.

A translation by Indra Sinha was published in 1980. In the early 1990s, its chapter on sexual positions began circulating on the Internet as an independent text and today is often assumed to be the whole of the Kama Sutra.

Doniger and Sudhir Kakar published another translation in 2002, as a part of the Oxford World's Classics series. Along with the translation, Doniger has published numerous articles and book chapters relating to the Kamasutra. The Doniger translation and Kamasutra-related literature has both been praised and criticized. According to David Shulman, the Doniger translation "will change peoples' understanding of this book and of ancient India. Previous translations are hopelessly outdated, inadequate and misguided". Narasingha Sil calls the Doniger's work as "another signature work of translation and exegesis of the much misunderstood and abused Hindu erotology". Her translation has the folksy, "twinkle prose", engaging style, and an original translation of the Sanskrit text. However, adds Sil, Doniger's work mixes her postmodern translation and interpretation of the text with her own "political and polemical" views. She makes sweeping generalizations and flippant insertions that are supported by neither the original text nor the weight of evidence in other related ancient and later Indian literature such as from the Bengal Renaissance movement – one of the scholarly specialty of Narasingha Sil. Doniger's presentation style titillates, yet some details misinform and parts of her interpretations are dubious, states Sil.

== Analysis ==
Indira Kapoor, a director of the International Planned Parenthood Foundation, states that the Kamasutra is a treatise on human sexual behavior and an ancient attempt to seriously study sexuality among other things. According to Kapoor, quotes Jyoti Puri, the attitude of contemporary Indians is markedly different, with misconceptions and expressions of embarrassment, rather than curiosity and pride, when faced with texts such as Kamasutra and amorous and erotic arts found in Hindu temples. Kamasutra, states Kapoor, must be viewed as a means to discover and improve the "self-confidence and understanding of their bodies and feelings".

The Kamasutra has been a popular reference to erotic ancient literature. In the Western media, such as in the American women's magazine Redbook, the Kamasutra is described as "Although it was written centuries ago, there's still no better sex handbook, which details hundreds of positions, each offering a subtle variation in pleasure to men and women."

Jyoti Puri, who published a review and feminist critique of the text, stated that the "Kamasutra is frequently appropriated as indisputable evidence of a non-Western and tolerant, indeed celebratory, view of sexuality" and for "the belief that the Kamasutra provides a transparent glimpse into the positive, even exalted, view of sexuality". However, according to Puri, this is a colonial and anticolonial modernist interpretation of the text. These narratives neither resonate with nor provide the "politics of gender, race, nationality and class" that may have been prevalent in ancient India as published by other historians.

Doniger takes Vatsyayana as the only one who can inspire contemporary Indians to overcome "self-doubts and rejoice" in the Kama Sutra as a "great cultural masterpiece".

== In popular culture ==
List of feature films based on the Kama Sutra:

- Kama Sutra: A Tale of Love
- Kamasutra 3D
- Tales of The Kama Sutra: The Perfumed Garden
- Tales of The Kama Sutra 2: Monsoon

== Illustrations based on the Kama Sutra ==
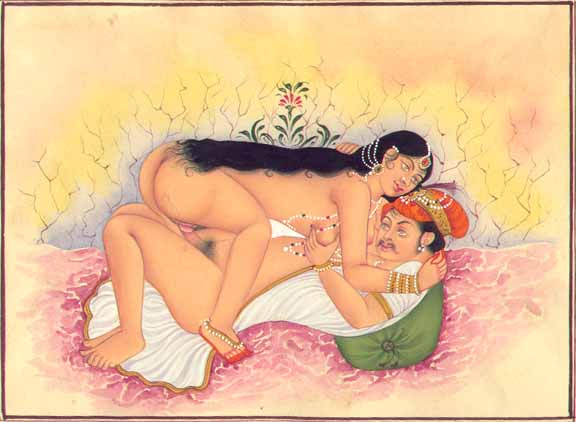
Kama Sutra illustration of woman on top, circa 19th century

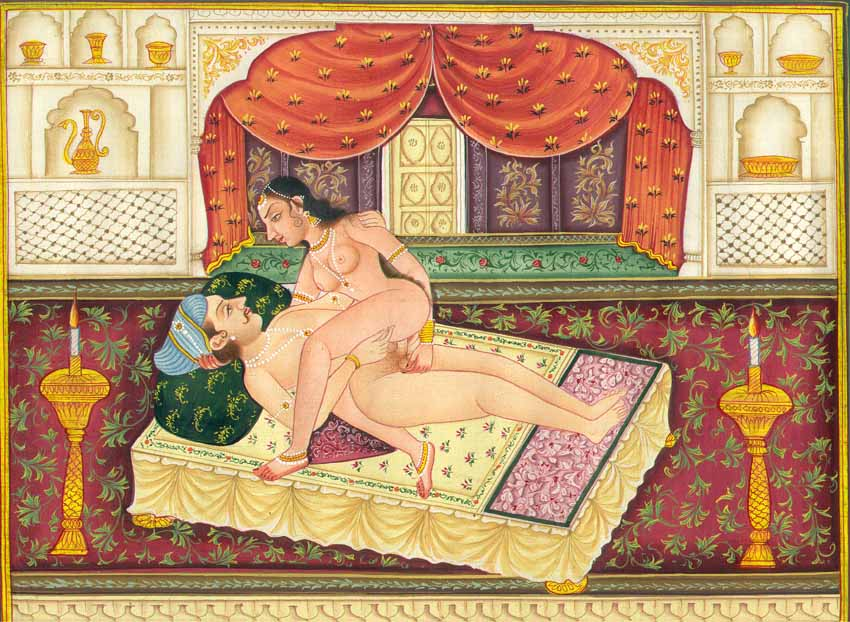
Kama Sutra illustration, circa 19th century

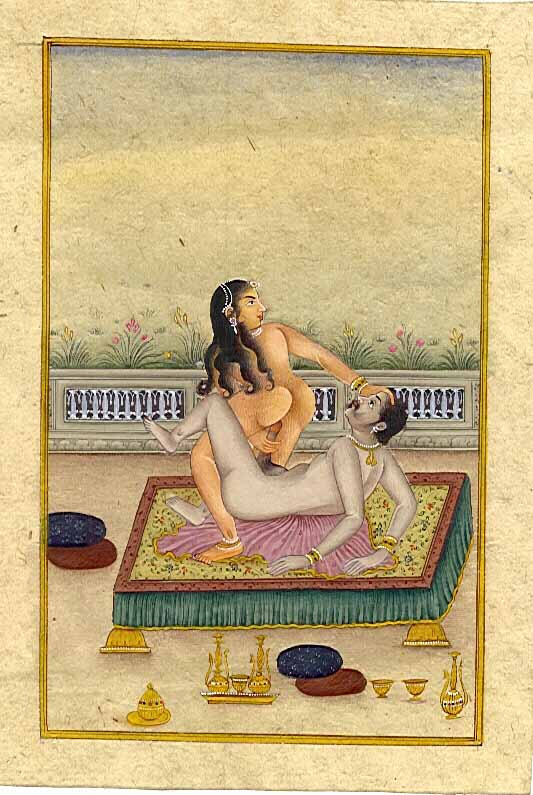
Kama Sutra illustration, circa 19th century

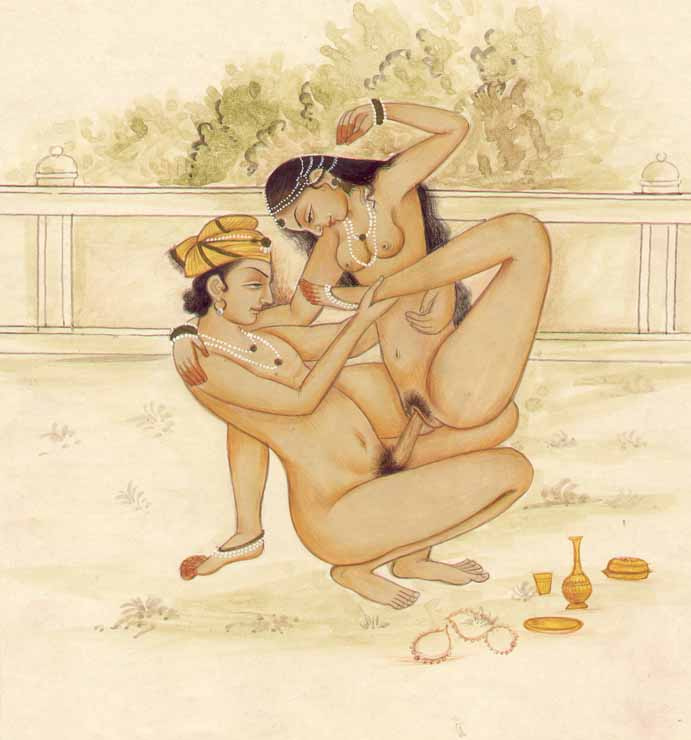
Kama Sutra illustration, circa 19th century

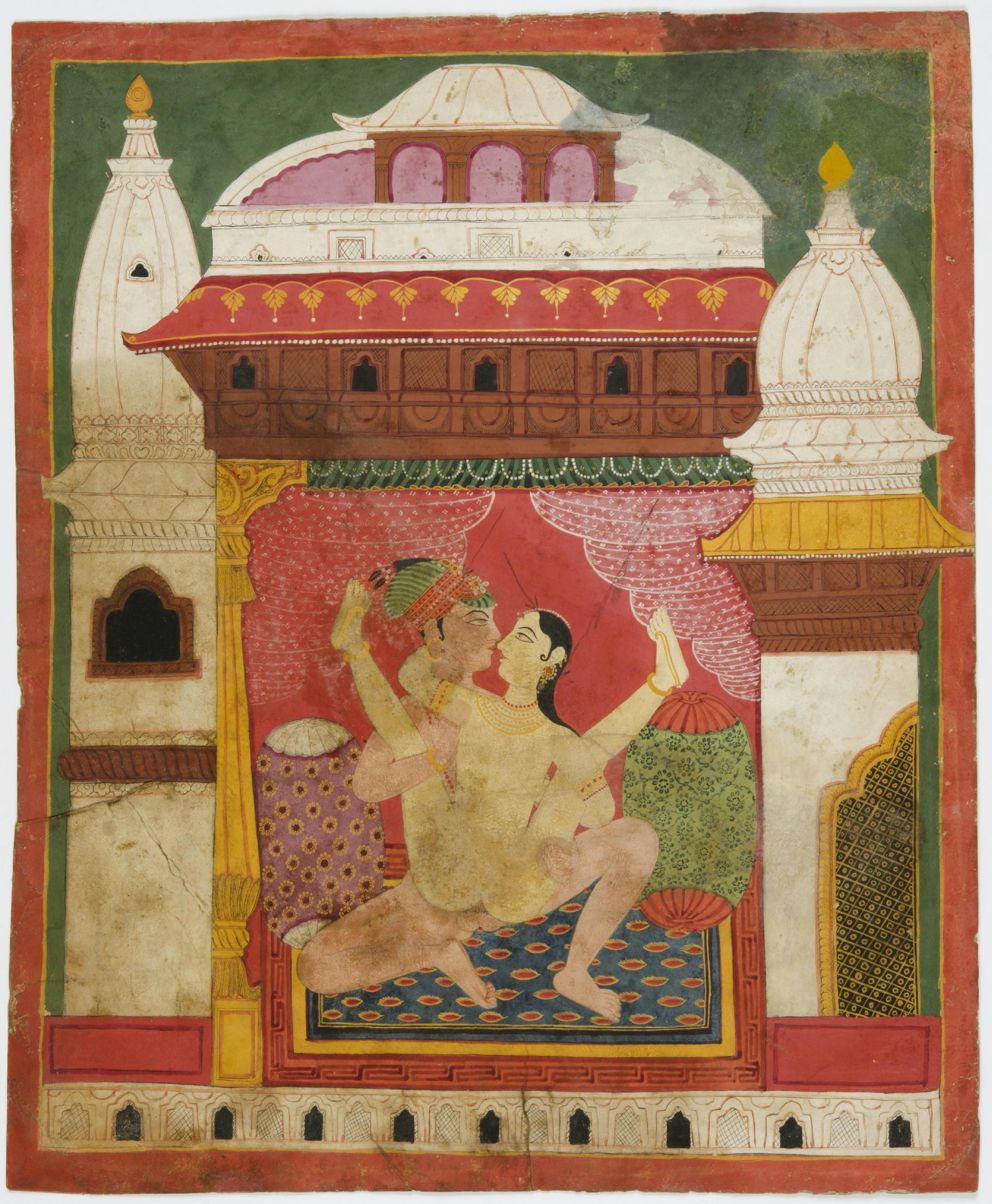
Kama Sutra illustration, late 18th century

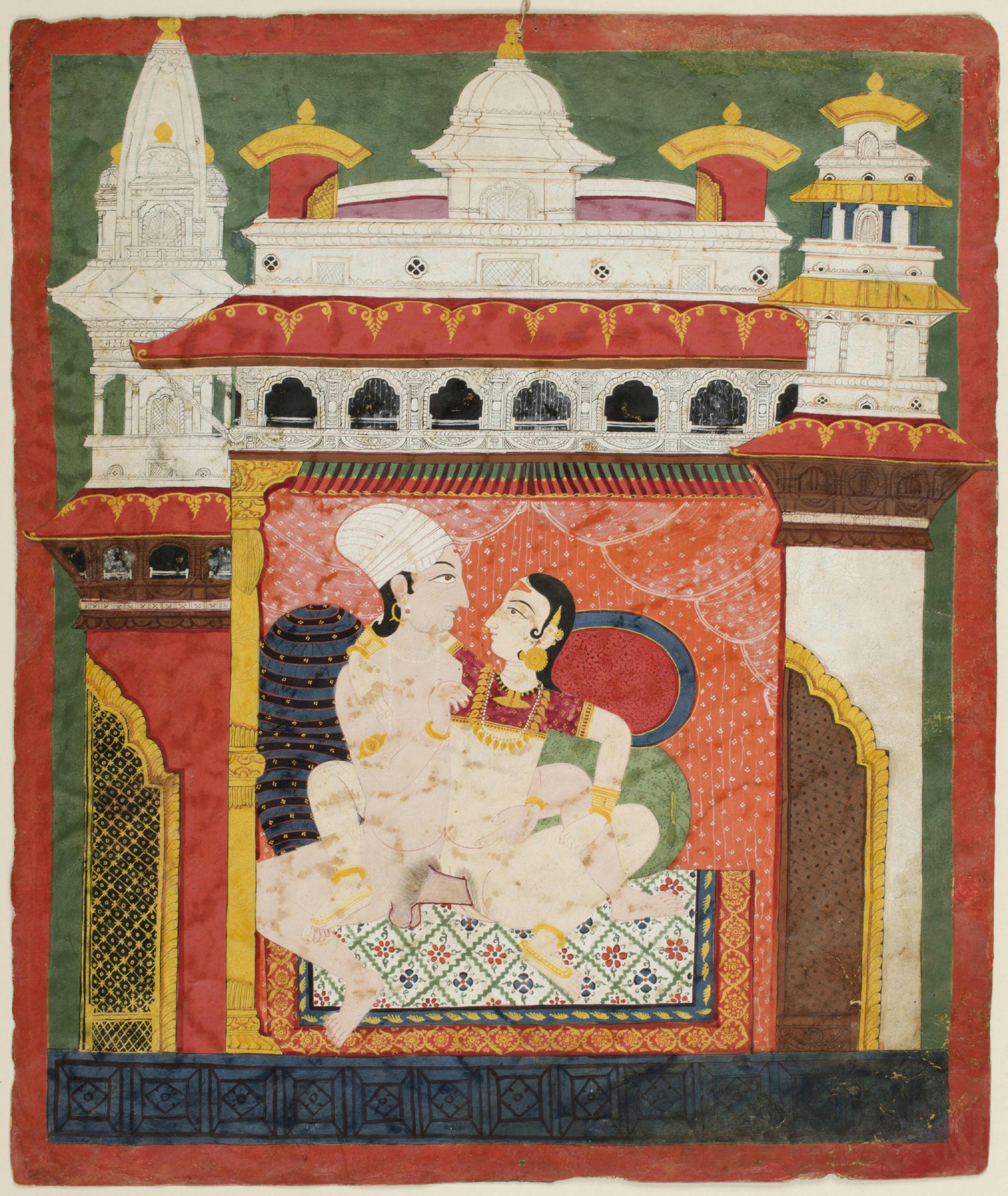
Kama Sutra illustration, late 18th century

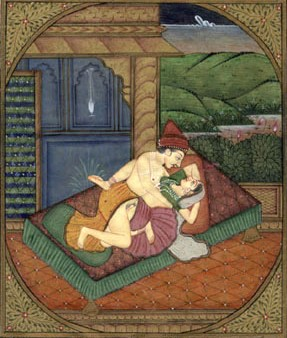
Kama Sutra illustration of missionary position, circa 19th century

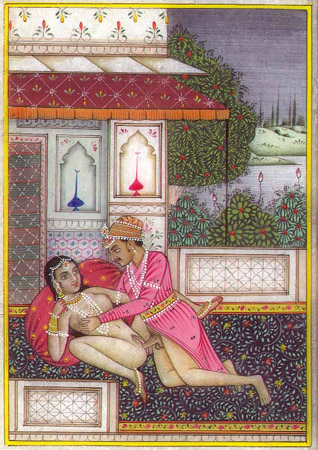
Kama Sutra illustration, circa 19th century

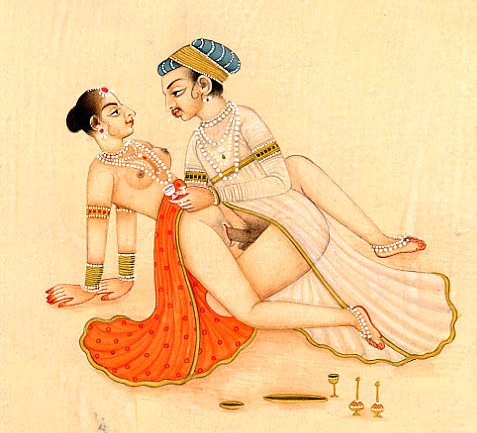
Kama Sutra illustration, circa 19th century

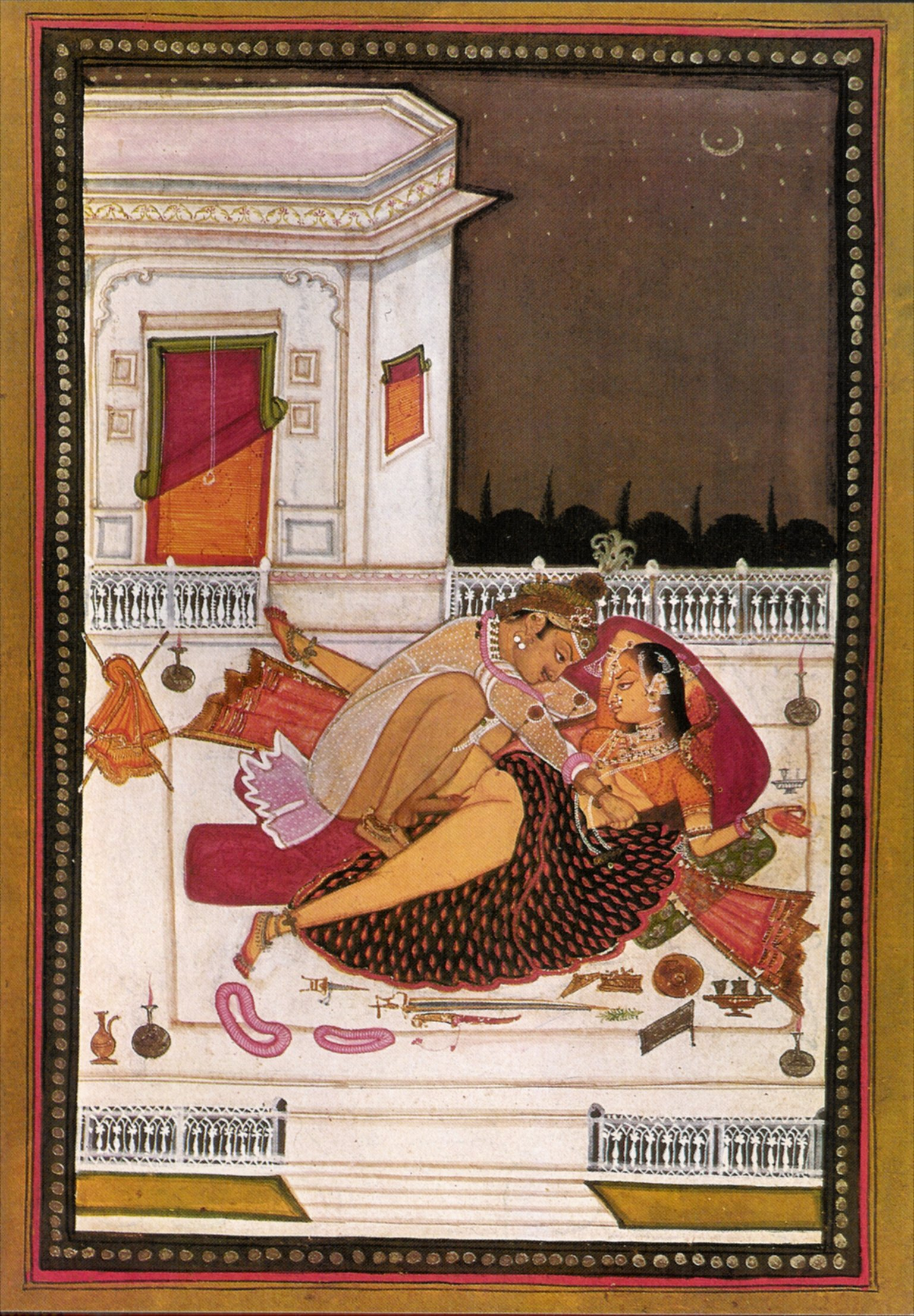
Kama Sutra illustration, 1790

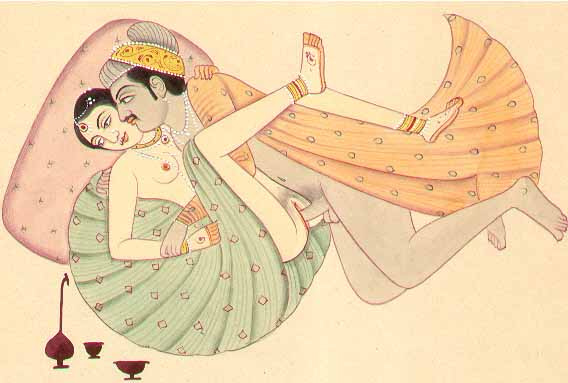
Kama Sutra illustration, circa 19th century

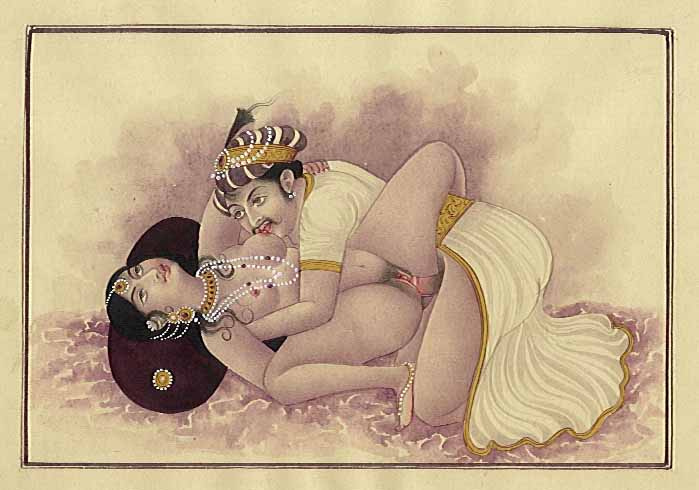
Kama Sutra illustration, circa 19th century

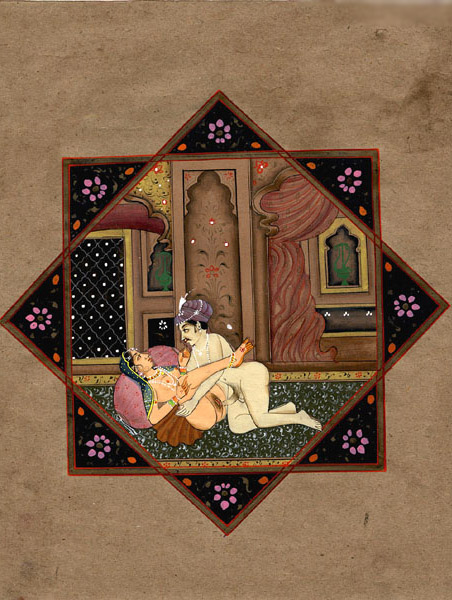
Kama Sutra illustration, circa 19th century

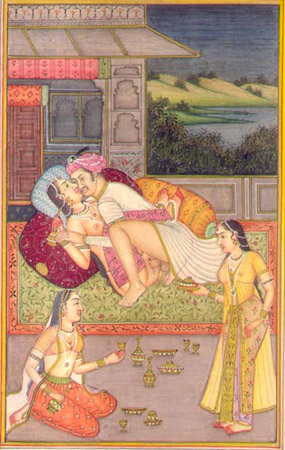
Kama Sutra illustration, circa 19th century

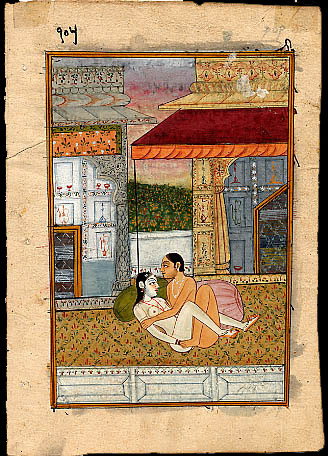
Kama Sutra illustration, circa 19th century

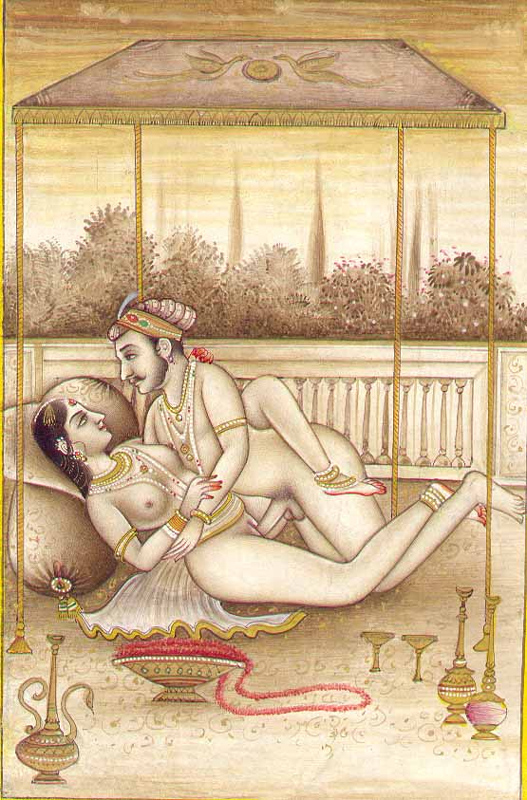
Kama Sutra illustration, circa 19th century

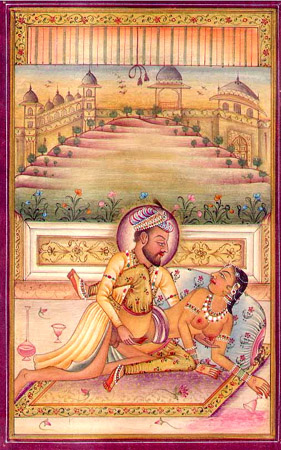
Kama Sutra illustration, circa 19th century

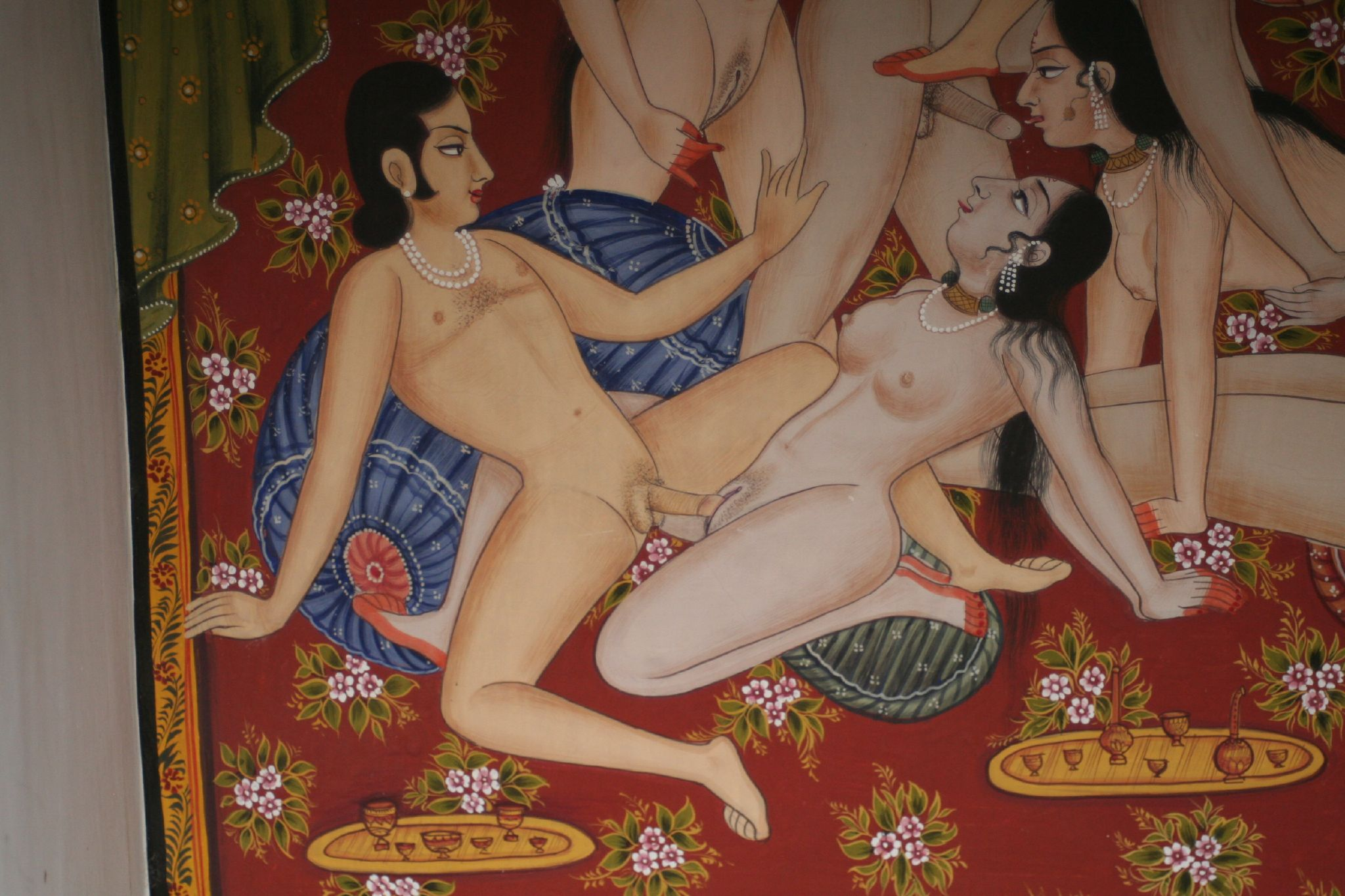
Kama Sutra illustration of group sex

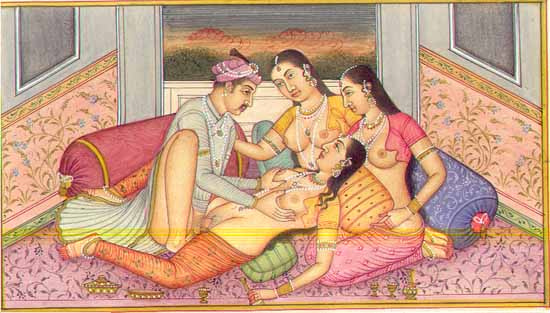
Kama Sutra illustration, circa 19th century

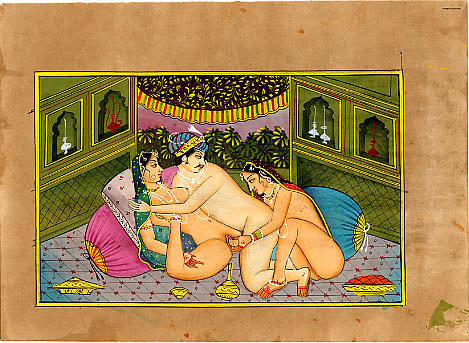
Kama Sutra illustration, circa 19th century

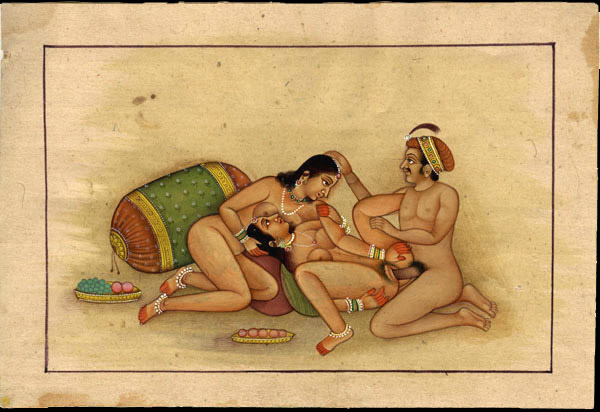
Kama Sutra illustration, circa 19th century

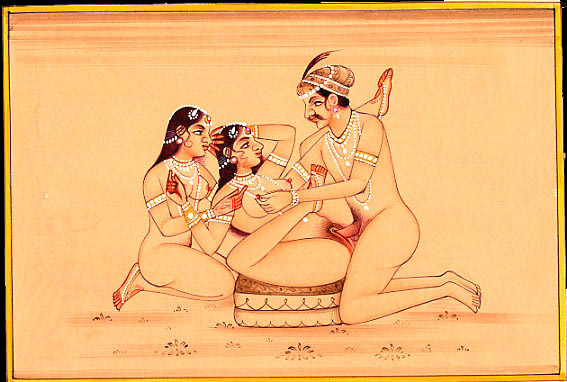
Kama Sutra illustration, circa 19th century

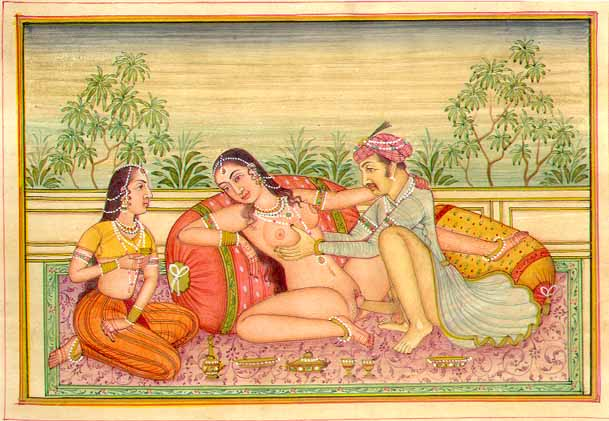
Kama Sutra illustration, circa 19th century

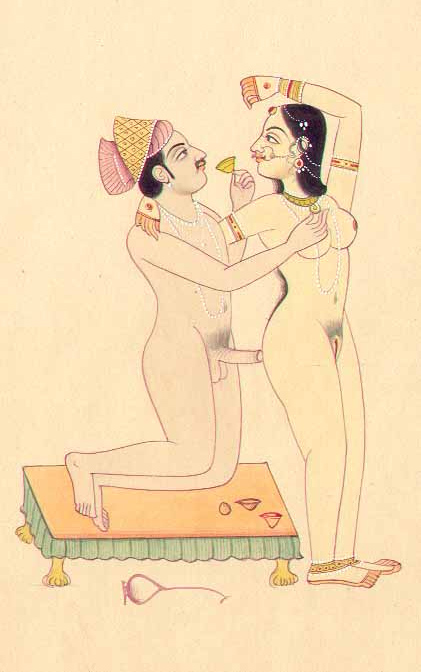
Kama Sutra illustration of standing positions, circa 19th century

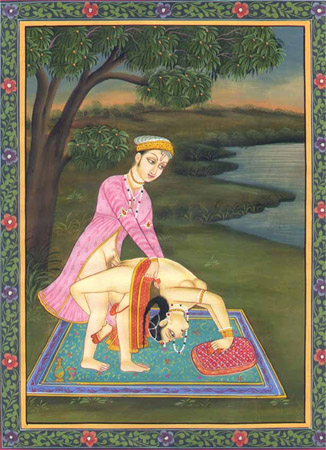
Kama Sutra illustration, circa 19th century

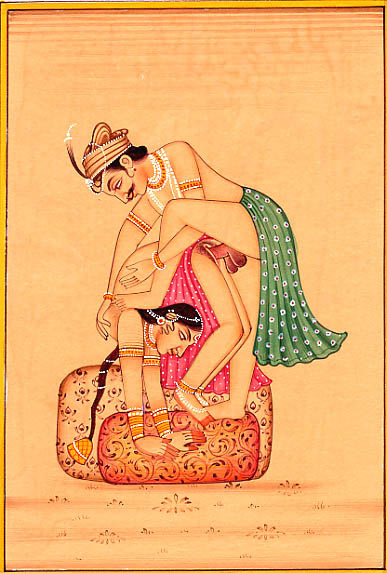
Kama Sutra illustration, circa 19th century

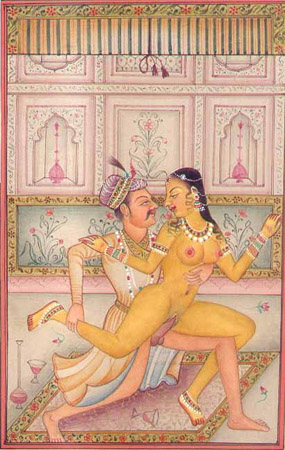
Kama Sutra illustration, circa 19th century

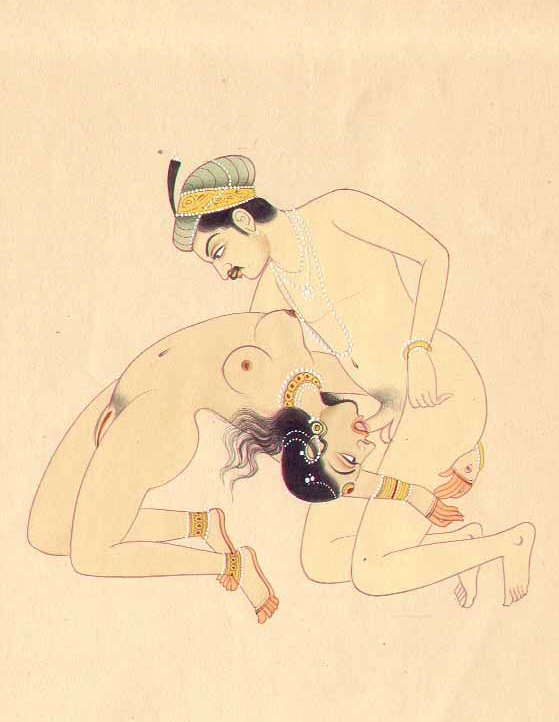
Kama Sutra illustration, circa 19th century

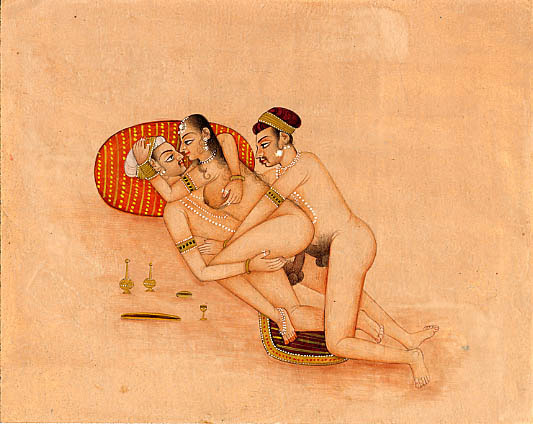
Kama Sutra illustration of double penetration, circa 19th century

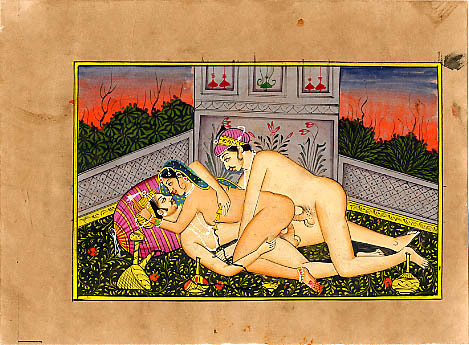
Kama Sutra illustration, circa 19th century

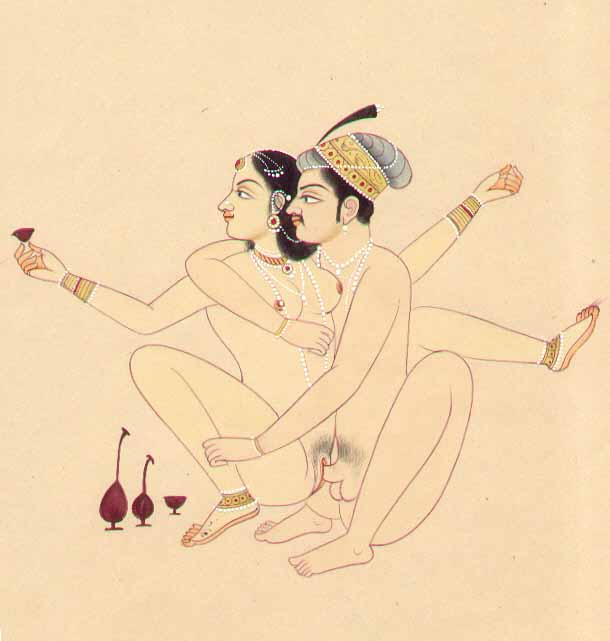
Kama Sutra illustration of lotus position, circa 19th century

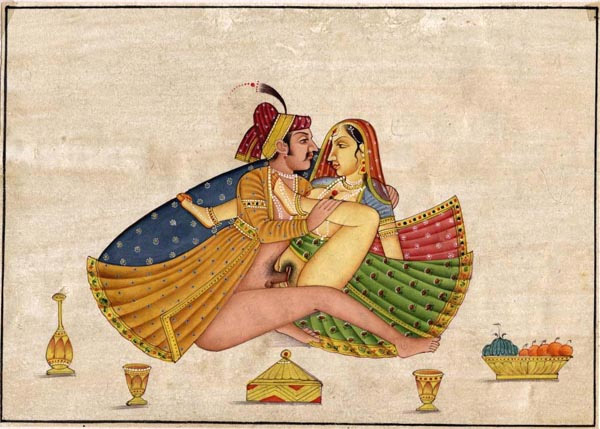
Kama Sutra illustration, circa 19th century

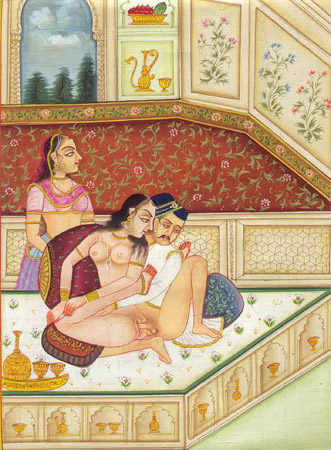
Kama Sutra illustration, circa 19th century

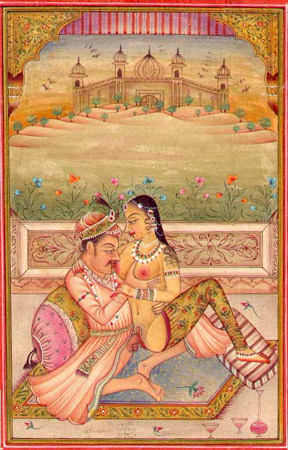
Kama Sutra illustration, circa 19th century

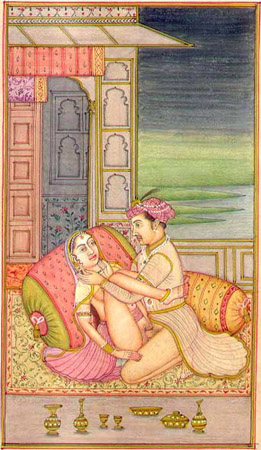
Kama Sutra illustration, circa 19th century

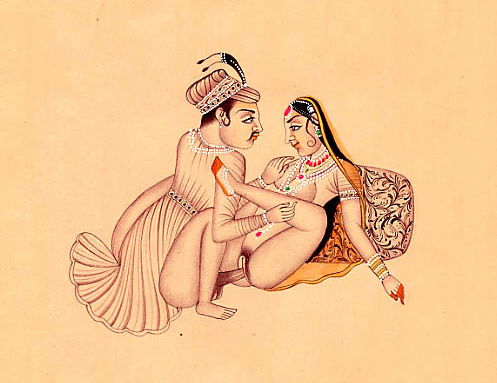
Kama Sutra illustration, circa 19th century

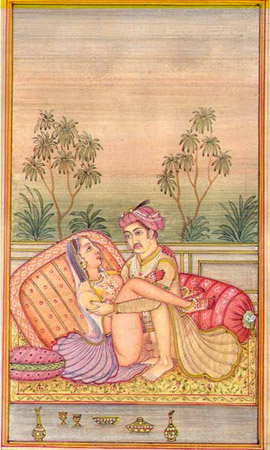
Kama Sutra illustration, circa 19th century

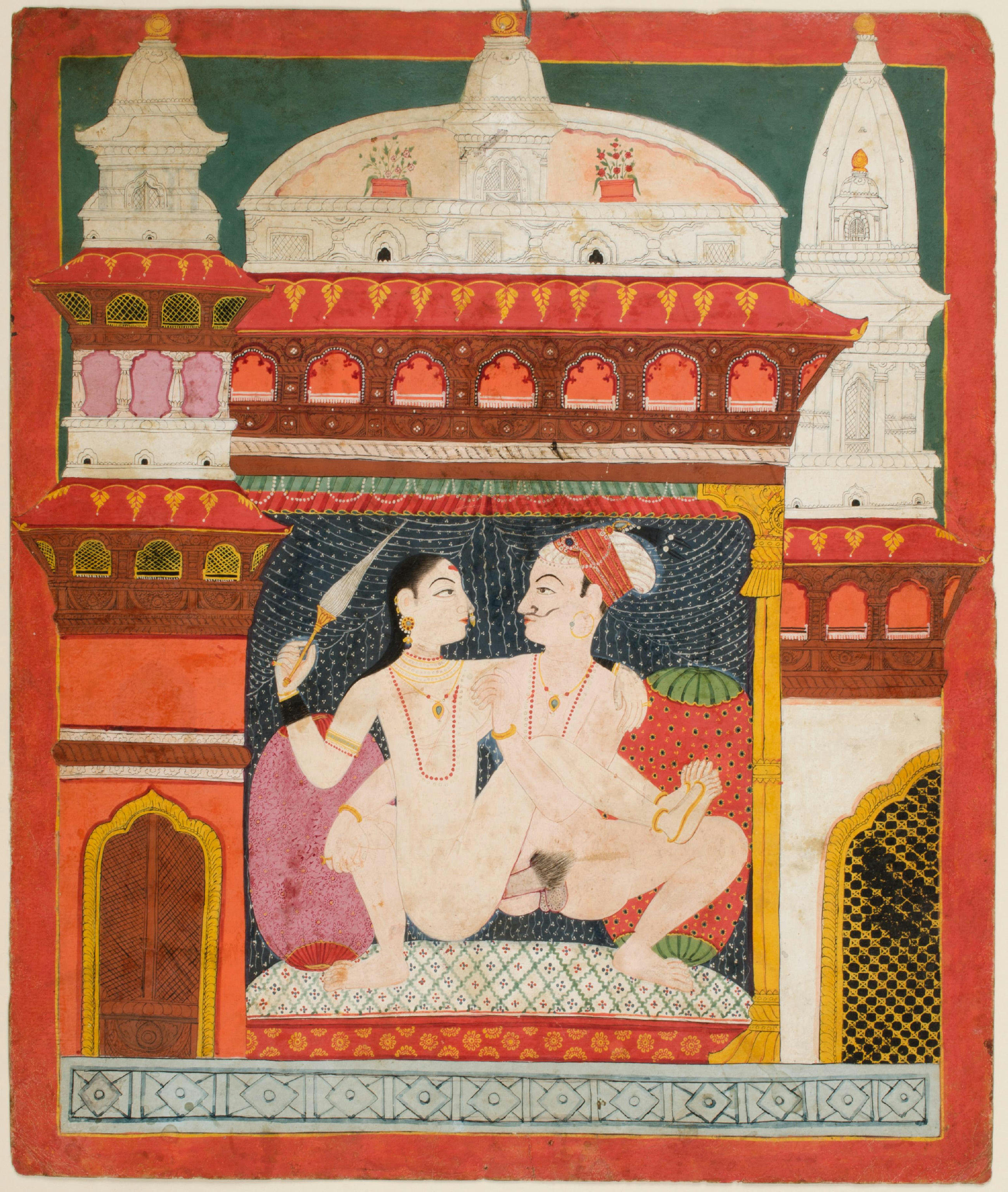
Kama Sutra illustration, late 18th century

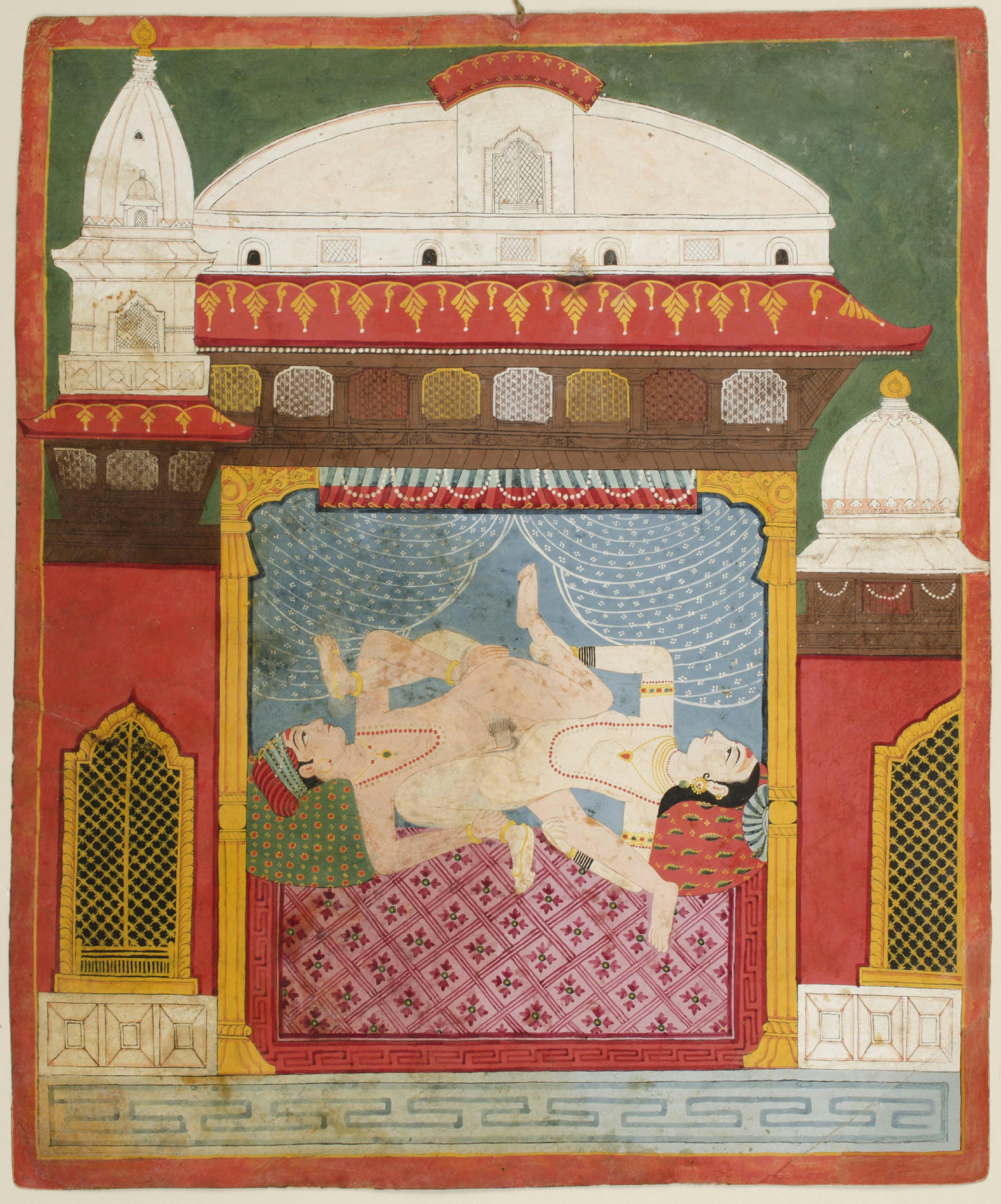
Kama Sutra illustration, late 18th century

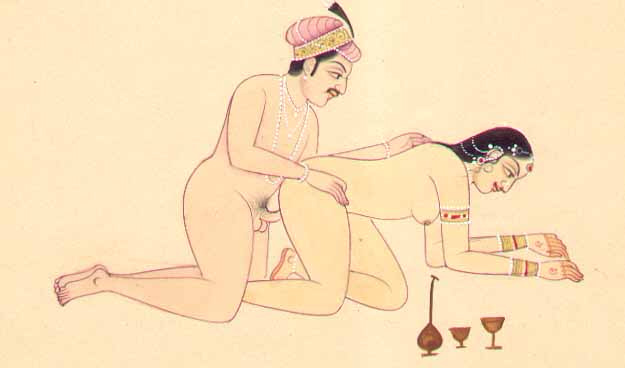
Kama Sutra illustration of doggy style, circa 19th century

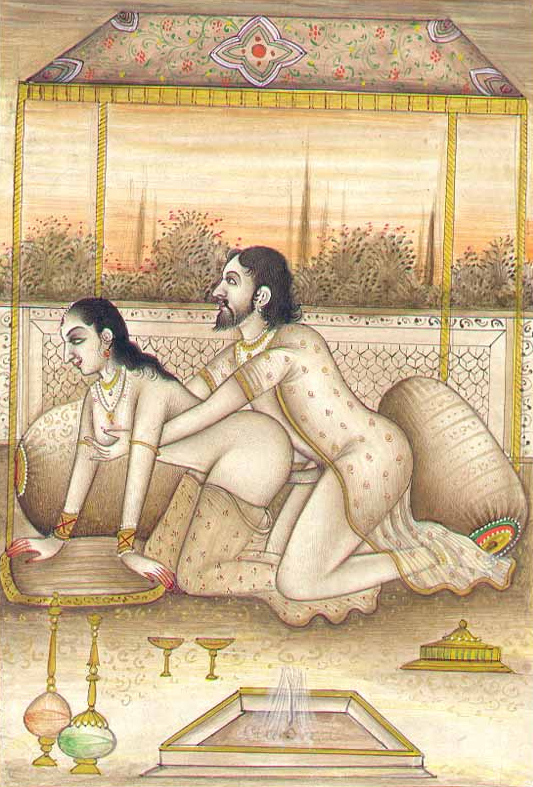
Kama Sutra illustration, circa 19th century

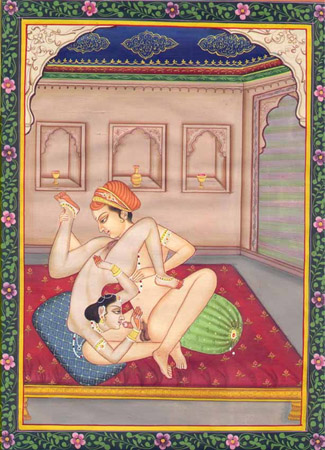
Kama Sutra illustration of 69, circa 19th century

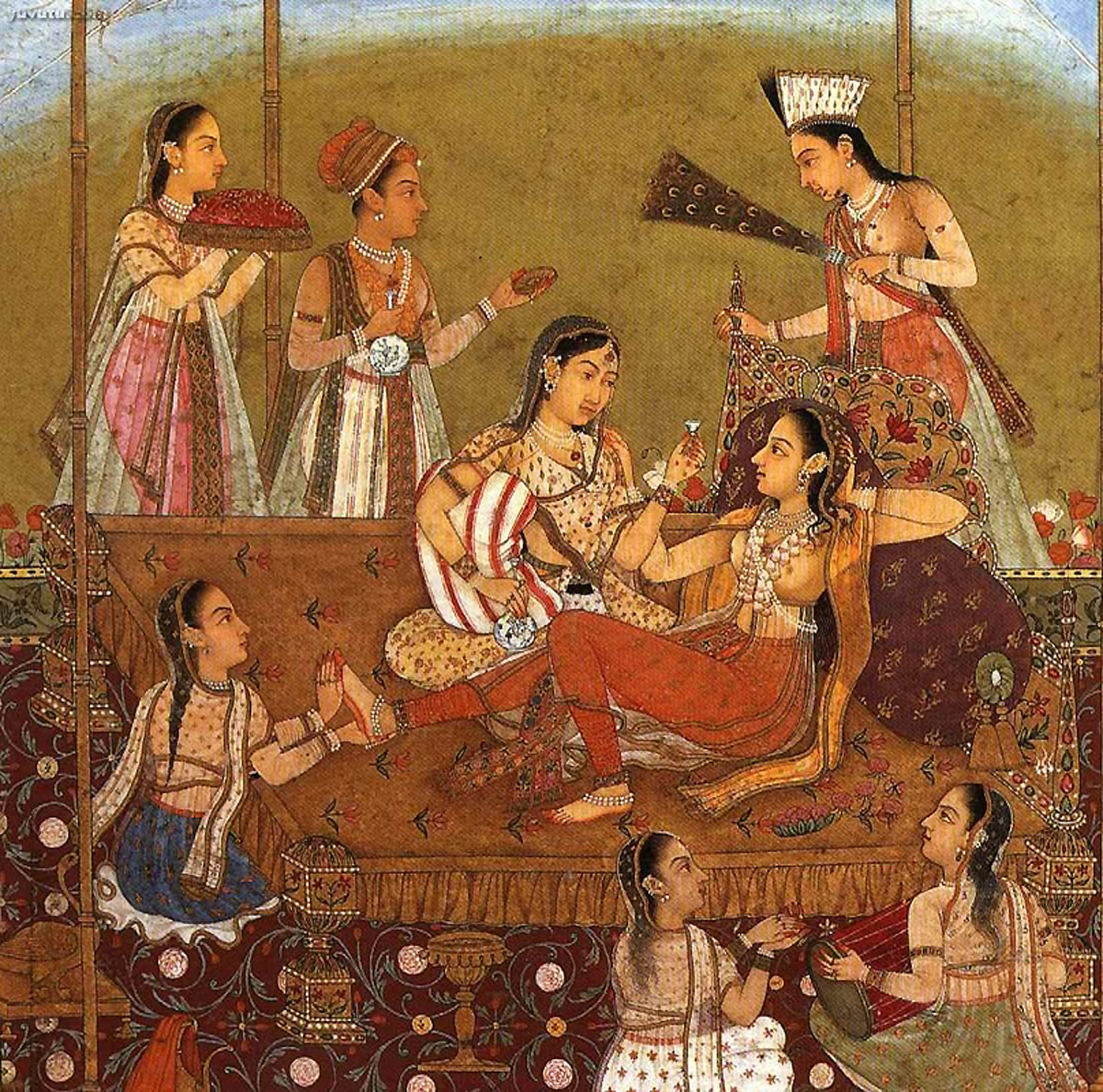
Kama Sutra illustration of lesbians

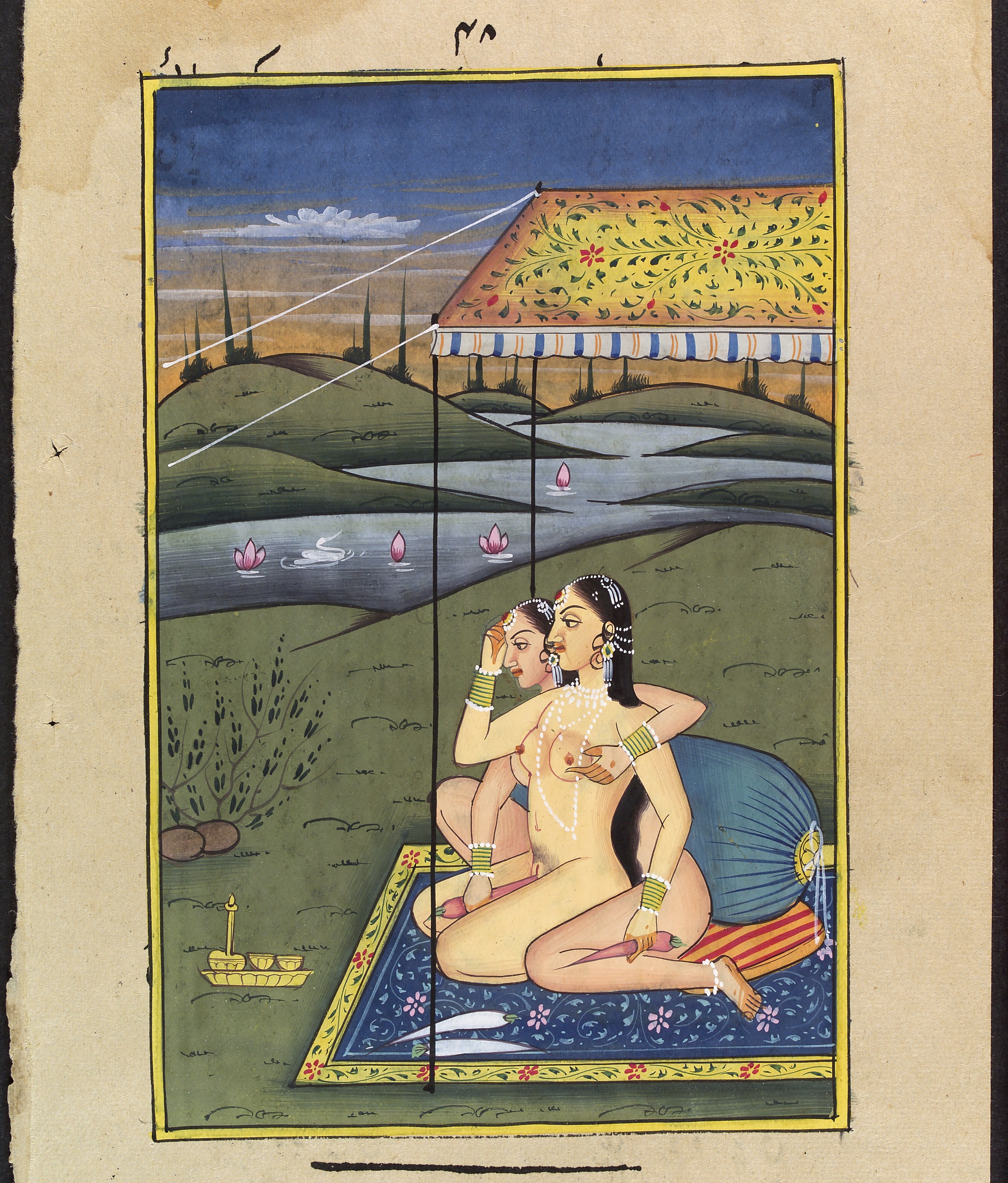
Kama Sutra illustration of women in embrace

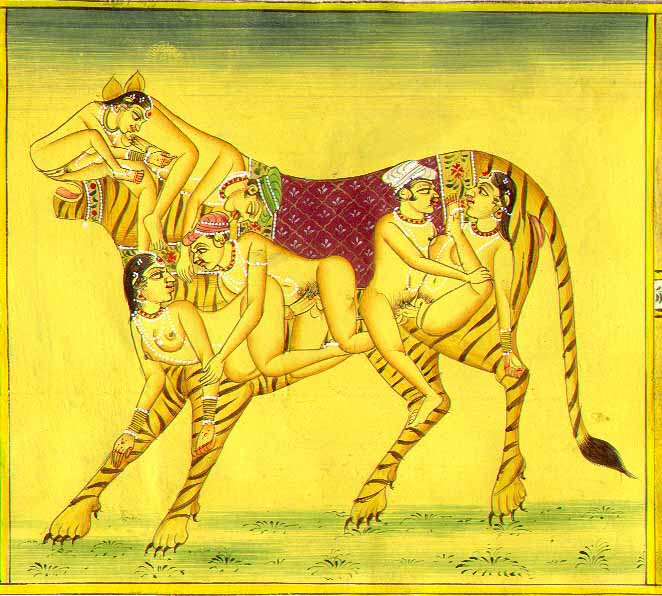
Kama Sutra Illustration

== See also ==
- History of sex in India
- The Jewel in The Lotus
- Kamashastra
- Khajuraho Group of Monuments
- Lazzat Un Nisa
- List of Indian inventions and discoveries
- Mlecchita vikalpa
- Philaenis
- The Perfumed Garden
- Song of Songs
- Fanny Hill

== General bibliography ==
- Apte, Vaman Shivram (1965). The Practical Sanskrit Dictionary (fourth revised & enlarged ed.). Delhi: Motilal Banarsidass Publishers. ISBN 81-208-0567-4.
- Avari, Burjor (2007). India: The Ancient Past. London: Routledge. ISBN 978-0-415-35616-9.
- Daniélou, Alain (1993). The Complete Kama Sutra: The First Unabridged Modern Translation of the Classic Indian Text. Inner Traditions. ISBN 0-89281-525-6.
- Wendy Doniger; Sudhir Kakar (2002). Kamasutra. Oxford World's Classics. Oxford University Press. ISBN 0-19-283982-9.
- Haksar, A.N.D; Favre, Malika (2011). Kama Sutra. Penguin. ISBN 978-1-101-65107-0.
- Flood, Gavin (1996). An Introduction to Hinduism. Cambridge: Cambridge University Press. ISBN 0-521-43878-0.
- Flood, Gavin, ed. (2003). The Blackwell Companion to Hinduism. Malden, MA: Blackwell Publishing Ltd. ISBN 1-4051-3251-5.
- Hopkins, Thomas J. (1971). The Hindu Religious Tradition. Cambridge: Dickenson Publishing Company, Inc.
- Keay, John (2000). India: A History. New York: Grove Press. ISBN 0-8021-3797-0.
- McConnachie, James (2007). The Book of Love: In Search of the Kamasutra. London: Atlantic Books. ISBN 978-1-84354-373-2.
- Jyoti Puri (2002). "Concerning "Kamasutras": Challenging Narratives of History and Sexuality". Signs. 27 (3). University of Chicago Press. JSTOR 3175887.
- Sinha, Indra (1999). The Cybergypsies. New York: Viking. ISBN 0-600-34158-5.
