= Kama Sutra: A Tale of Love =

1996 historical erotic romance film by Mira Nair

- Theatrical release poster
- Directed by: Mira Nair
- Screenplay by: Mira Nair
- Story by: Helena Kriel; Mira Nair
- Based on: "Utran" by Wajida Tabassum
- Produced by: Caroline Baron; Lydia Dean Pilcher; Mira Nair
- Starring: Naveen Andrews; Sarita Choudhury; Ramon Tikaram; Rekha; Indira Varma
- Cinematography: Declan Quinn
- Edited by: Kristina Boden
- Music by: Mychael Danna
- Production companies: NDF International; Pony Canyon; Pandora Filmproduktion; Channel Four Films; Mirabai Films
- Distributed by: Trimark Pictures
- Release dates: 11 September 1996 (Toronto International Film Festival); 28 February 1997 (United States)
- Running time: 117 minutes
- Countries: India; United Kingdom; Germany; Japan
- Language: English
- Budget: $3 million
- Box office: $8.6 million

Kama Sutra: A Tale of Love is a 1996 historical erotic romance film co-written, co-produced, and directed by Mira Nair. The first portion of the film is based on "Utran" ("Hand Me Downs"), a short story in Urdu by the Indian writer Wajida Tabassum. The film takes its title from the ancient Hindu text, the Kama Sutra but has no relationship with the text. It stars Naveen Andrews, Sarita Choudhury, Ramon Tikaram, Rekha and Indira Varma. The English-language film was produced by Indian, British, German and Japanese studios.

Declan Quinn won the 1998 Independent Spirit Award for Best Cinematography for his work in the film. Kama Sutra was nominated for the Golden Seashell award at the 1996 San Sebastián International Film Festival and was screened at the Cannes Film Festival. The film generated controversy at the time of its release and was banned in India due to its erotic theme and sexual content.

== Plot ==
In 16th-century India, Tara is a princess while Maya is her beautiful servant. They are best friends, but there is an undercurrent of jealousy and resentment, symbolised by the fact that Maya is given Tara's hand-me-down clothes and never anything new to wear. As the girls approach marriageable age, Tara resents that Maya is a better classical dancer than she is and that her parents and hunchback brother, Prince Bikram (a.k.a "Biki") show affection for her servant.

Tara is prepared to marry Prince Raj Singh, but when the prince comes to view his future wife, he is instantly infatuated with Maya instead. Noticing this, Tara spits in Maya's face and sends her from the wedding in tears. Maya takes revenge by seeking out Raj and having sex with him, before he has completed the marriage rites with Tara; Biki, hiding, watches the two of them.

As Tara is leaving home as a newlywed, Maya tells her that just as Maya wore the princess's used clothes all her life, Tara will now have something Maya has used. During her wedding night, Tara is hesitant to consummate their relationship. An angry Raj rapes his horrified bride, even calling her Maya, setting a tone of violence and humiliation for the marriage. Despite this, Tara still yearns for a loving relationship with her indifferent husband.

To save Maya's honour, Biki sends her a marriage proposal. When she refuses, he publicly brands her as a whore, and she is forced to leave her home. Wandering on her own, she meets a young stone sculptor, Jai Kumar, who works for Raj. He reveals that Maya has been the inspiration for his beautiful and highly erotic statues. Jai takes her to an older woman named Rasa Devi, who is a teacher of the Kama Sutra. Maya begins an intense romantic and sexual relationship with Jai that is abruptly halted when he fears he might not be able to work properly with Maya consuming his thoughts. Maya finds comfort with Rasa Devi and decides to learn the courtesan's art.

Raj, now the king, recognises Maya in one of Jai's sculptures. He dispatches his attendants to find Maya; she is delivered to the king as his new courtesan. Soon after, Raj and Jai have a wrestling competition, which Jai wins. Jai receives the king's favour but is warned that there will be dire consequences if he defeats the king again. Jai then learns of Maya's new status as the favoured concubine. Jai understands that his king is a dangerous man and he must keep his former relationship with Maya a secret.

In the meantime, the threat of an invading shah inches closer. Raj becomes increasingly irresponsible, descending into opium addiction and sexual debauchery. After he insults Biki, Biki writes a letter to the shah to rid the kingdom of Raj, who now taxes the poor for his own perverted pleasure. Jai and Maya rekindle their passion and the two begin meeting in secret. As tensions between Jai and Raj grow, Maya and Jai exchange wedding vows in private. Raj later catches the two lovers together and sentences Jai to death.

After finding Tara in the midst of a suicide attempt, Maya reconciles with her childhood friend. Maya then teaches Tara how to seduce the king, while Tara promises to help Maya escape to visit Jai. However, when Tara goes to her husband, he recognises Maya's style of seduction and again tries to humiliate his wife. Tara tells Raj that she doesn't even love him enough to hate him and leaves. Maya visits Jai one last time. Telling Jai she is his forever, Maya hacks off her long hair, symbolising that she will be his widow. Maya then tries her best to persuade Raj to free Jai by promising him her total surrender, but Raj rejects her plea.

Just before the execution, a box arrives from the shah, holding the severed head of Raj's brother, the grand vizier. Jai is executed by elephant while Maya watches from the crowd. As soldiers of the invading Shah take the king's palace, Maya walks away into the distance.

== Cast ==
- Indira Varma as Maya
- Sarita Choudhury as Tara, The Princess
- Naveen Andrews as Raj Singh
- Ramon Tikaram as Jai Kumar
- Avijit Dutt as Vazir, The King's Prime Minister
- Rekha as Rasa Devi, Teacher of Kama Sutra
- Harish Patel as Doctor
- Zoya Akhtar as Rasa Devi's Courtesan

== Production ==
Mira Nair had approached A. R. Rahman to compose the score and soundtrack for the film, but he turned down the opportunity citing he was uncomfortable with the film's title. He noted that he did not want international audiences to brand him as "the composer of Kama Sutra fame."

Indira Varma said she did not realize when she read the script there would be explicit scenes in the film. "It wasn't called Kama Sutra when we were filming it," she said. "It was untitled. And then it says in the script, they make love. When you're young and naive and stupid you don't process the idea that it will take one day with your kit off to shoot that sentence".

== Critical reception ==
On the review aggregator website Rotten Tomatoes, the film received 40% positive reviews from 20 professional critics. The website's critical consensus reads: "Kama Sutra refreshingly approaches sensuality from a female perspective, but audiences will be turned off by this romance's silly plotting."

Roger Ebert of the Chicago Sun-Times gave it two out of four, and wrote: "The film is lush and voluptuous to regard, but I expected more from Mira Nair, and I was disappointed. She is better than this work."

== See also ==
- Tales of The Kama Sutra: The Perfumed Garden
- Tales of The Kama Sutra 2: Monsoon
- Kamasutra: The Revenge
