= Tales of The Kama Sutra 2: Monsoon =

2001 film by Jag Mundhra

Tales of The Kama Sutra 2 : Monsoon
- Directed by: Jag Mundhra
- Written by: Jag Mundhra; Greg Heffernan
- Produced by: Jag Mundhra; Kalpana Saxena
- Starring: Richard Tyson; Jenny McShane; Helen Brodie; Gulshan Grover; Doug Jeffery; Matt McCoy
- Cinematography: Blain Brown
- Edited by: Paul James Tierney
- Distributed by: Optima Entertainment
- Release date: 2001
- Running time: 96 minutes
- Countries: United States; India
- Language: English

Tales of the Kama Sutra 2: Monsoon is a 2001 American-Indian dramatic thriller film directed by Jag Mundhra, with an original soundtrack by Alan DerMarderosian. The film takes its title from the ancient Indian text, the Kama Sutra.

The film is also referred to as simply Monsoon. It is one of the director's films that have been labeled as "softcore" productions, although he claimed that such critics had never actually seen them.

== Production ==
The film was produced on a low budget and shot in Goa.

== See also ==
- Kama Sutra: A Tale of Love
- Tales of The Kama Sutra: The Perfumed Garden
- Kamasutra 3D
