= Kamasutra: The Revenge =

Film by Rupesh Paul

- Directed by: Rupesh Paul
- Written by: Rupesh Paul
- Produced by: San2Creations; Rupesh Paul Productions Limited
- Starring: Andria D'Souza; Makarand Deshpande
- Cinematography: Sapan Narula; K G Ratheesh
- Edited by: Ajay Devaloka
- Music by: Saachin; Sreejith; Muhammad Ali (Background score)
- Distributed by: San2Creations
- Country: India
- Language: English

Kamasutra: The Revenge is an epic erotic drama film written and directed by Rupesh Paul. The film was announced at Cannes Film Festival, by Paul after the premiere of his movie, Saint Dracula 3D, at the festival. Set in a historical backdrop, it is the journey of a poignant love amidst deceit and combat. Based on Vatsyayana's ancient Sanskrit literature, the movie narrates the tale of the forbidden world of sex and sensuality and how it transforms one's body, mind, and soul.

== Synopsis ==
A young and beautiful princess is robbed of her dreams when forced to accept a Middle-aged King as her husband. Seething with hatred and revenge comes another princess who is bound to destroy the king and his kingdom. Just like in a game of chess, one wrong move from the princess changes the course of her destiny. As the tussle between love and betrayal continues - the question remains: who will win this game - love or vengeance?

== Cast ==
- Sherlyn Chopra as Kama Devi
- Milind Gunaji as The Mighty King
- King Malkhan as Warrior / Prince / Naga Sadhu
- Tumul Balyan as Warrior / Naga Sadhu
- Makarand Deshpande as King
- Maleena Kan as Princess
- Sushmita Mukherjee as Queen
- Gajendra Chauhan as Kamashastra Guru
- Mohan Kapoor as Kamashastra, Guru's Apprentice
- Nassar as Kama Devi's Father-In-Law
- Amit Behl as Administrator
- Saira Khan
- Kristna Saikia as Japanese Mystic Queen
- Jay Acharya as The Warrior Prince & Kama Devi's First Love (flashback)
- Mohit Keswani as The Mighty King (flashback)
- Andria D'Souza as Arabian Queen
- Sunil Bob
- Manoj Verma
- Aabha Paul
- Julia Bruchhwitz
- Hinixa Patel
- Ziley Mawai
- Dinesh Nair
- Malu S Lal
- Vishal Patni as Warrior / Naga Sadhu

== Production ==
Kamasutra: The Revenge was produced under the house of Rupesh Paul Productions Limited and presented by G J Entertainments. The story has been written by the director. The film is co-produced and designed by Sohan Roy, and Dr George John is the executive producer.

== Music ==
Five of the songs from this film were shortlisted for nominations in the Best Original Song category for the 86th Academy Awards. These songs were:

- "Aygiri Nadani"
- "Har Har Mahadeva"
- "I Felt"
- "Of The Soil"
- "Sawariya"

== Controversy ==
The director Rupesh Paul decided to replace Sherlyn Chopra, after Chopra uploaded a video clip of the photo shoot of the film on her YouTube channel without seeking his permission. He wanted to replace her with Eva Longoria or Mila Kunis. Chopra later apologized to him in writing, stating that she would not say or write anything about the film without the consent of the producers.

On 9 February, Paul filed a lawsuit against Chopra for defamation, alleging that the actress had abused him on the social networking service Twitter. By March, however, both parties dropped the lawsuits, publicly stating that they had decided to move on from the misunderstanding.

== See also ==
- Kama Sutra: A Tale of Love
- Tales of The Kama Sutra: The Perfumed Garden
- Tales of The Kama Sutra 2: Monsoon
