= Rambhadracharya =

Indian Hindu religious leader since 1988 (born 1950)

Swami Rambhadracharya Ji
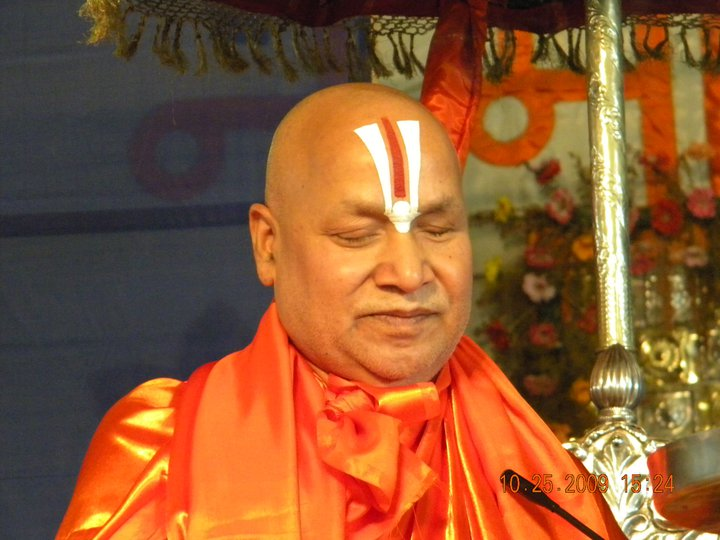
- Rambhadracharya Ji in 2009

Personal life
- Born: Giridhar Mishra; 14 January 1950 (age 76) Sachipuram earlier known as Shandikhurd, Jaunpur district, Uttar Pradesh, India
- Notable work(s): Śrīrāghavakṛpābhāṣyam on Prasthanatrayi, Śrībhārgavarāghavīyam, Bhṛṅgadūtam, Gītarāmāyaṇam, Śrīsītārāmasuprabhātam, Śrīsītārāmakelikaumudi, Aṣṭāvakra, and others
- Honours: Dharmacakravartī, Mahāmahopādhyāya, Śrīcitrakūṭatulasīpīṭhādhīśvara, Jagadguru Rāmānandācārya, Mahākavi, Prasthānatrayībhāṣyakāra, and others
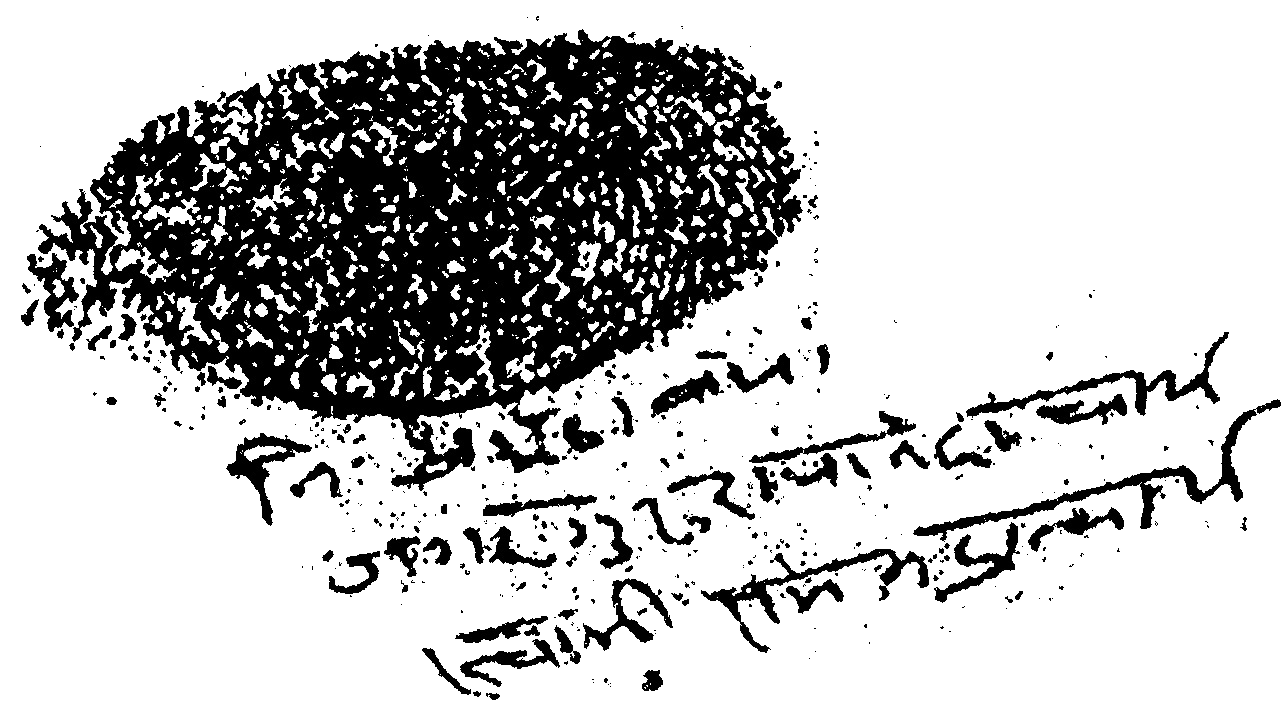
- Signature

Religious life
- Religion: Hinduism
- Founder of: Jagadguru Rambhadracharya Handicapped University; Tulsi Peeth; Tulasi School for the Blind; Jagadguru Rambhadracharya Viklang Seva Sangh; Kanch Mandir; Jagadguru Rambhadracharya Viklang Shikshan Sansthan
- Philosophy: Vishishtadvaita Vedanta
- Sect: Ramanandi sect

Religious career
- Teacher: Ishvardas (Mantra); Ramprasad Tripathi (Sanskrit); Ramcharandas (Sampradaya)
- Successor: Acharya Ramchandra Das
- Disciples: Abhiraj Rajendra Mishra, Dhirendra Krishna Shastri, Prem Bhushan, Nityanand Misra

Quotation

Humanity is my temple, and I am its worshiper. The disabled are my supreme God, and I am their grace seeker.

Jagadguru Ramanandacharya Swami Rambhadracharya (Note: Sanskrit: जगद्गुरुरामानन्दाचार्यस्वामिरामभद्राचार्यः, Sanskrit pronunciation: [dʑɐɡɐdɡʊɽʊ ɽaːmaːnɐndaːtɕaːɽjɐ sʋaːmɪ ɽaːmɐbʱɐdɽaːtɕaːɽjɐh]; Hindi: जगद्गुरु रामानन्दाचार्य स्वामी रामभद्राचार्य, Hindi pronunciation: [dʒəɡədɡuru raːmaːnəndaːtʃaːrjə sʋaːmiː raːmbʱədraːtʃaːrjə]; IAST: Jagadguru Rāmānandācārya Svāmī Rāmabhadrācārya.) (born Giridhar Mishra on 14 January 1950) (Note: Sanskrit: गिरिधरमिश्रः, Sanskrit pronunciation: [ɡɪɽɪdʱɐɽɐ mɪɕɽɐh]; Hindi: गिरिधर मिश्र, Hindi pronunciation: [ɡiridʱər miʃrə]; IAST: Giridhara Miśra.) is an Indian Hindu spiritual leader, educator, Sanskrit scholar, polyglot, poet, author, textual commentator, philosopher, composer, singer, playwright and Katha artist based in Chitrakoot, India. He is one of four incumbent Jagadguru Ramanandacharyas, (Note: Leaders of the Ramananda monastic order.) and has held this title since 1988.

Rambhadracharya is the founder and head of Tulsi Peeth, a religious and social service institution in Chitrakoot named after Tulsidas. He is the founder and lifelong chancellor of the Jagadguru Rambhadracharya Handicapped University in Chitrakoot, which offers graduate and postgraduate courses exclusively to four types of disabled students. Rambhadracharya has been blind since the age of two months, had no formal education until the age of seventeen years, and has never used Braille or any other aid to learn or compose.

Rambhadracharya can speak 22 languages and is a spontaneous poet and writer in Bhojpuri, Sanskrit, Hindi, and several other languages. He has authored more than 240 books and 50 papers, including four epic poems, (Note: Two each in Sanskrit and Hindi.) Hindi commentaries on Tulsidas' Ramcharitmanas and Hanuman Chalisa, a Sanskrit commentary in verse on the Ashtadhyayi, and Sanskrit commentaries on the Prasthanatrayi scriptures. He is acknowledged for his knowledge in diverse fields including Sanskrit grammar, Nyaya and Vedanta. He is regarded as one of the greatest authorities on Tulsidas in India, and is the editor of a critical edition of the Ramcharitmanas. He is a Katha artist for the Ramayana and the Bhagavata. His Katha programmes are held regularly in different cities in India and other countries, and are telecast on television channels like Shubh TV, Sanskar TV and Sanatan TV. He is also a leader of the Vishva Hindu Parishad (VHP).

== Birth and early life ==
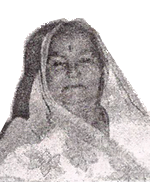
Shachidevi Mishra, mother of Rambhadracharya

Acharya Ramchandra Das, successor

Rambhadracharya was born to Rajdev Mishra and Shachidevi Mishra in a Saryupareen Brahmin family of the Vasishtha Gotra (lineage of the sage Vasishtha) in Shandikhurd village in the Jaunpur district, Uttar Pradesh, India. He was born on Makara Sankranti day, 14 January 1950. He was named Giridhar by his great-aunt, a paternal cousin of his paternal grandfather, Suryabali Mishra. The great-aunt was a devotee of Mirabai, a female saint of the Bhakti era in medieval India, who used the name Giridhar to address the god Krishna in her compositions.

== Loss of eyesight ==
Giridhar lost his eyesight at the age of two months. On 24 March 1950, his eyes were infected by trachoma. There were no advanced facilities for treatment in the village, so he was taken to an elderly woman in a nearby village who was known to cure trachoma boils to provide relief. The woman applied a paste of myrobalan to Giridhar's eyes to burst the lumps, but his eyes started bleeding, resulting in the loss of his eyesight. His family took him to the King George Hospital in Lucknow, where his eyes were treated for 21 days, but his sight could not be restored. Various Ayurvedic, Homeopathic, Allopathic, and other practitioners were approached in Sitapur, Lucknow, and Bombay, but to no avail. Rambhadracharya has been blind ever since. He cannot read or write, as he does not use Braille; he learns by listening and composes by dictating to scribes.

=== Childhood accident ===
In June 1953, at a juggler's monkey dance show in the village, the children—including Giridhar—suddenly ran away when the monkey began to touch them. Giridhar fell into a small dry well and was trapped for some time, until a teenage girl rescued him. His grandfather told him that his life was saved because he had learned, that very morning itself, the following line of a verse in the Ramcharitmanas (1.192.4), from the episode of the manifestation of the god Rama:

यह चरित जे गावहिं हरिपद पावहिं ते न परहिं भवकूपा ॥
yaha carita je gāvahı̐ haripada pāvahı̐ te na parahı̐ bhavakūpā ॥

Those who sing this character (of Rama), they attain to the feet of Hari (Vishnu) and never fall into the well of birth and death.

Even after he fell into the well, Giridhar was confident that Rama will somehow rescue him from this "kupa" (well). Thereafter, Giridhar's grandfather asked him to recite the verse always, and from then on, Giridhar has followed the practice of reciting it every time he takes water or food.

=== First composition ===
Giridhar's initial education came from his paternal grandfather, as his father worked in Bombay. In the afternoons, his grandfather would narrate to him various episodes of the Hindu epics Ramayana and Mahabharata, and devotional works like Vishramsagar, Sukhsagar, Premsagar and Brajvilas. At the age of three, Giridhar composed his first piece of poetry—in Awadhi—and recited it to his grandfather. In this verse, Krishna's foster mother Yashoda is fighting with a Gopi (milkmaid) for hurting Krishna.

Devanagari
मेरे गिरिधारी जी से काहे लरी।
तुम तरुणी मेरो गिरिधर बालक काहे भुजा पकरी॥
सुसुकि सुसुकि मेरो गिरिधर रोवत तू मुसुकात खरी॥
तू अहिरिन अतिसय झगराऊ बरबस आय खरी॥
गिरिधर कर गहि कहत जसोदा आँचर ओट करी॥

IAST
mere giridhārī jī se kāhe larī।
tuma taruṇī mero giridhara bālaka kāhe bhujā pakarī॥
susuki susuki mero giridhara rovata tū musukāta kharī॥
tū ahirina atisaya jhagarāū barabasa āya kharī॥
giridhara kara gahi kahata jasodā ā̐cara oṭa karī॥

"'Why did you fight with my Giridhara (Krishna)? You are a young maiden, and my Giridhara (Krishna) is but a child, why did you hold his arm? My Giridhara (Krishna) is crying, sobbing repeatedly, and you stand there smirking! O Ahir lady (cowherd girl), you are excessively inclined to quarrel, and come and stand here uninvited' – so says Yashoda, holding on to the hand of Giridhara (Krishna) and covering [his face] with the end of her Sari", sings Giridhara (the poet).

=== Mastering Gita and Ramcharitmanas ===
At the age of five, Giridhar memorised the entire Bhagavad Gita, 700 verses with chapter and verse numbers, in 15 days, with the help of his neighbour, Murlidhar Mishra. On Janmashtami day in 1955, he recited the entire Bhagavad Gita. He released the first Braille version of the scripture, with the original Sanskrit text and a Hindi commentary, at New Delhi on 30 November 2007, 52 years after memorising the Gita. At the age of seven Giridhar, he memorised the entire Ramcharitmanas of Tulsidas, consisting of around 10,900 verses with chapter and verse numbers, in 60 days, assisted by his grandfather. On Rama Navami day in 1957, he recited the entire epic while fasting. Later, Giridhar went on to memorise the Vedas, the Upanishads, works of Sanskrit grammar, the Bhagavata Purana, all the works of Tulsidas, and many other works in Sanskrit and Indian literature.

=== Upanayana and discourses ===
Giridhar's Upanayana (sacred thread ceremony) was performed on Nirjala Ekadashi (the Ekadashi falling in the bright half of the lunar month of Jyeshtha) of 24 June 1968. On this day, besides being given the Gayatri Mantra, he was initiated (given Diksha) into the mantra of Rama by Pandit Ishvardas Maharaj of Ayodhya. Having mastered the Bhagavad Gita and Ramcharitmanas at a very young age, Giridhar started visiting the Katha programmes held near his village once every three years in the intercalary month of Purushottama. The third time he attended, he presented a Katha on Ramcharitmanas, which was acclaimed by several famous exponents of the Katha art.

=== Discrimination by family ===
When Giridhar was eleven, he was stopped from joining his family in a wedding procession. His family thought that his presence would be a bad omen for the marriage. This incident left a strong impression on Giridhar; he says at the beginning of his autobiography:

I am the same person who was considered to be inauspicious for accompanying a marriage party. ... I am the same person who currently inaugurates the biggest of marriage parties or welfare ceremonies. What is all this? It is all due to the grace of God which turns a straw into a vajra and a vajra into a straw.

== Formal education ==
=== Schooling ===
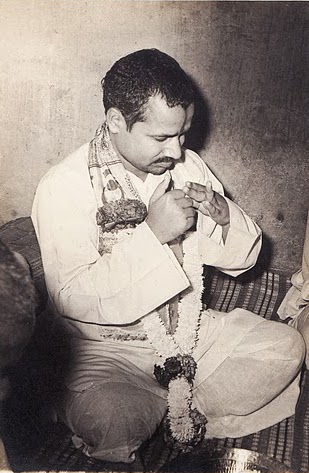
A young Giridhar Mishra in an undated photo

Although Giridhar did not have any formal schooling until the age of seventeen years, he had learned many literary works as a child by listening to them. His family wished him to become a Kathavachak (Narrator of Hindu literature, Epics and stories) but Giridhar wanted to pursue his studies. His father explored possibilities for his education in Varanasi and thought of sending him to a special school for blind students. Giridhar's mother refused to send him there, saying that blind children were not treated well at the school. On 7 July 1967 Giridhar joined the Adarsh Gaurishankar Sanskrit College in the nearby Sujanganj village of Jaunpur to study Sanskrit Vyakarana (grammar), Hindi, English, Maths, History, and Geography. In his autobiography he recalls this day as the day when the "Golden Journey" of his life began. With an ability to memorise material by listening to it just once, Giridhar has not used Braille or other aids to study. In three months, he had memorised and mastered the entire Laghusiddhāntakaumudī of Varadaraja. He was top of his class for four years, and passed the Uttara Madhyama (higher secondary) examination in Sanskrit with first class and distinction.

First Sanskrit composition

At the Adarsh Gaurishankar Sanskrit College, Giridhar learnt the eight Ganas of Sanskrit prosody while studying Chandaprabhā, a work on Sanskrit prosody. The next day, he composed his first Sanskrit verse, in the Bhujaṅgaprayāta metre.

Devanagari
महाघोरशोकाग्निनाऽऽतप्यमानं
पतन्तं निरासारसंसारसिन्धौ ।
अनाथं जडं मोहपाशेन बद्धं
प्रभो पाहि मां सेवकक्लेशहर्त्तः ॥

IAST
mahāghoraśokāgninā'tapyamānaṃ
patantaṃ nirāsārasaṃsārasindhau ।
nāthaṃ jaḍaṃ mohapāśena baddhaṃ
prabho pāhi māṃ sevakakleśaharttaḥ ॥

O omnipotent Lord, remover of the distress of your worshippers! Protect me, who is being consumed by the extremely dreadful fire of sorrows, who is helplessly falling in the ocean of the mundane world, who is without any protector, who is ignorant, and who is bonded by the shackles of delusion.

=== Graduation and masters ===
In 1971 Giridhar enrolled at the Sampurnanand Sanskrit University in Varanasi for higher studies in Vyakarana. He topped the final examination for the Shastri (Bachelor of Arts) degree in 1974, and then enrolled for the Acharya (Master of Arts) degree at the same institute. While pursuing his master's degree, he visited New Delhi to participate in various national competitions at the All-India Sanskrit Conference, where he won five out of the eight gold medals—in Vyakarana, Samkhya, Nyaya, Vedanta, and Sanskrit Antakshari. Indira Gandhi, then Prime Minister of India, presented the five gold medals, along with the Chalvaijayanti trophy for Uttar Pradesh, to Giridhar. Impressed by his abilities, Gandhi offered to send him at her own expense to the United States for treatment for his eyes, but Giridhar turned down this offer, replying with an extemporaneous Sanskrit verse.

Devanagari
किं दृष्टव्यं पतितजगति व्याप्तदोषेऽप्यसत्ये
मायाचाराव्रततनुभृतां पापराजद्विचारे ।
दृष्टव्योऽसौ चिकुरनिकुरैः पूर्णवक्त्रारविन्दः
पूर्णानन्दो धृतशिशुतनुः रामचन्द्रो मुकुन्दः ॥

IAST
kiṃ dṛṣṭavyaṃ patitajagati vyāptadoṣe'pyasatye
māyācārāvratatanubhṛtāṃ pāparājadvicāre ।
dṛṣṭavyo'sau cikuranikuraiḥ pūrṇavaktrāravindaḥ
pūrṇānando dhṛtaśiśutanuḥ rāmacandro mukundaḥ ॥

What is to be seen in this fallen world, which is false and filled with vices, is full of disputes and is governed by the sins of deceitful and wicked humans? Only Rama is worth seeing, whose flocks of hair cover his lotus-like face, who is completely blissful, who has the form of a child, and who is the giver of liberation.

In 1976 Giridhar topped the final Acharya examinations in Vyakarana, winning seven gold medals and the Chancellor's gold medal. In a rare achievement, although he had only enrolled for a master's degree in Vyakarana, he was declared Acharya of all subjects taught at the university on 30 April 1976.

=== Doctorate and post-doctorate ===
After completing his master's degree, Giridhar enrolled for the doctoral Vidyavaridhi (PhD) degree at the same institute, under Ramprasad Tripathi. He received a research fellowship from the University Grants Commission (UGC), but even so, he faced financial hardship during the next five years. He completed his Vidyavaridhi degree in Sanskrit grammar on 14 October 1981. His dissertation was titled Adhyātmarāmāyaṇe'pāṇinīyaprayogānāṃ Vimarśaḥ, or Deliberation on the non-Paninian usages in the Adhyatma Ramayana. The thesis was authored in only thirteen days in 1981. On completion of his doctorate, the UGC offered him the position of head of the Vyakarana department of the Sampurnanand Sanskrit University. However, Giridhar did not accept; he decided to devote his life to the service of religion, society, and those with disabilities.

On 9 May 1997, Giridhar (now known as Rambhadracharya) was awarded the post-doctorate Vachaspati (DLitt) degree by Sampurnanand Sanskrit University for his 2000-page Sanskrit dissertation Pāṇinīyāṣṭādhyāyyāḥ Pratisūtraṃ Śābdabodhasamīkṣā, or Investigation into verbal knowledge of every Sūtra of the Ashtadhyayi of Panini. The degree was presented to him by K. R. Narayanan, then President of India. In this work, Rambhadracharya explained each aphorism of the grammar of Panini in Sanskrit verses.

== Later life ==
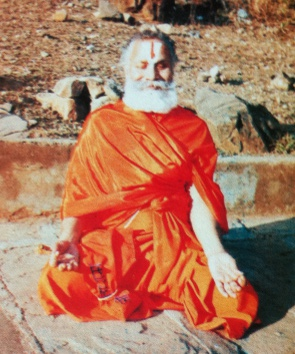
Rambhadracharya meditating on the banks of Mandakini River during a Payovrata. He is seated in the Sukhasana pose with fingers folded in the Chin Mudra.

=== 1979–1988 ===
Virakta Diksha

In 1976 Giridhar narrated a Katha on Ramcharitmanas to Swami Karpatri, who advised him not to marry, to stay a lifelong Brahmachari (celibate bachelor) and to take initiation in a Srivaishnava Sampradaya (a sect worshipping Vishnu, Krishna, or Rama as the supreme God). Giridhar took vairagi (renouncer) initiation or Virakta Diksha in the Ramananda Sampradaya on the Kartika full-moon day of 19 November 1983 from Shri Ramcharandas Maharaj Phalahari. He now came to be known as Rambhadradas.

Six-month fasts

Following the fifth verse of the Dohavali composed by Tulsidas, Rambhadradas observed a six-month Payovrata, a diet of only milk and fruits, at Chitrakoot in 1979.

Devanagari
पय अहार फल खाइ जपु राम नाम षट मास ।
सकल सुमंगल सिद्धि सब करतल तुलसीदास ॥

IAST
paya ahāra phala khāi japu rāma nāma ṣaṭa māsa ।
sakala sumaṃgala siddhi saba karatala tulasīdāsa ॥

Chant the name of Rama subsisting on a diet of milk and fruits for six months. Says Tulsidas, on doing so, all auspiciousness and accomplishments will be in one's hand.

In 1983 he observed his second Payovrata beside the Sphatik Shila in Chitrakoot. The Payovrata has become a regular part of Rambhadradas' life. In 2002, in his sixth Payovrata, he composed the Sanskrit epic Śrībhārgavarāghavīyam. He continues to observe Payovratas, the latest (2010–2011) being his ninth.

Tulsi Peeth

In 1987 Rambhadradas established a religious and social service institution called Tulsi Peeth (The seat of Tulsi) in Chitrakoot, where, according to the Ramayana, Rama had spent twelve out of his fourteen years of exile. As the founder of the seat, the title of Śrīcitrakūṭatulasīpīṭhādhīśvara (literally, the Lord of the Tulsi Peeth at Chitrakoot) was bestowed upon him by Sadhus and intellectuals. In the Tulsi Peeth, he arranged for a temple devoted to Rama and his "Patni"Sita to be constructed, which is known as Kanch Mandir ("glass temple").

=== Post of Jagadguru Ramanandacharya ===
Rambhadradas was chosen as the Jagadguru Ramanandacharya seated at the Tulsi Peeth by the Kashi Vidwat Parishad in Varanasi on 24 June 1988. On 3 February 1989, at the Kumbh Mela in Allahabad, the appointment was unanimously supported by the Mahants of the three Akharas, the four sub-Sampradayas, the Khalsas and saints of the Ramananda Sampradaya. On 1 August 1995 he was ritually anointed as the Jagadguru Ramanandacharya in Ayodhya by the Digambar Akhara. Thereafter he was known as Jagadguru Ramanandacharya Swami Rambhadracharya.

=== Deposition in the Ayodhya case ===
In July 2003 Rambhadracharya deposed as an expert witness for religious matters (OPW 16) in Other Original Suit Number 5 of the Ram Janmabhoomi Babri Masjid dispute case in the Allahabad High Court. Some portions of his affidavit and cross examination are quoted in the final judgement by the High Court. In his affidavit, he cited the ancient Hindu scriptures including the Ramayana, Rāmatāpanīya Upaniṣad, Skanda Purana, Yajurveda, Atharvaveda, and others describing Ayodhya as a city holy to Hindus and the birthplace of Rama. He cited verses from two works composed by Tulsidas which, in his opinion, are relevant to the dispute. The first citation consisted of eight verses from a work called Dohā Śataka, which describe the destruction of a temple and construction of a mosque at the disputed site in 1528 CE by Mughal ruler Babur, who had ordered General Mir Baqui to destroy the Rama temple, considered a symbol of worship by sanatana dharmi. The second citation was a verse from a work called Kavitāvalī, which mentions a mosque. In his cross examination, he described in some detail the history of the Ramananda sect, its Mathas, rules regarding Mahants, formation and working of Akharas, and Tulsidas' works. Refuting the possibility of the original temple being to the north of the disputed area, as pleaded by the pro-mosque parties, he described the boundaries of the Janmabhoomi as mentioned in the Ayodhya Mahatmya section of Skanda Purana, which tallied with the present location of the disputed area, as noted by Justice Sudhir Agarwal. However, he stated that he had no knowledge of whether there was a Ram Chabootra ("Platform of Rama") outside the area that was locked from 1950 to 1985 and where the Chati Poojan Sthal was, nor whether the idols of Rama, his brother Lakshmana, and Sita were installed at Ram Chabootra outside the Janmabhoomi temple.

=== Multilingual ===
Rambhadracharya is a scholar of 14 languages and can speak 22 languages in total, including Sanskrit, Hindi, English, French, Bhojpuri, Maithili, Oriya, Gujarati, Punjabi, Marathi, Magadhi, Awadhi, and Braj. He has composed poems and literary works in many Indian languages, including Sanskrit, Hindi, and Awadhi. He has translated many of his works of poetry and prose into other languages. He delivers Katha programmes in various languages, including Hindi, Bhojpuri, and Gujarati.

=== Institutes for the disabled ===
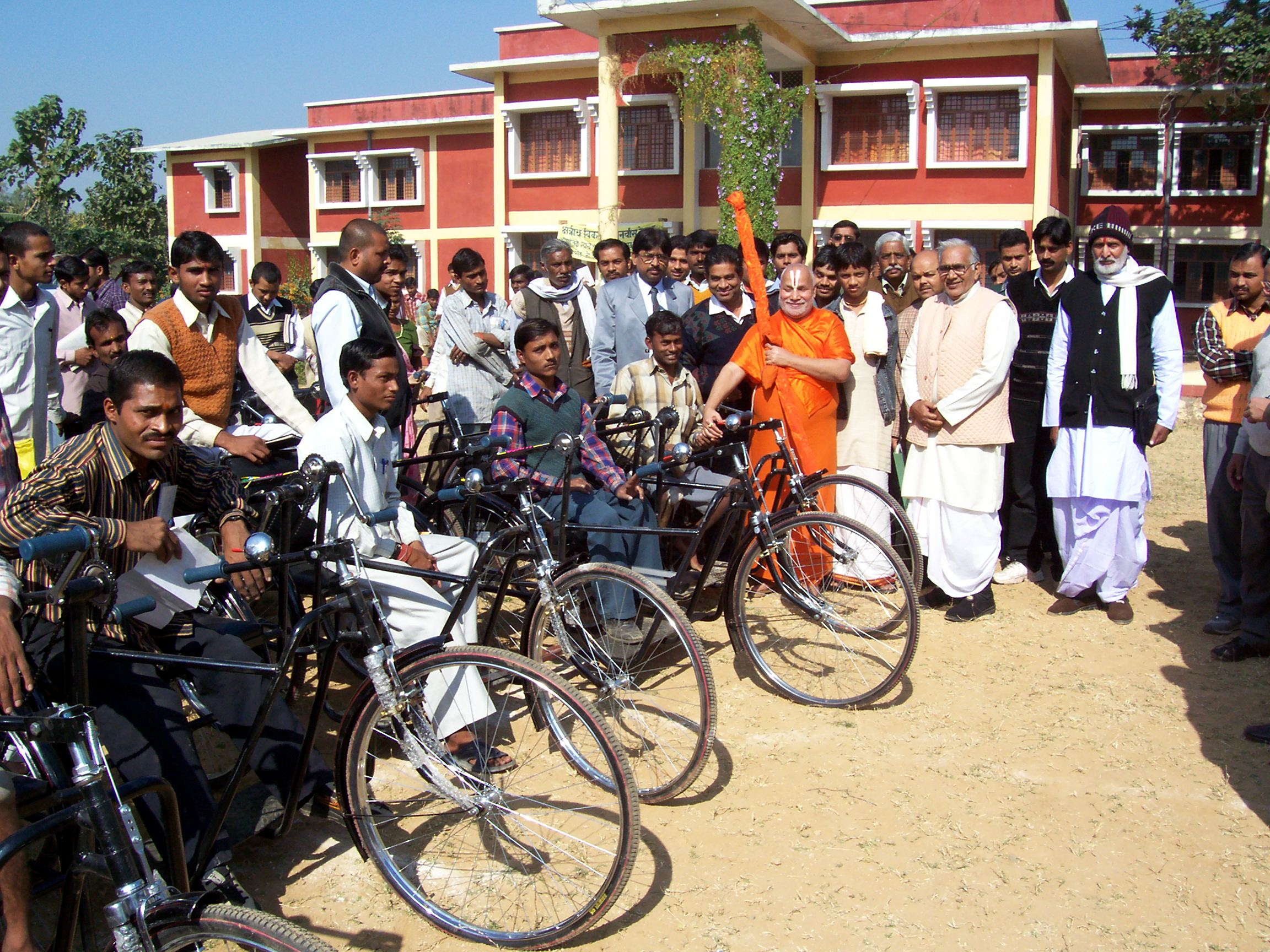
Rambhadracharya with mobility-impaired students in front of the main building of Jagadguru Rambhadracharya Handicapped University on 2 January 2005

On 23 August 1996 Rambhadracharya established the Tulsi School for the Blind in Chitrakoot, Uttar Pradesh. He founded the Jagadguru Rambhadracharya Handicapped University, an institution of higher learning solely for disabled students, on 27 September 2001 in Chitrakoot. This is the first university in the world exclusively for those with disabilities. The university was created by an ordinance of the Uttar Pradesh Government, which was later passed as Uttar Pradesh State Act 32 (2001) by the Uttar Pradesh legislature. The act appointed Swami Rambhadracharya as the lifelong chancellor of the university. The university offers graduate, post-graduate, and doctorate degrees in various subjects, including Sanskrit, Hindi, English, Sociology, Psychology, Music, Drawing and Painting, Fine Arts, Special Education, Education, History, Culture and Archeology, Computer and Information Sciences, Vocational Education, Law, Economics, and Prosthetics and Orthotics. The university plans to start offering courses in Ayurveda and Medical Sciences from 2013. Admissions are restricted to the four types of disabled students—visually impaired, hearing impaired, mobility impaired, and mentally impaired—as defined by the Disability Act (1995) of the Government of India. According to the Government of Uttar Pradesh, the university is among the chief educational institutes for Information Technology and Electronics in the state.

Rambhadracharya also founded an organisation called Jagadguru Rambhadracharya Viklang Seva Sangh, headquartered in Satna, Madhya Pradesh. Its goal is to create community awareness and initiate child development programmes in rural India. Its primary objective is to supplement the education programmes of Jagadguru Rambhadracharya Handicapped University by helping disabled children get a good education. Aid is generally given in the form of facilities which enable easier access to education. Rambhadracharya also runs a hundred-bed hospital in Gujarat.

=== Critical edition of Ramcharitmanas ===
The Ramcharitmanas was composed by Tulsidas in the late sixteenth century. It has been extremely popular in northern India over the last four hundred years, and is often referred to as the "Bhagvad gita of northern India" by Western Indologists. Rambhadracharya produced a critical edition of the Ramcharitmanas, which was published as the Tulsi Peeth edition. Apart from the original text, for which Rambhadracharya has relied extensively on older manuscripts, there were differences in spelling, grammar, and prosodic conventions between the Tulsi Peeth edition and contemporary editions of the Ramcharitmanas.

In November 2009, Rambhadracharya was accused of tampering with the epic, but the dispute died down after Rambhadracharya expressed his regret for any annoyance or pain caused by the publication. A writ petition was also filed against him but it was dismissed. This edition was published in 2005 by Shri Tulsi Peeth Seva Nyas.

=== Assassination threats ===
In November 2007 someone claiming to be an al-Qaeda member sent Rambhadracharya a letter telling him and his disciples either to accept Islam or to be prepared to die. Police superintendent Kamal Singh Rathore said that this letter had been sent from Haridwar, that Rambhadracharya's security arrangements had been increased and that an intensive investigation of the letter had been carried out. Gita Devi, secretary of JRHU, said that Rambhadracharya had been threatened by al-Qaeda, as Ram Janmabhoomi Nyas president Nrityagopal had been in the past.

In November 2014, Rambhadracharya received another assassination threat with a demand of "terror tax" over JRHU operations.

=== Participation in 84-kosi yatra ===
On 25 August 2013, Rambhadracharya arrived at the Chaudhary Charan Singh Airport in Lucknow along with VHP leader Ashok Singhal. He was going to Ayodhya to take part in the 84-kosi yatra, a 12-day religious yatra which was banned by the state government citing law and order reasons. It is alleged that the ban was due to opposition from Muslim organisations or vote-bank politics. Rambhadracharya's participation in the yatra was kept secret. Rambhadracharya was put under house arrest at the home of R C Mishra, his disciple and friend.

On 26 August 2013, a local lawyer Ranjana Agnihotri filed a habeas corpus petition in the Allahabad High Court's Lucknow bench, on which judges Imtiyaz Murtaza and D K Upadhayaya passed the release order for Rambhadracharya, along with Singhal and Praveen Togadia. The petitioner's advocate H S Jain said that even though Rambhadracharya and other leaders were arrested under the section 151 of the 1973 Criminal Procedure Code, which permits an arrest to prevent commission of cognisable offences, the custody period cannot exceed 24 hours unless any other section of the code or any other law is applicable. After his release, Rambhadracharya said that the government had been creating misconceptions about the yatra.

Two days after the incident, Rambhadracharya was given Y-category security cover by the Uttar Pradesh government since he had reported security threats. Hindustan Times reported that this grant could be a possible attempt to "build bridges with the sadhus after the Sunday showdown." Government officials said that a high-powered committee will decide on the continuation of the security cover. JRHU vice-chancellor B Pandey said that Rambhadracharya met Uttar Pradesh chief minister Akhilesh Yadav in Lucknow and invited him to be the chief guest in a University function, and Yadav accepted the invitation. However, Yadav did not attend the function due to difficult circumstances, but sent the Energy Minister of State Vijay Mishra and Secondary Education Minister of State Vijay Bahadur Pal. Rambhadracharya was disappointed that Yadav could not "come for even 15 minutes for disabled children," and said that he will have atone for this.

== Works ==
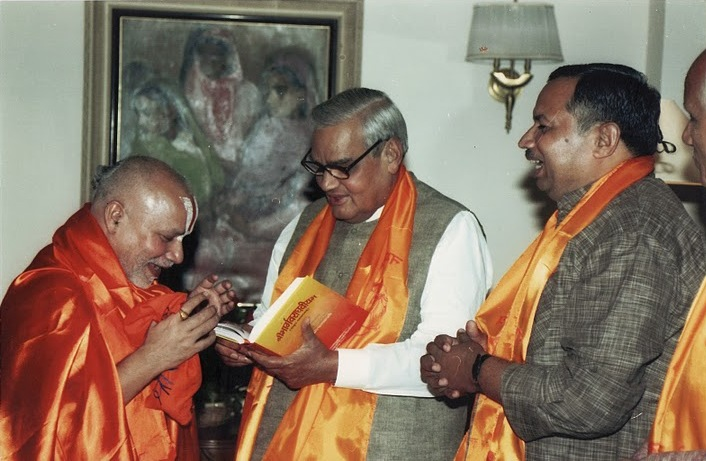
Śrībhārgavarāghaviyam being released by Atal Bihari Vajpayee (centre) in 2002. Rambhadracharya is to the left.

Rambhadracharya has authored more than 250 books and 50 papers, including published books and unpublished manuscripts. Various audio and video recordings have also been released. His major literary and musical compositions are listed below.

=== Poetry and plays ===
- (1) Kākā Vidura (काका विदुर) – Hindi minor poem.
- (1982) Mā̐ Śabarī (मा̐ शबरी) – Hindi minor poem.
- (1991) Rāghavagītaguñjana (राघवगीतगुञ्जन) – Hindi lyrical poem.
- (1993) Bhaktigītasudhā (भक्तिगीतसुधा) – Hindi lyrical poem.
- (1994) Arundhatī (अरुन्धती) – Hindi epic poem.
- (1996) Ājādacandraśekharacaritam (आजादचन्द्रशेखरचरितम्) – Sanskrit minor poem.
- (1996) Āryāśatakam (आर्याशतकम्) – Sanskrit hymn of praise.
- (1996) Gaṇapatiśatakam (गणपतिशतकम्) – Sanskrit hymn of praise.
- (1996) Caṇḍīśatakam (चण्डीशतकम्) – Sanskrit hymn of praise.
- (1996) Jānakīkṛpākaṭākṣam (जानकीकृपाकटाक्षम्) – Sanskrit hymn of praise.
- (1996) Mukundasmaraṇam (मुकुन्दस्मरणम्) – Sanskrit hymn of praise.
- (1996) Śrīrāghavābhyudayam (श्रीराघवाभ्युदयम्) – Single-act Sanskrit play-poem.
- (1996) Śrīrāghavendraśatakam (श्रीराघवेन्द्रशतकम्) – Sanskrit hymn of praise.
- (1997) Aṣṭādhyāyyāḥ Pratisūtraṃ Śābdabodhasamīkṣaṇam (अष्टाध्याय्याः प्रतिसूत्रं शाब्दबोधसमीक्षणम्) – Sanskrit commentary in verse on the Sutras of the Ashtadhyayi.
- (1997) Śrīrāmabhaktisarvasvam (श्रीरामभक्तिसर्वस्वम्) – Sanskrit poem of one hundred verses.
- (1998) Śrīgaṅgāmahimnastotram (श्रीगङ्गामहिम्नस्तोत्रम्) – Sanskrit hymn of praise.
- (2001) Sarayūlaharī (सरयूलहरी) – Sanskrit minor poem.
- (2001) Laghuraghuvaram (लघुरघुवरम्) – Sanskrit minor poem.
- (2001) Namo Rāghavāya (नमो राघवाय) – Sanskrit hymn of praise.
- (2001) Śrīnarmadāṣṭakam (श्रीनर्मदाष्टकम्) – Sanskrit hymn of praise on the river Narmada.
- (2001) Bhaktisārasarvasvam (भक्तिसारसर्वस्वम्) – Sanskrit hymn of praise.
- (2001) Ślokamauktikam (श्लोकमौक्तिकम्) – Sanskrit hymn of praise.
- (2001) Śrīrāghavacaraṇacihnaśatakam (श्रीराघवचरणचिह्नशतकम्) – Sanskrit hymn of praise.
- (2001) Śrījānakīcaraṇacihnaśatakam (श्रीजानकीचरणचिह्नशतकम्) – Sanskrit hymn of praise.
- (2001) Śrīrāmavallabhāstotram (श्रीरामवल्लभास्तोत्रम्) – Sanskrit hymn of praise.
- (2010) Sarvarogaharāṣṭakam (सर्वरोगहराष्टकम्) – Sanskrit hymn of praise.
- (2001) Śrīcitrakūṭavihāryaṣṭakam (श्रीचित्रकूटविहार्यष्टकम्) – Sanskrit hymn of praise.
- (2001) Śrījānakīkṛpākaṭākṣastotram (श्रीजानकीकृपाकटाक्षस्तोत्रम्) – Sanskrit hymn of praise.
- (2002) Śrībhārgavarāghavīyam (श्रीभार्गवराघवीयम्) – Sanskrit epic poem. The poet was awarded the 2004 Sahitya Akademi Award for Sanskrit for the epic.
- (2002) Śrīrāghavabhāvadarśanam (श्रीराघवभावदर्शनम्) – Sanskrit minor poem.
- (2003) Kubjāpatram (कुब्जापत्रम्) – Sanskrit letter poem.
- (2004) Bhṛṅgadūtam (भृङ्गदूतम्) – Sanskrit minor poem of the Dūtakāvya (messenger-poem) category.
- (2007) Manmathāriśatakam (मन्मथारिशतकम्) – Sanskrit hymn of praise.
- (2008) Caraṇapīḍāharāṣṭakam (चरणपीडाहराष्टकम्) – Sanskrit hymn of praise.
- (2008) Śrīsītārāmakelikaumudī (श्रीसीतारामकेलिकौमुदी) – Hindi Rītikāvya (procedural-era Hindi poem).
- (2009) Śrīsītārāmasuprabhātam (श्रीसीतारामसुप्रभातम्) – A Sanskrit suprabhatam.
- (2010) Aṣṭāvakra (अष्टावक्र) – Hindi epic poem.
- (2011) Gītarāmāyaṇam (गीतरामायणम्) – Sanskrit lyrical epic poem.
- (2011) Avadha Kai Ajoriyā (अवध कै अजोरिया) – Awadhi lyrical poem.
- (2011) Śrīsītāsudhānidhiḥ (श्रीसीतासुधानिधिः) – Sanskrit minor poem of the Stotraprabandhakāvya category.

=== Prose ===
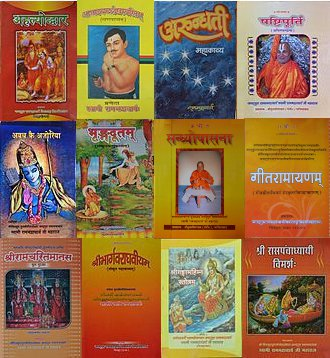
Covers of some books edited or authored by Rambhadracharya.

==== Sanskrit commentaries on Prasthanatrayi ====
Rambhadracharya composed Sanskrit commentaries titled Śrīrāghavakṛpābhāṣyam on the Prasthanatrayi scriptures – the Brahma Sutra, the Bhagavad Gita, and eleven Upanishads. These commentaries were released on 10 April 1998 by Atal Bihari Vajpayee, then Prime Minister of India. Rambhadracharya composed Śrīrāghavakṛpābhāṣyam on Narada Bhakti Sutra in 1991. He thus revived the tradition of writing Sanskrit commentaries on the Prasthanatrayi. He also gave the Ramananda Sampradaya its second commentary on Prasthanatrayi in Sanskrit, the first being the Ānandabhāṣyam, composed by Ramananda himself. Rambhadracharya's commentary in Sanskrit on the Prasthanatrayi was the first written in almost 500 years.

==== Other prose works ====
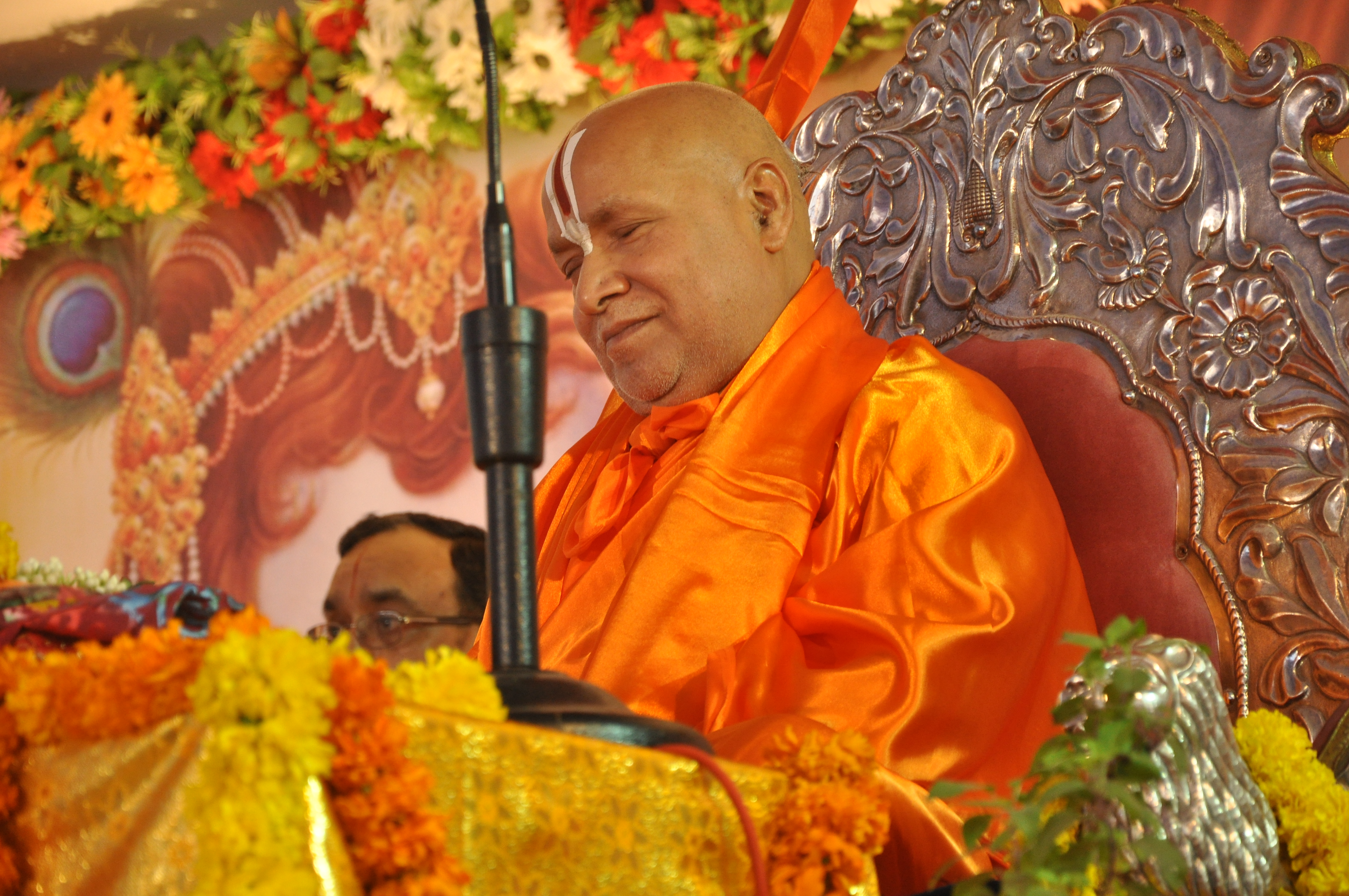
Rambhadracharya delivering a discourse. He has delivered many discourses, some of which have been published as books.

- (1982) Bharata Mahimā (भरत महिमा) – Hindi discourse.
- (1981) Adhyātmarāmāyaṇe Apāṇinīyaprayogānāṃ Vimarśaḥ (अध्यात्मरामायणे अपाणिनीयप्रयोगानां विमर्शः) – Sanskrit dissertation (PhD thesis).
- (1982) Mānasa Me̐ Tāpasa Prasaṅga (मानस में तापस प्रसंग) – Hindi deliberation.
- (1983) Mahavīrī (महावीरी) – Hindi commentary on Hanuman Chalisa.
- (1985) Sugrīva Kā Agha Aura Vibhīṣaṇa Kī Karatūti (सुग्रीव का अघ और विभीषण की करतूति) – Hindi discourse.
- (1985) Śrīgītātātparya (श्रीगीतातात्पर्य) – Hindi commentary on the Bhagavad Gita.
- (1988) Sanātanadharma Kī Vigrahasvarūpa Gomātā (सनातनधर्म की विग्रहस्वरूप गोमाता) – Hindi deliberation.
- (1988) Śrītulasīsāhitya me̐ Kṛṣṇa Kathā (श्रीतुलसीसाहित्य में कृष्णकथा) – Hindi investigative research.
- (1989) Mānasa me̐ Sumitrā (मानस में सुमित्रा) – Hindi discourse.
- (1990) Sīta Nirvāsana Nahī̐ (सीता निर्वासन नहीं) – Hindi critique.
- (1991) Śrīnāradabhaktisūtreṣu Śrīrāghavakṛpābhāṣyam (श्रीनारदभक्तिसूत्रेषु श्रीराघवकृपाभाष्यम्) – Sanskrit commentary on the Narada Bhakti Sutra.
- (1992) Prabhu Kari Kṛpā Pā̐varī Dīnhī (प्रभु करि कृपा पाँवरी दीन्ही) – Hindi discourse.
- (1993) Parama Baḍabhāgī Jaṭāyu (परम बड़भागी जटायु) – Hindi discourse.
- (2001) Śrīrāmastavarājastotre Śrīrāghavakṛpābhāṣyam (श्रीरामस्तवराजस्तोत्रे श्रीराघवकृपाभाष्यम्) – Sanskrit commentary on the Rāmastavarājastotra.
- (2001) Śrī Sītārāma Vivāha Darśana (श्री सीताराम दर्शन) – Hindi discourse.
- (2004) Tuma Pāvaka Ma̐ha Karahu Nivāsā (तुम पावक मँह करहु निवासा) – Hindi discourse.
- (2005) Bhāvārthabodhinī (भावार्थबोधिनी) – Hindi commentary on the Ramcharitmanas.
- (2007) Śrīrāsapañcādhyāyīvimarśaḥ (श्रीरासपञ्चाध्यायीविमर्शः) – Hindi deliberation on Rāsapañcādhyāyī.
- (2006) Ahalyoddhāra (अहल्योद्धार) – Hindi discourse.
- (2008) Hara Te Bhe Hanumāna (हर ते भे हनुमान) – Hindi discourse.
- (2009) Satya Rāmapremī Śrīdaśaratha (सत्य रामप्रेमी श्रीदशरथ) – Hindi discourse on the character of Dasharatha.
- (2011) Veṇugīta (वेणुगीत) – Hindi discourse on chapter 21 from Book 10 of Śrīmadbhāgavatam.

=== Audio and video ===
- (2001) Bhajana Sarayū (भजन सरयू) – Audio CD with eight bhajans (devotional hymns) in Hindi devoted to Rama. Composed, set to music, and sung by Rambhadracharya. Released by Yuki Cassettes, Delhi.
- (2001) Bhajana Yamunā (भजन यमुना) – Audio CD with seven bhajans in Hindi devoted to Krishna. Composed, set to music, and sung by Rambhadracharya. Released by Yuki Cassettes, Delhi.
- (2009) Śrī Hanumat Bhakti (श्री हनुमत् भक्ति) – Audio CD with six bhajans in Hindi devoted to Hanuman, and composed by Tulsidas. Set to music and sung by Rambhadracharya. Released by Kuber Music, New Delhi.
- (2009) Śrīsītārāmasuprabhātam (श्रीसीतारामसुप्रभातम्) – Audio CD of Śrīsītārāmasuprabhātam, a Sanskrit Suprabhata poem. Composed, set to music, and sung in the Vairagi Raga by Rambhadracharya. Released by Yuki Cassettes, Delhi.
- (2009) Sundara Kāṇḍa (सुन्दर काण्ड) – DVD with a musical rendition of and commentary on the Sundar Kand of Ramcharitmanas. Spoken, set to music, and sung by Rambhadracharya. Released by Yuki Cassettes, Delhi.

== Literary style ==
Rewa Prasad Dwivedi writes in his Sanskrit poem dedicated to Rambhadracharya that he is an encyclopaedia of learning whose literature is like numerous Narmadā rivers flowing out simultaneously, and in whose literary works Shiva and Parvati delight while performing Tandava and Lasya.

Devarshi Kala Nath Shastry writes in his review of Rambhadracharya's works that Rambhadracharya is an accomplished and eloquent poet who is the foremost among scholars and is also well-versed in all scriptures, and who even talks in extemporaneously composed poetry with Sanskrit scholars, usually in Upajāti metre. Rambhadracharya uses with great effect the Daṇḍaka style with Sanskrit adjectives in his speeches. Shastry recounts a use of a long sentence in the Daṇḍaka style at a speech in Jaipur in July 2003 by Rambhadracharya, in which one sentence with multiple adjectives lasted around seven minutes and was "replete with poetic beauty". Shastry writes that among Sanskrit poets, only Śrīharṣa (poet of Naiṣadhīyacaritam) has been described as having such wonderful command over Sanskrit as Rambhadracharya has.

Shastry critiqued the work Śrībhārgavarāghavīyam in the January 2003 issue of the Sanskrit monthly Bhāratī. Shastry writes that the work has poetic excellence, variety of meters and dexterity of language which has not been seen hitherto in Sanskrit epics. Shastry finds the twentieth canto of the epic to be an excellent illustration of Sanskrit poetry in Prakrit verses, a style which was pioneered by Shastry's father.

Dr. Brajesh Dikshit, Sanskrit scholar from Jabalpur, says that Śrībhārgavarāghavīyam combines the styles of three previous Sanskrit epics – it has two leading characters like in Bhāravi's Kirātārjunīyam, the poetic excellence and variety of prosodic metres is like in Śrīharṣa's Naiṣadhīyacaritam, while the length and extent of the work is like the Śiśupālavadham of Māgha.

Shastry also critiqued the work Bhṛṅgadūtam, about which he says that it has many new usages (Prayogas) not seen earlier in Sanskrit poetry. As per Shastry, new dimensions in Sanskrit literature are seen in the play Śrīrāghavābhyudayam where there are songs in the Gīti style, and Gītarāmāyaṇam which is an epic poem in the Gīti style of Gītagovindam by Jayadeva. Dikshit writes that Kubjāpatram is a revival of the letter-poem (Patrakāvya) genre in Sanskrit after 2000 years, and is the first work in Sanskrit literature whose lead character is disabled.

Shastry says that rhyme (Antyānuprāsa) is a distinguishing feature of Rambhadracharya's Sanskrit poetry. Shastry notes that another feature of Rambhadracharya's works is the devotion to motherland and patriotism, which is most evident in the poetic work Ājādacandraśekharacaritam on the life of Chandrashekhar Azad. Shastry says that this strong feeling of love towards motherland is reminiscent of old Sanskrit literature including Prithvi Sukta of Atharva Veda, various Puranas including Bhagavata Purana, and also in the Sanskrit works of Swami Bhagavadacharya, a former Jagadguru Ramanandacharya. Dikshit says that the nationalistic play Śrīrāghavābhyudayam establishes Rambhadracharya as a successful playwright at a young age. Dikshit praises the aesthetics of the work Śrīsītārāmakelikaumudī saying that it represents all the six Sampradāyas of Indian literature (Rīti, Rasa, Alaṅkāra, Dhvani, Vakrokti and Aucitya), and that it is a unique work of Rambhadracharya when it comes to figures of speech. Dikshit says that this work places Rambhadracharya in the league of Ritikavya poets like Raskhan, Keshavdas, Ghananand and Padmakar; but observes the distinction that while the works of all these poets are primarily in the Śṛngāra Rasa, Śrīsītārāmakelikaumudī is a work which has Vātsalya Rasa as the primary emotion, which is augmented by Śṛngāra Rasa.

Dinkar notes that in the poems of Rambhadracharya, the three poetical styles of Pāñcālī (secondary figurative sense with short and sweet-sounding compounds), Vaidarbhī (with compounds and soft contexts and without many figures of speech) and Lāṭī (with precise contexts and without many figures of speech) are dominant.

=== Overview ===
Rewa Prasad Dwivedi writes in his Sanskrit poem dedicated to Rambhadracharya that he is an encyclopedia of learning whose literature is like numerous Narmada rivers flowing out simultaneously, and in whose literary works Shiva and Parvati delight while performing Tandava and Lasya.

Devarshi Kala Nath Shastry writes in his review of Rambhadracharya's works that Rambhadracharya is an accomplished and eloquent poet who is the foremost among scholars and is also well-versed in all scriptures. Shastry writes that among Sanskrit poets, only Śrīharṣa (poet of Naiṣadhīyacaritam) has been described as having such wonderful command over Sanskrit as Rambhadracharya has.

==== Features ====
Shastry writes that Rambhadracharya even talks in extemporaneously composed poetry with Sanskrit scholars, usually in the Upajāti metre. Rambhadracharya uses with great effect the Daṇḍaka style with Sanskrit adjectives in his speeches. Shastry recounts a use of a long sentence in the Daṇḍaka style at a speech in Jaipur in July 2003 by Rambhadracharya, in which one sentence with multiple adjectives lasted around seven minutes and was "replete with poetic beauty".

Shastry says that rhyme (Antyānuprāsa) is a distinguishing feature of Rambhadracharya's Sanskrit poetry. Shastry notes that another feature of Rambhadracharya's works is the devotion to motherland and patriotism, which is most evident in the poetic work Ājādacandraśekharacaritam on the life of Chandrashekhar Azad. Shastry says that this strong feeling of love towards motherland is reminiscent of old Sanskrit literature including Prithvi Sukta of Atharva Veda, various Puranas including Bhagavata Purana, and also in the Sanskrit works of Swami Bhagavadacharya, a former Jagadguru Ramanandacharya.

Dinkar notes that in the poems of Rambhadracharya, the three poetical styles of Pāñcālī (secondary figurative sense with short and sweet-sounding compounds), Vaidarbhī (with compounds and soft contexts and without many figures of speech) and Lāṭī (with precise contexts and without many figures of speech) are dominant.

==== Rasas ====
The principal Rasa (emotion or mood) of Śrībhārgavarāghavīyam is the Vīra Rasa (the emotion of heroism). Like the previously composed Mahākāvyas, Śrībhārgavarāghavīyam has all the eight Rasas as enunciated by Bharata Muni. These Rasas are – Śringāra (eros and beauty), Vīra (heroism or bravery), Hāsya (mirth), Raudra (fury), Karuṇa (compassion), Bībhatsa (disgust), Bhayānaka (horror), Adbhuta (amazement). Apart from this Śrībhārgavarāghavīyam also has the ninth Rasa as propounded by Mammaṭa – the Śānta Rasa (calmness), and the three new Rasas as – Bhakti (devotion), Vatsala (parental love) and Preyas (love). The principle Rasas in the Ashtavakra (epic) are the Vīra and the Karuṇa. Like the 10th canto of Śrīmad Bhāgavatam and Bālakāṇḍa of the Rāmacaritamānasa, twelve verses in the seventeenth canto (17.42–17.53) of Śrībhārgavarāghavīyam have all the twelve Rasas used in the same context. While the pure Śṛngāra Rasa is the dominant Rasa in Bhṛṅgadūtam, Śrīsītārāmakelikaumudī is a work primarily of Vātsalya Rasa mixed with Śṛngāra Rasa. Rāghavagītaguñjana and Bhaktigītasudhā are works full of the Bhakti Rasa.

=== Styles of individual works ===
==== Śrībhārgavarāghavīyam ====
Shastry critiqued the work Śrībhārgavarāghavīyam in the January 2003 issue of the Sanskrit monthly Bhāratī. Shastry writes that the work has poetic excellence, variety of meters and dexterity of language which has not been seen hitherto in Sanskrit epics. Shastry finds the twentieth canto of the epic to be an excellent illustration of Sanskrit poetry in Prakrit verses, a style which was pioneered by Shastry's father, Bhatt Mathuranath Shastri. The 20th canto has 63 Sanskrit verses (20.1–20.63) composed in Prakrit metres, namely Kirīṭa (Meduradanta, a type of Sapādikā), Ghanākṣarī, Duramilā (Dvimilā, a type of Sapādikā), Mattagajendra (a type of Sapādikā), Śaṭpada and Harigītaka. The language of the verses in Sanskrit, but the metres and the prosody rules follow Prakrit prosody. An example is the following verse (20.13) in the Ghanākṣarī metre, which consists of 32 syllables in every foot.

Devanagari

अशरणशरण प्रणतभयदरण
धरणिभरहरण धरणितनयावरण
जनसुखकरण तरणिकुलभरण
कमलमृदुचरण द्विजाङ्गनासमुद्धरण ।
त्रिभुवनभरण दनुजकुलमरण
निशितशरशरण दलितदशमुखरण
भृगुभवचातकनवीनजलधर राम

विहर मनसि सह सीतया जनाभरण ॥

IAST

aśaraṇaśaraṇa praṇatabhayadaraṇa
dharaṇibharaharaṇa dharaṇitanayāvaraṇa
janasukhakaraṇa taraṇikulabharaṇa
kamalamṛducaraṇa dvijāṅganāsamuddharaṇa ।
tribhuvanabharaṇa danujakulamaraṇa
niśitaśaraśaraṇa dalitadaśamukharaṇa
bhṛgubhavacātakanavīnajaladhara rāma

vihara manasi saha sītayā janābharaṇa ॥

O the refuge of those without refuge, O the destroyer of the fear of those who bow down [to you], O the remover of the earth's burden, O the paramour of the daughter of the earth, O the cause of pleasure in devotees, O the nourisher of the dynasty of the sun, O the one with feet as delicate as the lotus, O the redeemer of the wife of the Brahmin (Ahalyā), O the nourisher of the three worlds, O the slayer of the clan of demons, O the bearer of sharp arrows, O the destroyer of Rāvaṇa in battle, O the new cloud for the Cātaka bird in the form of the descendant of Bhṛgu (Paraśurāma), O Rāma, O the ornament of devotees, take pleasure in my mind with Sītā. ॥ 20.13 ॥

Dr. Brajesh Dikshit, Sanskrit scholar from Jabalpur, says that Śrībhārgavarāghavīyam combines the styles of three previous Sanskrit epics - it has two leading characters like in Bhāravi's Kirātārjunīyam, the poetic excellence and variety of prosodic metres is like in Śrīharṣa's Naiṣadhīyacaritam, while the length and extent of the work is like the Śiśupālavadham of Māgha.

Abhiraj Rajendra Mishra, former Vice-Chancellor of Sampurnanand Sanskrit University wrote in the introduction to Śrībhārgavarāghavīyam that the epic nourishes the tradition of Ṛṣis, and with this composition the contemporary Sanskrit literature has been blessed.

==== Śrīrāghavakṛpābhāṣyam ====
Dr. Shivram Sharma, Sanskrit scholar from Varanasi, writes in his review of Śrīrāghavakṛpābhāṣyam on the eleven Upanishads that it is replete with novel thoughts and Sanskrit derivations, and that Rambhadracharya has shown Rama as the Pratipādya of the all Upanishads by the wonderful dexterity of Vyutpattis of Sanskrit words. Sharma adds that the style of interspersed Sanskrit translations of the works of Tulsidas further enhances the literary merit of the work. Dr. Vishnu Dutt Rakesh, Hindi professor and author from Haridwar, says that the Śrīrāghavakṛpābhāṣyam on Bhagavad Gita has the broadest coverage of all Sanskrit commentaries on Gita with "convincing discussion, propounding of theories with evidence, contradiction of others, creative genius and an independent style of composition". Dikshit says that the Śrīrāghavakṛpābhāṣyam on the Prasthānatrayī is formidable and adorns the Ramananda tradition with greatness. He adds that the Śrīrāghavakṛpābhāṣyam on Narada Bhakti Sutra and Śrīrāmastavarājastotram are successful in establishing the five Prasthānas in place of the three Prasthānas of Prasthānatrayī. Dr. Ram Chandra Prasad, author of bilingual English and Hindi commentaries on the Ramcharitmanas, says that the Mahavīrī commentary is "adorned with erudition" and considers it to be "the best exposition of Hanuman Chalisa."

==== Other works ====
Kalika Prasad Shukla was one of the examiners of the PhD dissertation of Rambhadracharya (then known as Giridhar Mishra) in 1981. After examining his Sanskrit thesis titled Adhyātmarāmāyaṇe Apāṇinīyaprayogānāṃ Vimarśaḥ (Deliberation on the non-Paninian usages in the Adhyatma Ramayana), he wrote a Sanskrit verse–

Devanagari

शोधप्रबन्धपरिशीलनतः समन्तात्
सञ्जायते मतमिदं मम युक्तियुक्तम् ।
शोधप्रबन्धमकरन्दमधुव्रतोऽयं

विद्वद्विमृग्यविरुदं लभतामिदानीम् ॥

IAST

śodhaprabandhapariśīlanataḥ samantāt
sañjāyate matamidaṃ mama yuktiyuktam ।
śodhaprabandhamakarandamadhuvrato'yaṃ

vidvadvimṛgyavirudaṃ labhatāmidānīm ॥

My logical conclusion, that arises from having completely examined the research, is that he (Giridhar Mishra) is the bumblebee for the honey in the form of research. May he now obtain the praise and fame which is sought after by the learned.

Kalanath Shastry also critiqued the work Bhṛṅgadūtam, about which he says that it has many new usages (Prayogas) not seen earlier in Sanskrit poetry. As per Shastry, new dimensions in Sanskrit literature are seen in the play Śrīrāghavābhyudayam where there are songs in the Gīti style, and Gītarāmāyaṇam which is an epic poem in the Gīti style of Gītagovindam by Jayadeva. Dikshit writes that Kubjāpatram is a revival of the letter-poem (Patrakāvya) genre in Sanskrit after 2000 years, and is the first work in Sanskrit literature whose lead character is disabled.

Dikshit is of the view that the eight Utprekṣā figures of speech in Śrīrāghavabhāvadarśanam have excelled the Utprekṣā style of the poet Karṇapūra, while the erudition and poetic skill displayed in Śrīsarayūlaharī makes the reader forget the Gaṅgālaharī of Paṇḍitarāja Jagannātha. He holds the work Arundhatī to be an eminent epic in Khariboli Hindi after the Kāmāyanī of Jaishankar Prasad. He observes that while Kāmāyanī goes from creation to optimism to pessimism and ends with indifference, Arundhatī is optimistic from beginning to end and establishes the virtues of Hinduism as enshrined in the Ramayana. About the lyrical Hindi works Rāghavagītaguñjana and Bhaktigītasudhā, Dikshit says that the works are steeped in Bhakti Rasa and are reminiscent of the works of Tulsidas, Surdas and Mirabai. On Bhaktigītasudhā, Shraddha Gupta writes that the work follows the Bhojpuri tradition where the sentimental and artistic aspects are both developed.

Dikshit says that the nationalistic play Śrīrāghavābhyudayam establishes Rambhadracharya as a successful playwright at a young age. Dikshit praises the aesthetics of the work Śrīsītārāmakelikaumudī saying that it represents all the six Sampradāyas of Indian literature (Rīti, Rasa, Alaṅkāra, Dhvani, Vakrokti and Aucitya), and that it is a unique work of Rambhadracharya when it comes to figures of speech. Dikshit says that this work places Rambhadracharya in the league of Ritikavya poets like Raskhan, Keshavdas, Ghananand and Padmakar; but observes the distinction that while the works of all these poets are primarily in the Śṛngāra Rasa, Śrīsītārāmakelikaumudī is a work which has Vātsalya Rasa as the primary emotion, which is augmented by Śṛngāra Rasa.

== Recognition, awards and honours ==
=== Recognition ===
Recognition in India

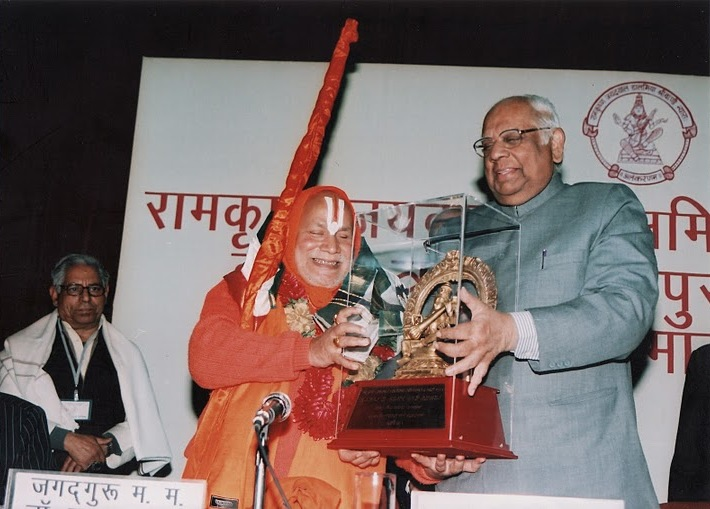
Rambhadracharya (left) being presented the Vani Alankarana Puraskara by Somnath Chatterjee (right) in 2006

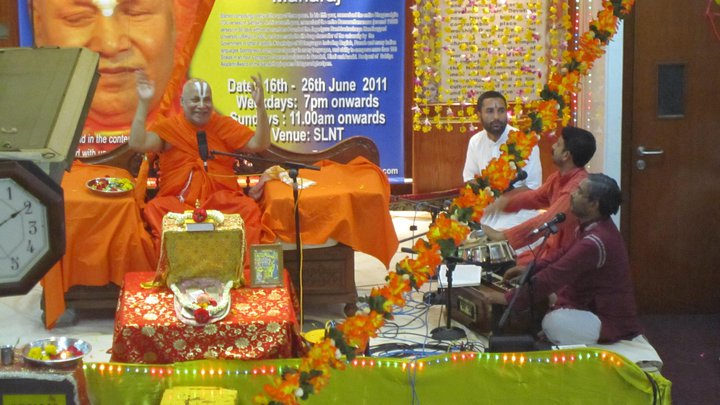
Rambhadracharya's katha on Ramcharitmanas in June 2011 at Shree Lakshmi Narayan Temple, Singapore.

Rambhadracharya is widely popular in Chitrakoot. Atal Bihari Vajpayee considered Rambhadracharya to be an "immensely learned person well versed in Vedic and Puranic literature besides the grammar", and commended his intelligence and memory. Dr. Murli Manohar Joshi said of Rambhadracharya that the "intense knowledge of the most revered is indeed adorable". Nanaji Deshmukh called Rambhadracharya "an astonishing gem of the country". Swami Kalyandev considered Rambhadracharya to be "an unprecedented intellectual and speaker, and an Acharya with great devotion". Somnath Chatterjee called him a "celebrated Sanskrit scholar and educationist of great merit and achievement". He is considered one of the greatest scholars on Tulsidas and Ramcharitmanas in India, and is cited as such. Ram Prakash Gupta and Keshari Nath Tripathi have stated that Rambhadracharya has enriched society with his contributions and will continue to do so. Swami Ramdev considers Rambhadracharya to be the most learned person in the world at present. Rambhadracharya was a member of a delegation of saints and Dharmacharyas which met the then president A.P.J. Abdul Kalam and the then union Home Minister Shivraj Patil in July 2005 to hand over a memorandum urging to strengthen the security arrangements for important religious places in the country. Abhiraj Rajendra Mishra said that Rambhadracharya is of a high-mind, has a stupendous grip on the Indian literature, and "his soul feels the true pleasure in serving oppressed disabled people". Mata Prasad Pandey, the Speaker of Uttar Pradesh Legislative Assembly, said that Rambhadracharya has opened a door of development for those with disabilities in India, and that he has achieved what eminent industrialists and the government cannot do. Energy Minister of State (Independent Charge) of Uttar Pradesh Vijay Mishra termed Rambhadracharya as "most revered", whereas Uttar Pradesh's Secondary Education Minister of State Vijay Bahadur Pal called him the "chancellor of the utterly unique handicapped university." Rambhadracharya is also a member of the 51-members Akhil Bharatiya Sant Ucchadhikar Samiti (Empowered Committee of the All India Saints). In November 2014, Rambhadracharya was one of the nine people nominated by the Indian Prime Minister Narendra Modi for the Clean India Campaign. In September 2014, Rambhadracharya adopted five villages of Chitrakoot, with an aim to construct toilets in all the households. Rambhadracharya was one of the guests in the inaugural International Yoga Day event in New Delhi.

International recognition

In 1992 Rambhadracharya led the Indian delegation at the Ninth World Conference on Ramayana, held in Indonesia. He has travelled to several countries, including England, Mauritius, Singapore, and the United States to deliver discourses on Hindu religion and peace. He has been profiled in the International Who's Who of Intellectuals. He was also one of the key figures of the Dharma Prachar Yatra at Detroit.

Address at Millennium World Peace Summit

Rambhadracharya was one of the spiritual and religious Gurus from India at the Millennium World Peace Summit, organised by the United Nations in New York City from 28 to 31 August 2000. While addressing the gathering, he gave Sanskrit definitions for the words Bharata (the ancient name of India) and Hindu, and touched upon the Nirguna and Saguna aspects of God. In his speech on Peace, he called for developed and developing nations to come together to strive for the eradication of poverty, the fight against terrorism, and nuclear disarmament. At the end of his speech, he recited the Shanti Mantra.

=== Awards and honours ===
In 2015, Rambhadracharya was awarded Padma Vibhushan, India's second highest civilian honour. Rambhadracharya has been honoured by several leaders and politicians, including A. P. J. Abdul Kalam, Somnath Chatterjee, Shilendra Kumar Singh, and Indira Gandhi. Several state governments, including that of Uttar Pradesh, Madhya Pradesh, and Himachal Pradesh have conferred honours on him. In 2021, he was also awarded with Kendra Sahitya Academy Fellowship. On 17 February 2024 Rambhadracharya was named a recipient (along with Gulzar) of the 58th Jnanpith Award (for 2023).

== See also ==
- Timeline of Rambhadracharya
- List of Hindu gurus and saints
- List of Sahitya Akademi Award winners for Sanskrit

== Works cited ==
- Agarwal, Sudhir J. (30 September 2010). "Consolidated Judgment in OOS No. 1 of 1989, OOS No. 3 of 1989, OOS No. 4 of 1989 & OOS No. 5 of 1989". Lucknow, Uttar Pradesh, India: Allahabad High Court (Lucknow Bench). Archived from the original on 27 August 2014.
- Aneja, Mukta (2005). "Shri Ram Bhadracharyaji – A Religious Head with a Vision". In Kaul, J. K.; Abraham, George (eds.). Abilities Redefined – Forty Life Stories of Courage And Accomplishment (PDF). Delhi, India: All India Confederation of the Blind. pp. 66–68. Archived from the original (PDF) on 3 September 2011.
- Bhuyan, Devajit (2002). Multiple Career Choices. New Delhi, India: Pustak Mahal. ISBN 978-81-223-0779-5.
- Chandra, R. (September 2008). "सम्मान और पुरस्कार" [Honours and Awards]. Kranti Bharat Samachar (in Hindi). 8 (11). Lucknow, Uttar Pradesh, India: Rajesh Chandra Pandey. RNI No. 2000, UPHIN 2638.
- Dinkar, Dr. Vagish (2008). श्रीभार्गवराघवीयम् मीमांसा [Investigation into Śrībhārgavarāghavīyam] (in Hindi). Delhi, India: Deshbharti Prakashan. ISBN 978-81-908276-6-9.
- Dwivedi, Hazari Prasad (2007) [August 1981]. Dwivedi, Mukund (ed.). हज़ारी प्रसाद द्विवेदी ग्रन्थावली ३ [The Complete Works of Hazari Prasad Dwivedi Volume 3] (in Hindi) (3rd corrected and extended ed.). New Delhi: Rajkamal. ISBN 978-81-267-1358-5.
- Dwivedi, Gyanendra Kumar (2008). Analysis and Design of Algorithm. New Delhi, India: Laxmi Publications. ISBN 978-81-318-0116-1.
- Gupta, Amita; Kumar, Ashish (6 July 2006). Handbook of Universities. New Delhi, India: Atlantic Publishers and Distributors. ISBN 978-81-269-0608-6.
- Lochtefeld, James G. (2001). The Illustrated Encyclopedia of Hinduism: N-Z. New York City, USA: Rosen Publishing Group. ISBN 978-0-8239-3180-4.
- Macfie, J. M. (2004). "Preface". The Ramayan of Tulsidas or the Bible of Northern India. Whitefish, Montana, USA: Kessinger. ISBN 978-1-4179-1498-2.
- Mishra, Gita Devi (August 2011). Sushil, Surendra Sharma (ed.). "पूज्यपाद जगद्गुरु जी को तुलसी एवार्ड २०११" [Tulsi Award 2011 to Honorable Jagadguru]. Shri Tulsi Peeth Saurabh (in Hindi). 15 (3). Ghaziabad, Uttar Pradesh, India: Shri Tulsi Peeth Seva Nyas.
- Nagar, Shanti Lal (2002). Sharma, Acharya Divakar; Goyal, Siva Kumar; Sushil, Surendra Sharma (eds.). The Holy Journey of a Divine Saint: Being the English Rendering of Swarnayatra Abhinandan Granth (First, Hardback ed.). New Delhi, India: B. R. Publishing Corporation. ISBN 81-7646-288-8.
- Pandey, Ram Ganesh (2008) [First edition 2003]. तुलसी जन्म भूमि: शोध समीक्षा [The Birthplace of Tulasidasa: Investigative Research] (in Hindi) (Corrected and extended ed.). Chitrakoot, Uttar Pradesh, India: Bharati Bhavan Publication.
- Poddar, Hanuman Prasad (1996). Dohāvalī (in Hindi). Gorakhpur, Uttar Pradesh, India: Gita Press.
- Prasad, Ram Chandra (1999) [First published 1991]. Sri Ramacaritamanasa The Holy Lake of the Acts of Rama (Illustrated, reprint ed.). Delhi, India: Motilal Banarsidass. ISBN 81-208-0762-6.
- Rambhadracharya, Jagadguru, ed. (30 March 2006). श्रीरामचरितमानस – मूल गुटका (तुलसीपीठ संस्करण) [Śrīrāmacaritamānasa – Original Text (Tulasīpīṭha edition)] (in Hindi) (4th ed.). Chitrakoot, Uttar Pradesh, India: Jagadguru Rambhadracharya Handicapped University.
- Rambhadracharya, Svami (14 January 2010). Aṣṭāvakra Mahākāvya [The Epic Aṣṭāvakra] (PDF) (in Hindi). Chitrakuta, Uttar Pradesh, India: Jagadguru Rambhadracharya Handicapped University. Archived from the original (PDF) on 4 March 2016.
- Rambhadracharya, Svami (30 October 2002). Śrībhārgavarāghavīyam (Saṃskṛtamahākāvyam) [Śrībhārgavarāghavīyam (An epic Sanskrit poem)] (in Sanskrit). Chitrakuta, Uttar Pradesh, India: Jagadguru Rambhadracharya Handicapped University.
- Sharma, Dharam Veer (30 September 2010). "Judgment in OOS No. 4 of 1989". Lucknow, Uttar Pradesh, India: Allahabad High Court (Lucknow Bench). Archived from the original on 27 August 2014.
- Sharma, Dharam Veer (30 September 2010). "Annexure V". Lucknow, Uttar Pradesh, India: Allahabad High Court (Lucknow Bench). Archived from the original on 27 August 2014.
- Sharma, Acharya Divakar; Sushil, Surendra Sharma; Shrivastav, Dr. Vandana, eds. (14 January 2011). षष्टिपूर्ति (अभिनन्दनग्रन्थ) [Completion of 60 years (Felicitation Book)] (in Hindi). Ghaziabad, Uttar Pradesh, India: Tulsi Mandal. ISBN 978-81-923856-0-0.
- Sushil, Surendra Sharma; Mishra, Abhiraj Rajendra (February 2011). Sushil, Surendra Sharma (ed.). "गीतरामायणप्रशस्तिः" [Praise of Gītarāmāyaṇam]. Shri Tulsi Peeth Saurabh (in Hindi). 14 (9). Ghaziabad, Uttar Pradesh, India: Shri Tulsi Peeth Seva Nyas.
- Tripathi, Radhavallabh; Shukla, Ramakant; Tripathi, Ramakant; Singh Dev, Dharmendra Kumar, eds. (2012). आधुनिकसंस्कृतसाहित्यसन्दर्भसूची – लोकप्रियसाहित्यग्रन्थमाला ४४ [A Bibliography of Modern Sanskrit Writings] (PDF) (in Sanskrit). New Delhi, India: Rashtriya Sanskrit Sansthan. ISBN 978-93-86111-89-0. Archived from the original (PDF) on 2 May 2013.

Awards
Preceded by Kala Nath Shastry	Recipient of the Sahitya Akademi Award winners for Sanskrit; 2005	Succeeded by Harshadev Madhav
Preceded by Bhaskaracharya Tripathi	Recipient of the Vachaspati Award; 2007	Succeeded by Harinarayan Dixit
