= Abhiraj Rajendra Mishra =

Indian Sanskrit author and poet (born 1943)

Abhiraj Rajendra Mishra (born 1943) is a Sanskrit author, poet, lyricist, playwright and a former Vice-Chancellor of the Sampurnanand Sanskrit University, Varanasi.

He is the recipient of India's highly prestigious award Padma Shri 2020 for his work in the field of literature and education.

== Personal life ==
He was born in Dronipur in Jaunpur district in Uttar Pradesh, to Pandit Durgaprasad Mishra and Abhiraji Devi. His Dīkṣā Guru is Jagadguru Rāmabhadrācārya, whose epic poem Gītarāmāyaṇam was released by him on 14 January 2011.

== Career ==
He has served as the head of department of Sanskrit in Himachal Pradesh University, Shimla. He has also been a visiting professor at the University of Indonesia, the oldest university of Indonesia.

Abhiraj Rajendra Mishra is the winner of Sahitya Akademi Award for Sanskrit for the year 1988. He is popularly known as Triveṇī Kavi. He has composed many books in Sanskrit, Hindi, English and Bhojpuri.

After retirement, he settled in Shimla, Himachal Pradesh.

== Works ==
His works include:

- Ikshugandha
- Aranyani
- Abhiraja-Yasobhushanam
- Dhara-Mandaviyam
- Janaki-Jivanam
- Madhuparni
- Samskrit Sahitya Mein Anyokti
- Sapta-Dhara
- Poetry and Poetics
- Abhiraja-Sahasrakam
- Natya-Panchagavyam
- Natya-Panchamritam
- Vag-Vadhuti
- Mridvika
- Srutimbhara
- Bali-Dvipe Bharatiya Samskritih
- Vimsa-Satabdi-Samskrita-Kavyamritam (ed.)
- Sejarah Kesusatraan Sanskerta (History of Sanskrit in Bahasa Indonesia)
- Suvarna-Dvipiya Rama-Katha
- Samskrita-Satakam

== Awards and honours ==
- Sahitya Akademi Award for Sanskrit in 1988 for his collection of short stories Ikshugandha.
- Certificate of Honour from the President of India in 2002.
- Valmiki Samman
- Vachaspati Samman
- Vishva Bharati Samman by Uttar Pradesh Sanskrit Sansthan
- Sahitya Akademi Translation Prize 2013.
