= Shriraghavakripabhashyam =

Series of Sanskrit commentaries by Rambhadracharya (1988)

Śrīrāghavakṛpābhāṣyam
- Śrībrahmasūtreṣu Śrīrāghavakṛpābhāṣyam; Śrīmadbhagavadgītāsu Śrīrāghavakṛpābhāṣyam; Kaṭhopaniṣadi Śrīrāghavakṛpābhāṣyam; Kenopaniṣadi Śrīrāghavakṛpābhāṣyam; Māṇḍūkyopaniṣadi Śrīrāghavakṛpābhāṣyam; Iśāvāsyopaniṣadi Śrīrāghavakṛpābhāṣyam; Praśnopaniṣadi Śrīrāghavakṛpābhāṣyam; Taittirīyopaniṣadi Śrīrāghavakṛpābhāṣyam; Aitareyopaniṣadi Śrīrāghavakṛpābhāṣyam; Śvetāsvataropaniṣadi Śrīrāghavakṛpābhāṣyam; Chāndogyopaniṣadi Śrīrāghavakṛpābhāṣyam; Bṛhadāraṇyakopaniṣadi Śrīrāghavakṛpābhāṣyam; Muṇḍakopaniṣadi Śrīrāghavakṛpābhāṣyam
- Author: Rambhadracharya
- Original title: श्रीराघवकृपाभाष्यम्
- Country: India
- Language: Sanskrit
- Publisher: Shri Tulsi Peeth Seva Nyas
- Published: 1998
- No. of books: 13

Śrīrāghavakṛpābhāṣyam (Sanskrit: श्रीराघवकृपाभाष्यम्) is a series of Sanskrit commentaries on the Prasthanatrayi (the Brahma Sutra, the Bhagavad Gita, and eleven Upanishads), authored by Rambhadracharya. These commentaries were released on 10 April 1998 by the then Prime Minister of India, Atal Bihari Vajpayee. Rambhadracharya composed a commentary on Narada Bhakti Sutra in 1991, and thus revived the tradition of Sanskrit commentaries on the Prasthanatrayi after five hundred years. This was also the second commentary of the Ramananda Sampradaya on Prasthanatrayi, the first being the Ānandabhāṣyam, composed by Ramananda himself. These commentaries were published by Shri Tulsi Peeth Seva Nyas. The author won the Rajshekhar Samman from the Madhya Pradesh Sanskrit Academy, Bhopal, for the commentaries.

== Reviews ==
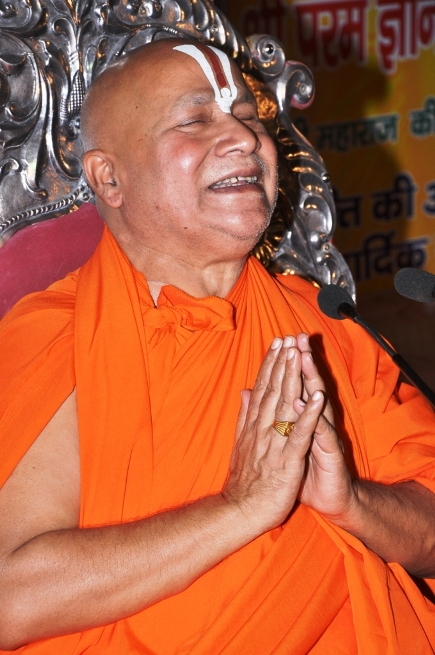
Jagadguru Ramanandacharya Swami Rambhadracharya

Dr. Shivram Sharma, a Sanskrit scholar from Varanasi, wrote in his review of Śrīrāghavakṛpābhāṣyam on the eleven Upanishads that it is replete with novel thoughts and Sanskrit derivations, and that Rambhadracharya has shown Rama as the Pratipādya of the all Upanishads by the wonderful dexterity of Vyutpattis of Sanskrit words. Sharma adds that the style of interspersed Sanskrit translations of the works of Tulsidas further enhances the literary merit of the work. Dr. Vishnu Dutt Rakesh, a Hindi professor and author from Haridwar, said that the Śrīrāghavakṛpābhāṣyam on Bhagavad Gita has the broadest coverage of all Sanskrit commentaries on Gita with "convincing discussion, propounding of theories with evidence, contradiction of others, creative genius and an independent style of composition". Dr. Brajesh Dikshit, Sanskrit scholar from Jabalpur, said that the Śrīrāghavakṛpābhāṣyam on the Prasthānatrayī is formidable and adorns the Ramananda tradition with greatness. He added that the Śrīrāghavakṛpābhāṣyam on Narada Bhakti Sutra and Śrīrāmastavarājastotram are successful in establishing the five Prasthānas in place of the three Prasthānas of Prasthānatrayī.

== Philosophy ==
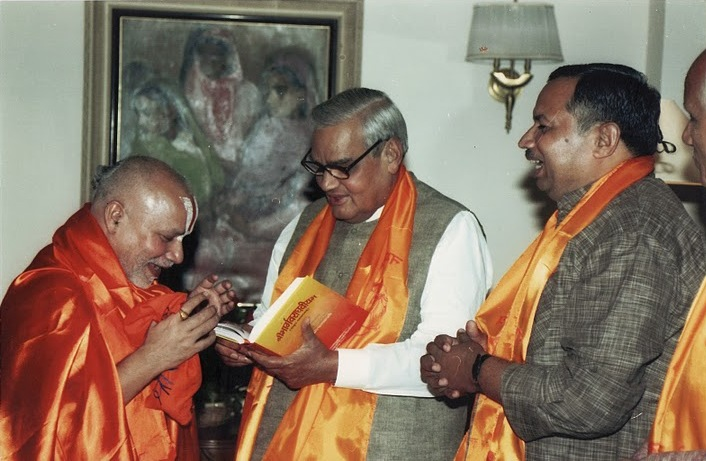
Śrībhārgavarāghaviyam being released by Atal Bihari Vajpayee (centre) in 2002. Rambhadracharya is to the left.

Rakesh said that the works follow the Ramananda branch of Vishishtadvaita school. There is a fierce contradiction of Advaita school of Vedanta, which is characterized with a "bold declaration" by the commentator at the beginning of the commentary on Bhagavad Gita:

न कोऽपि जातो जगतीतलेऽस्मिन् प्रपीतवान् स्फीतपयो जनन्याः ।
यो ब्रह्मजीवैक्यमतर्कबुद्ध्या संसाधयेत्तिष्ठति रामभद्रे ॥
na ko'pi jāto jagatītale'smin prapītavān sphītapayo jananyāḥ ।
yo brahmajīvaikyamatarkabuddhyā saṁsādhayettiṣṭhati rāmabhadre ॥

There is nobody born in this world and well nourished by the abundant milk of the mother, who can irrationally prove the equality of the Brahman and the Jīva in the presence of Rāmabhadra (Rambhadracharya).

The commentator reiterates the challenge in the Hindi poetic translation of the above verse:

संसार में किसने जननि का दूध गाढ़ा है पिया
किसने स्वगुरु के प्रेम से सच्ची लँगोटी है लिया ।
जो कर सके अद्वैत साधन ऋण चुका स्वाचार्य के
वेदान्त बुद्धि विशुद्ध रहते रामभद्राचार्य के ॥
saṁsāra meँ kisane janani kā dūdha gāṛhā hai piyā
kisane svaguru ke prema se saccī laँgoṭī hai liyā ।
jo kara sake advaita sādhana ṛṇa cukā svācārya ke
vedānta buddhi viśuddha rahate rāmabhadrācārya ke ॥

Is there anybody in the world having drunk the dense milk of the mother and having taken true Saṁnyāsa with the love of the Guru, who can repay the debts of their Guru by proving [the theory of] Advaita in the presence of Rambhadracharya whose Vedānta intellect is especially pure?

== Works cited ==
- Dinkar, Dr. Vagish (2008). श्रीभार्गवराघवीयम् मीमांसा [Investigation into Śrībhārgavarāghavīyam] (in Hindi). Delhi, India: Deshbharti Prakashan. ISBN 9788190827669.
- Dwivedi, Hazari Prasad (2007) [August 1981]. Dwivedi, Mukund (ed.). हज़ारी प्रसाद द्विवेदी ग्रन्थावली ३ [The Complete Works of Hazari Prasad Dwivedi Volume 3] (in Hindi) (3rd corrected and extended ed.). New Delhi: Rajkamal. ISBN 978-81-267-1358-5.
- Nagar, Shanti Lal (2002). Sharma, Acharya Divakar; Goyal, Siva Kumar; Sushil, Surendra Sharma (eds.). The Holy Journey of a Divine Saint: Being the English Rendering of Swarnayatra Abhinandan Granth (First, Hardback ed.). New Delhi, India: B. R. Publishing Corporation. ISBN 81-7646-288-8.
- Chandra, R. (September 2008). "सम्मान और पुरस्कार" [Honours and Awards]. Kranti Bharat Samachar (in Hindi). 8 (11). Lucknow, Uttar Pradesh, India: Rajesh Chandra Pandey. RNI No. 2000, UPHIN 2638.
