= Shrisitaramasuprabhatam =

श्रीसीतारामसुप्रभातम्
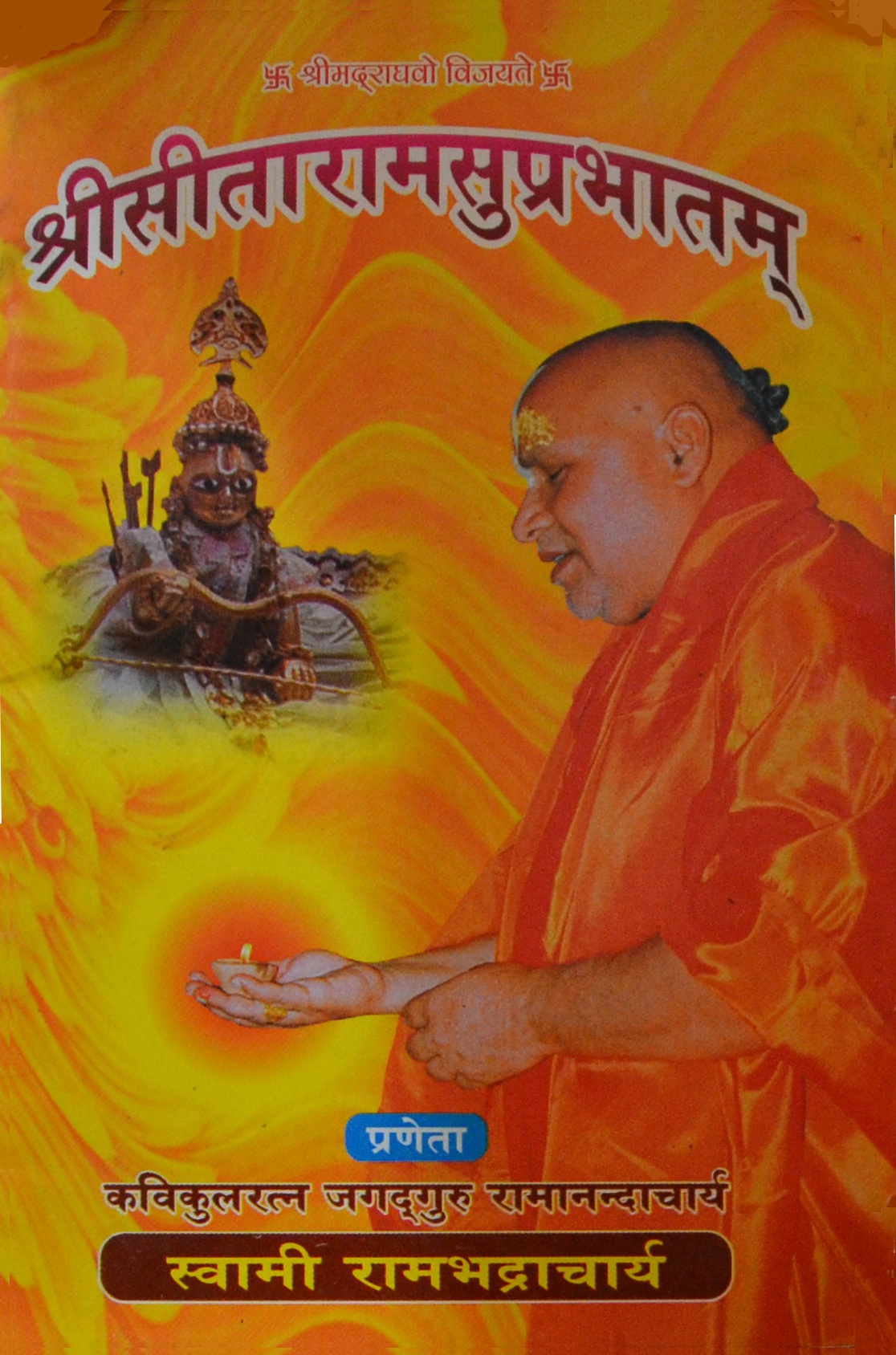
- Cover page of Śrīsītārāmasuprabhātam, first edition
- Author: Jagadguru Rambhadracharya
- Original title: Śrīsītārāmasuprabhātam
- Language: Sanskrit
- Publisher: Jagadguru Rambhadracharya Handicapped University
- Publication date: January 14, 2009
- Publication place: India
- Media type: Print (paperback)
- Pages: 26 pp (first edition)

Śrīsītārāmasuprabhātam (Sanskrit: श्रीसीतारामसुप्रभातम्) (2009), literally The beautiful dawn of Sītā and Rāma, is a Saṃskṛta minor poem (Khaṇḍakāvya) of the Suprabhātakāvya (dawn-poem) genre composed by shri Jagadguru Rambhadracharya in the year 2008. The poem consists of 43 verses in five different metres.

A copy of the poem, with a Hindi commentary by the poet himself, was published by the Jagadguru Rambhadracharya Vikalang Vishvavidyalaya, Chitrakuta, Uttar Pradesh. The book was released in Chitrakoot on the Makara Saṅkrānti day of January 14, 2009. The day was the 59th birthday of Jagadguru swami Rāmabhadrācārya. An audio CD of the composition sung by the poet himself in the Bairagi Rāga was released by Yuki Cassettes, New Delhi.

== Composition ==
The work was composed by Rāmabhadrācārya in the Āshvin Navarātra (September 30 to October 8) of 2008 when he was in Tirupati for a Kathā programme. In the prologue of the work, Rāmabhadrācārya says that the genre of Suprabhātakāvya began with a single verse (1.23.1) of Bālakāṇḍa in Vālmīki's Rāmāyaṇa.

Devanagari
कौसल्यासुप्रजा राम पूर्वा संध्या प्रवर्तते ।
उत्तिष्ठ नरशार्दूल कर्त्तव्यं दैवमाह्निकम् ॥

IAST
kausalyāsuprajā rāma pūrvā sandhyā pravartate ।
uttiṣṭha naraśārdūla karttavyaṃ daivamāhnikam ॥

O Rāma, the noble son of Kausalyā! The Sandhyā of the morning commences. O the lion amongst men! Arise, the Vedic daily tasks are to be performed. ॥ 1.23.2 ॥

The poet mentions the popularity of Veṅkaṭeśasuprabhātam for Veṅkaṭeśvara, and says that hitherto there was no extensive Suprabhātakāvya in praise of Rāma, which coupled with his stay at Tirupati, prompted him to compose the work.

== The poem ==
The work consists of 43 verses, of which 40 verses form the text of the Suprabhātam. In addition, there are two verses in the prologue (the first of which is the verse from Vālmīki' Rāmāyaṇa) and there is one verse in the epilogue which is the Phalaśruti. The Suprabhātam verses are composed in five metres -

- The two verses in the prologue are in the Anuṣṭup metre
- Verses 1 to 8 are in the Śārdūlavikrīḍita metre
- Verses 9 to 32 are in the Vasantatilakā metre. This is the metre usually used in the Suprabhātakāvya genre.
- Verses 33 to 36 are in the Sragdharā metre
- Verses 37 to 40 are in the Mālinī metre
- The Phalaśruti at the end is in the Vasantatilakā metre.

=== Text and Meaning ===
कौसल्यासुप्रजा राम पूर्वा संध्या प्रवर्तते ।
उत्तिष्ठ नरशार्दूल कर्त्तव्यं दैवमाह्निकम् ॥

kausalyāsuprajā rāma pūrvā saṃdhyā pravartate ।
uttiṣṭha naraśārdūla karttavyaṃ daivamāhnikam ॥

O Rāma, the noble son of Kausalyā! TheSandhyā of the morning commences. O the lion amongst men! Arise, the Vedic daily tasks are to be performed.॥

उत्तिष्ठोत्तिष्ठ भो राम उत्तिष्ठ राघव प्रभो ।
उत्तिष्ठ जानकीनाथ सर्वलोकं सुखीकुरु ॥

uttiṣṭhottiṣṭha bho rāma uttiṣṭha rāghava prabho ।
uttiṣṭha jānakīnātha sarvalokaṃ sukhīkuru ॥

O Rāma! Awake, awake. O the mighty descendent of Raghu! Awake. O the husband of Sītā! Awake. Make the whole world happy.॥

सीताराम जनाभिराम मघवल्लालाममञ्जुप्रभ
श्रीसाकेतपते पतत्त्रिपतिना नानार्चनैरर्चित ।
नित्यं लक्ष्मणभव्य भव्यभरतश्रीशत्रुभित्सन्नते
शंभूयात्तव सुप्रभातमनघं शार्दूलविक्रीडितम् ॥

sītārāma janābhirāma maghavallālāmamañjuprabha
śrīsāketapate patattripatinā nānārcanairarcita ।
nityaṃ lakṣmaṇabhavya bhavyabharataśrīśatrubhitsannate
śaṃbhūyāttava suprabhātamanaghaṃ śārdūlavikrīḍitam ॥

॥ 1 ॥

नीलाम्भोजरुचे चलाम्बरशुचे वन्दारुकल्पद्रुम
ध्येय ज्ञेय सतां यतीन्द्रयमिनां वात्सल्यवारान्निधे ।
शार्ङ्गामोघशिलीमुखेषुधियुत श्रीजानकीवल्लभ
प्रीत्यैस्तात् तव सुप्रभातमनघं हे रावणारे हरे ॥

nīlāmbhojaruce calāmbaraśuce vandārukalpadruma
dhyeya jñeya satāṃ yatīndrayamināṃ vātsalyavārānnidhe ।
śārṅgāmoghaśilīmukheṣudhiyuta śrījānakīvallabha
prītyaistāt tava suprabhātamanaghaṃ he rāvaṇāre hare ॥

॥ 2 ॥

मन्दं मन्दमवन् पवन् सुपवनः प्रालेयलेपापहृन्
माद्यन्मालयमालतीपरिमलो नद्यः शिवाः सिन्धवः ।
भूम्याम्भोहुतभुक्समीरगगनं कालो दिगात्मामनो
लोका वै ब्रुवते प्रसन्नमनसस्त्वत्सुप्रभातं हरे ॥

mandaṃ mandamavan pavan supavanaḥ prāleyalepāpahṛn
mādyanmālayamālatīparimalo nadyaḥ śivāḥ sindhavaḥ ।
bhūmyāmbhohutabhuksamīragaganaṃ kālo digātmāmano
lokā vai bruvate prasannamanasastvatsuprabhātaṃ hare ॥

॥ 3 ॥

वेदाः सुस्मृतयः समे मुनिवराः सप्तर्षिवर्या बुधाः
वाल्मीकिः सनकादयः सुयतयः श्रीनारदाद्या मुहुः ।
सन्ध्योपासनपुण्यपूतमनसो ज्ञानप्रभाभासुराः
सानन्दं ब्रुवते महीसुरवरास्त्वत्सुप्रभातं प्रभो ॥

vedāḥ susmṛtayaḥ same munivarāḥ saptarṣivaryā budhāḥ
vālmīkiḥ sanakādayaḥ suyatayaḥ śrīnāradādyā muhuḥ ।
sandhyopāsanapuṇyapūtamanaso jñānaprabhābhāsurāḥ
sānandaṃ bruvate mahīsuravarāstvatsuprabhātaṃ prabho ॥

॥ 4 ॥

विश्वामित्रमहावलेपजलधिप्रोद्यत्तपो वाडवो
ब्रह्माम्भोरुहरश्मिकेतुरनघो ब्रह्मर्षिवृन्दारकः ।
वेधःसूनुररुन्धतीपतिरसौ विज्ञो वसिष्ठो गुरुः
ब्रूते राघव सुप्रभातममलं सीतापते तावकम् ॥

viśvāmitramahāvalepajaladhiprodyattapo vāḍavo
brahmāmbhoruharaśmiketuranagho brahmarṣivṛndārakaḥ ।
vedhaḥsūnurarundhatīpatirasau vijño vasiṣṭho guruḥ
brūte rāghava suprabhātamamalaṃ sītāpate tāvakam ॥

॥ 5 ॥

विश्वामित्रघटोद्भवादिमुनयो राजर्षयो निर्मलाः
सिद्धाः श्रीकपिलादयः सुतपसो वाताम्बुपर्णाशनाः ।
प्रह्लादप्रमुखाश्च सात्वतवरा भक्ताः हनूमन्मुखाः
प्रीता गद्गदया गिराभिदधते त्वत्सुप्रभातं विभो ॥

viśvāmitraghaṭodbhavādimunayo rājarṣayo nirmalāḥ
siddhāḥ śrīkapilādayaḥ sutapaso vātāmbuparṇāśanāḥ ।
prahlādapramukhāśca sātvatavarā bhaktāḥ hanūmanmukhāḥ
prītā gadgadayā girābhidadhate tvatsuprabhātaṃ vibho ॥

॥ 6 ॥

सप्ताश्वो ननु भानुमान् स भगवानिन्दुर्द्विजानां पतिः
भौमः सौम्यबृहस्पती भृगुसुतो वैवस्वतो दारुणः ।
प्रह्लादस्वसृनन्दनोऽथ नवमः केतुश्च केतोर्नृणां
भाषन्ते च नवग्रहा ग्रहपते सत्सुप्रभातं तव ॥

saptāśvo nanu bhānumān sa bhagavānindurdvijānāṃ patiḥ
bhaumaḥ saumyabṛhaspatī bhṛgusuto vaivasvato dāruṇaḥ ।
prahlādasvasṛnandanoऽtha navamaḥ ketuśca ketornṛṇāṃ
bhāṣante ca navagrahā grahapate satsuprabhātaṃ tava ॥

॥ 7 ॥

कौसल्या ननु कैकयी च सरयू माता सुमित्रा मुदा
प्रेष्ठास्ते सचिवाः पिता दशरथः श्रीमत्ययोध्या पुरी ।
सुग्रीवप्रमुखा विभीषणयुताः श्रीचित्रकूटो गिरिः
सर्वे ते ब्रुवते सुवैष्णववराः श्रीसुप्रभातं प्रभो ॥

kausalyā nanu kaikayī ca sarayū mātā sumitrā mudā
preṣṭhāste sacivāḥ pitā daśarathaḥ śrīmatyayodhyā purī ।
sugrīvapramukhā vibhīṣaṇayutāḥ śrīcitrakūṭo giriḥ
sarve te bruvate suvaiṣṇavavarāḥ śrīsuprabhātaṃ prabho ॥

॥ 8 ॥

श्रीरामभद्रभवभावनभानुभानो
प्रोद्दण्डराक्षसमहावनरुट्कृशानो ।
वीरासनाश्रयमहीतलमण्डिजानो
सीतापते रघुपते तव सुप्रभातम् ॥

śrīrāmabhadrabhavabhāvanabhānubhāno
proddaṇḍarākṣasamahāvanaruṭkṛśāno ।
vīrāsanāśrayamahītalamaṇḍijāno
sītāpate raghupate tava suprabhātam ॥

॥ 9 ॥

श्रीरामचन्द्र चरणाश्रितपारिजात
प्रस्यन्दिकारुणि विलोचनवारिजात
राजाधिराज गुणवर्धितवातजात
श्रीश्रीपते रघुपते तव सुप्रभातम्

śrīrāmacandra caraṇāśritapārijāta
prasyandikāruṇi vilocanavārijāta
rājādhirāja guṇavardhitavātajāta
śrīśrīpate raghupate tava suprabhātam

॥ 10 ॥

श्रीराम रामशिव सुन्दरचक्रवर्तिन्
श्रीराम राम भवधर्मभवप्रवर्तिन्
श्रीराम रामनव नामनवानुवर्तिन्
श्रेयःपते रघुपते तव सुप्रभातम्

śrīrāma rāmaśiva sundaracakravartin
śrīrāma rāma bhavadharmabhavapravartin
śrīrāma rāmanava nāmanavānuvartin
śreyaḥpate raghupate tava suprabhātam

॥ 11 ॥

श्रीराम राघव रघूत्तम राघवेश
श्रीराम राघव रघूद्वह राघवेन्द्र
श्रीराम राघव रघूद्भव राघवेन्दो
श्रीभूपते रघुपते तव सुप्रभातम्

śrīrāma rāghava raghūttama rāghaveśa
śrīrāma rāghava raghūdvaha rāghavendra
śrīrāma rāghava raghūdbhava rāghavendo
śrībhūpate raghupate tava suprabhātam

॥ 12 ॥

श्रीराम रावणवनान्वयधूमकेतो
श्रीराम राघवगुणालयधर्मसेतो
श्रीराम राक्षसकुलामयमर्महेतो
श्रीसत्पते रघुपते तव सुप्रभातम्

śrīrāma rāvaṇavanānvayadhūmaketo
śrīrāma rāghavaguṇālayadharmaseto
śrīrāma rākṣasakulāmayamarmaheto
śrīsatpate raghupate tava suprabhātam

॥ 13 ॥

श्रीराम दाशरथ ईश्वर रामचन्द्र
श्रीराम कर्मपथतत्पर रामभद्र ।
श्रीराम धर्मरथमाध्वररम्यभद्र
श्रीमापते रघुपते तव सुप्रभातम् ॥

śrīrāma dāśaratha īśvara rāmacandra
śrīrāma karmapathatatpara rāmabhadra ।
śrīrāma dharmarathamādhvararamyabhadra
śrīmāpate raghupate tava suprabhātam ॥

॥ 14 ॥

श्रीराम माधव मनोभवदर्पहारिन्
श्रीराम माधव मनोभवसौख्यकारिन् ।
श्रीराम माधव मनोभवमोदधारिन्
श्रीशंपते रघुपते तव सुप्रभातम् ॥

śrīrāma mādhava manobhavadarpahārin
śrīrāma mādhava manobhavasaukhyakārin ।
śrīrāma mādhava manobhavamodadhārin
śrīśaṃpate raghupate tava suprabhātam ॥

॥ 15 ॥

श्रीराम तामरसलोचनशीलसिन्धो
श्रीराम काममदमोचन दीनबन्धो ।
श्रीराम रामरणरोचन दाक्षसान्धो
श्रीमत्पते रघुपते तव सुप्रभातम् ॥

śrīrāma tāmarasalocanaśīlasindho
śrīrāma kāmamadamocana dīnabandho ।
śrīrāma rāmaraṇarocana dākṣasāndho
śrīmatpate raghupate tava suprabhātam ॥

॥ 16 ॥

कौसल्यया प्रथममीक्षितमञ्जुमूर्तेः
श्रीश्रीपतेर्दशरथार्भकभावपूर्तेः
कोदण्डचण्डशरसर्जितशत्रुजूर्तेः
श्रीराम राघव हरे तव सुप्रभातम्

kausalyayā prathamamīkṣitamañjumūrteḥ
śrīśrīpaterdaśarathārbhakabhāvapūrteḥ
kodaṇḍacaṇḍaśarasarjitaśatrujūrteḥ
śrīrāma rāghava hare tava suprabhātam

॥ 17 ॥

नीलोत्पलाम्बुदतनोस्तरुणार्ककोटि-
द्युत्यम्बरस्य धरणीतनयावरस्य
कोदण्डदण्डदमिताध्वरजित्वरस्य
श्रीराम राघव हरे तव सुप्रभातम्

nīlotpalāmbudatanostaruṇārkakoṭi-
dyutyambarasya dharaṇītanayāvarasya
kodaṇḍadaṇḍadamitādhvarajitvarasya
śrīrāma rāghava hare tava suprabhātam

॥ 18 ॥

तातप्रियस्य मखकौशिकरक्षणस्य
श्रीवत्सकौस्तुभविलक्षणलक्षणस्य
धन्वीश्वरस्य गुणशीलविचक्षणस्य
श्रीराम राघव हरे तव सुप्रभातम्

tātapriyasya makhakauśikarakṣaṇasya
śrīvatsakaustubhavilakṣaṇalakṣaṇasya
dhanvīśvarasya guṇaśīlavicakṣaṇasya
śrīrāma rāghava hare tava suprabhātam

॥ 19 ॥

मारीचनीचपतिपर्वतवज्रबाहोः
सौकेतवीहन उदस्तवपुः सुबाहोः
विप्रेन्द्रदेवमुनिकष्टकलेशराहोः
श्रीराम राघव हरे तव सुप्रभातम्

mārīcanīcapatiparvatavajrabāhoḥ
sauketavīhana udastavapuḥ subāhoḥ
viprendradevamunikaṣṭakaleśarāhoḥ
śrīrāma rāghava hare tava suprabhātam

॥ 20 ॥

शापाग्निदग्धमुनिदारशिलोद्धराङ्घ्रेः
सीरध्वजाक्षिमधुलिड्वनरुड्वराङ्घ्रेः ।
कामारिविष्णुविधिवन्द्यमनोहराङ्घ्रेः
श्रीराम राघव हरे तव सुप्रभातम् ॥

śāpāgnidagdhamunidāraśiloddharāṅghreḥ
sīradhvajākṣimadhuliḍvanaruḍvarāṅghreḥ ।
kāmāriviṣṇuvidhivandyamanoharāṅghreḥ
śrīrāma rāghava hare tava suprabhātam ॥

॥ 21 ॥

कामारिकार्मुककदर्थनचुञ्चुदोष्णः
पेपीयमानमहिजावदनेन्दुयूष्णः ।
पादाब्जसेवकपयोरुहपूतपूष्णः
श्रीराम राघव हरे तव सुप्रभातम् ॥

kāmārikārmukakadarthanacuñcudoṣṇaḥ
pepīyamānamahijāvadanenduyūṣṇaḥ ।
pādābjasevakapayoruhapūtapūṣṇaḥ
śrīrāma rāghava hare tava suprabhātam ॥

॥ 22 ॥

देहप्रभाविजितमन्मथकोटिकान्तेः
कान्तालकस्य दयितादयितार्यदान्तेः ।
वन्यप्रियस्य मुनिमानससृष्टशान्तेः
श्रीराम राघव हरे तव सुप्रभातम् ॥

dehaprabhāvijitamanmathakoṭikānteḥ
kāntālakasya dayitādayitāryadānteḥ ।
vanyapriyasya munimānasasṛṣṭaśānteḥ
śrīrāma rāghava hare tava suprabhātam ॥

॥ 23 ॥

मायाहिरण्मयमृगाभ्यनुधावनस्य
प्रत्तात्मलोकशबरीखगपावनस्य ।
पौलस्त्यवंशबलवार्धिवनावनस्य
श्रीराम राघव हरे तव सुप्रभातम् ॥

māyāhiraṇmayamṛgābhyanudhāvanāsya
prattātmalokaśabarīkhagapāvanasya ।
paulastyavaṃśabalavārdhivanāvanasya
śrīrāma rāghava hare tava suprabhātam ॥

॥ 24 ॥

साकेतकेत कृतसज्जनहृन्निकेत
सीतासमेत समदिव्यगुणैरुपेत ।
श्रीराम कामरिपुपूतमनःसुकेत
श्रीसार्वभौमभगवंस्तव सुप्रभातम् ॥

sāketaketa kṛtasajjanahṛnniketa
sītāsameta samadivyaguṇairupeta ।
śrīrāma kāmaripupūtamanaḥsuketa
śrīsārvabhaumabhagavaṃstava suprabhātam ॥

॥ 25 ॥

सीताकराम्बुरुहलालितपादपद्म
सीतामुखाम्बुरुहलोचनचञ्चरीक ।
सीताहृदम्बुरुहरोचनरश्मिमालिन्
श्रीजानकीशभगवंस्तव सुप्रभातम् ॥

sītākarāmburuhalālitapādapadma
sītāmukhāmburuhalocanacañcarīka ।
sītāhṛdamburuharocanaraśmimālin
śrījānakīśabhagavaṃstava suprabhātam ॥

॥ 26 ॥

श्रीमैथिलीनयनचारुचकोरचन्द्र
श्रीस्वान्तशङ्करमहोरकिशोरचन्द्र ।
श्रीवैष्णवालिकुमुदेशकठोरचन्द्र
श्रीरामचन्द्रशभगवंस्तव सुप्रभातम् ॥

śrīmaithilīnayanacārucakoracandra
śrīsvāntaśaṅkaramahorakiśoracandra ।
śrīvaiṣṇavālikumudeśakaṭhoracandra
śrīrāmacandraśabhagavaṃstava suprabhātam ॥

॥ 27 ॥

श्रीकोसलाहृदयमालयमामयूख
प्रेमोल्लसज्जनकवत्सलवारिराशे ।
शत्रुघ्नलक्ष्मणभवद्भरतार्चिताङ्घ्रे
श्रीरामभद्रभगवंस्तव सुप्रभातम् ॥

śrīkosalāhṛdayamālayamāmayūkha
premollasajjanakavatsalavārirāśe ।
śatrughnalakṣmaṇabhavadbharatārcitāṅghre
śrīrāmabhadrabhagavaṃstava suprabhātam ॥

॥ 28 ॥

श्रीमद्वसिष्ठतनयापुलिने कुमारै-
राक्रीडतोऽत्र भवतो मनुजेन्द्रसूनोः ।
कोदण्डचण्डशरतूणयुगाप्तभासः
श्रीकोसलेन्द्रभगवंस्तव सुप्रभातम् ॥

śrīmadvasiṣṭhatanayāpuline kumārai-
rākrīḍatoऽtra bhavato manujendrasūnoḥ ।
kodaṇḍacaṇḍaśaratūṇayugāptabhāsaḥ
śrīkosalendrabhagavaṃstava suprabhātam ॥

॥ 29 ॥

नक्तंचरीकदन नन्दितगाधिसूनो
मारीचनीचसुभुजार्दनचण्डकाण्ड ।
कामारिकार्मुकविभन्जन जानकीश
श्रीराघवेन्द्रभगवंस्तव सुप्रभातम् ॥

naktaṃcarīkadana nanditagādhisūno
mārīcanīcasubhujārdanacaṇḍakāṇḍa ।
kāmārikārmukavibhanjana jānakīśa
śrīrāghavendrabhagavaṃstava suprabhātam ॥

॥ 30 ॥

गुर्वर्थमुज्झितसुरस्पृहराज्यलक्ष्मीः
सीतानुजानुगतविन्ध्यवनप्रवासिन् ।
पौरन्दरिप्रमदवारिधिवाडवाग्ने
श्रीपार्थिवेन्द्र भगवंस्तव सुप्रभातम् ॥

gurvarthamujjhitasuraspṛharājyalakṣmīḥ
sītānujānugatavindhyavanapravāsin ।
paurandaripramadavāridhivāḍavāgne
śrīpārthivendra bhagavaṃstava suprabhātam ॥

॥ 31 ॥

प्रोद्दण्डकाण्डहुतभुक्छलभीकृतारे
मारीचमर्दन जनार्दन जानकीश ।
पौलस्त्यवंशवनदारुणधूमकेतो
श्रीमानवेन्द्र भगवंस्तव सुप्रभातम् ॥

proddaṇḍakāṇḍahutabhukchalabhīkṛtāre
mārīcamardana janārdana jānakīśa ।
paulastyavaṃśavanadāruṇadhūmaketo
śrīmānavendra bhagavaṃstava suprabhātam ॥

॥ 32 ॥

कौसल्यागर्भदुग्धोदधिविमलविधो सर्वसौन्दर्यसीमन्
प्रोन्मीलन्मञ्जुकञ्जारुणनवनयनव्रीडितानेककाम ।
कन्दश्यामाभिरामप्रथितदशरथब्रह्मविद्याविलासिन्
भूयात्त्वत्सुप्रभातं भवभयशमनं श्रीहरे ताटकारे ॥

kausalyāgarbhadugdhodadhivimalavidho sarvasaundaryasīman
pronmīlanmañjukañjāruṇanavanayanavrīḍitānekakāma ।
kandaśyāmābhirāmaprathitadaśarathabrahmavidyāvilāsin
bhūyāttvatsuprabhātaṃ bhavabhayaśamanaṃ śrīhare tāṭakāre ॥

॥ 33 ॥

विश्वामित्राध्वरारिप्रबलखलकुलध्वान्तबालार्करूप
ब्रह्मस्त्रीशापतापत्रितयकदनकृत्पादपाथोज राम ।
भूतेशेष्वासखण्डिन्भृगुवरमदहृन्मैथिलानन्दकारिन्
सीतापाणिग्रहेष्ट प्रभवतु भवतो मङ्गलं सुप्रभातम् ॥

viśvāmitrādhvarāriprabalakhalakuladhvāntabālārkarūpa
brahmastrīśāpatāpatritayakadanakṛtpādapāthoja rāma ।
bhūteśeṣvāsakhaṇḍinbhṛguvaramadahṛnmaithilānandakārin
sītāpāṇigraheṣṭa prabhavatu bhavato maṅgalaṃ suprabhātam ॥

॥ 34 ॥

विभ्राणामोघबाणं धनुरिषुधियुगं पीतवल्कं वसान
त्यक्त्वायोध्यामरण्यं प्रमुदितहृदयन् मैथिलीलक्ष्मणाभ्याम् ।
राजच्छ्रीचित्रकूट प्रदमितहरिभूर्दूषणघ्नः खरारे-
र्भूयाद्भग्नत्रिमूर्ध्न स्तव भवजनुषां श्रेयसे सुप्रभातम् ॥

vibhrāṇāmoghabāṇaṃ dhanuriṣudhiyugaṃ pītavalkaṃ vasāna
tyaktvāyodhyāmaraṇyaṃ pramuditahṛdayan maithilīlakṣmaṇābhyām ।
rājacchrīcitrakūṭa pradamitaharibhūrdūṣaṇaghnaḥ kharāre-
rbhūyādbhagnatrimūrdhna stava bhavajanuṣāṃ śreyase suprabhātam ॥

॥ 35 ॥

मायैणघ्नो जटायुःशवरिसुगतिदस्तुष्टवातेर्विधातु
सुग्रीवं मित्रमेकाशुगनिहतपतद्वालिनो बद्ध सिन्धोः ।
लङ्कातङ्कैकहेतोः कपिकटकभृतो जाम्बवन्मुख्यवीरै-
र्हत्वा युद्धे दशास्यं स्वनगरमवतः सुप्राभातं प्रभो ते ॥

māyaiṇaghno jaṭāyuḥśavarisugatidastuṣṭavātervidhātu
sugrīvaṃ mitramekāśuganihatapatadvālino baddha sindhoḥ ।
laṅkātaṅkaikahetoḥ kapikaṭakabhṛto jāmbavanmukhyavīrai-
rhatvā yuddhe daśāsyaṃ svanagaramavataḥ suprābhātaṃ prabho te ॥

॥ 36 ॥

कलितकनकमौलेर्वामभागस्थसीता-
ननवनजदृगालेः स्वर्णसिंहासनस्थः ।
हनुमदनघभक्तेः सर्वलोकाधिपस्य
प्रथयति जगतेदद्राम ते सुप्रभातम् ॥

kalitakanakamaulervāmabhāgasthasītā-
nanavanajadṛgāleḥ svarṇasiṃhāsanasthaḥ ।
hanumadanaghabhakteḥ sarvalokādhipasya
prathayati jagatedadrāma te suprabhātam ॥

॥ 37 ॥

दिनकरकुलकेतो श्रौतसेतुत्रहेतो
दशरथनृपयागापूर्व दुष्टाब्धिकौर्व ।
अवनिदुहितृभर्तुश्चित्रकूटविहर्तु-
स्त्रिभुवनमभिधत्ते राम ते सुप्रभातम् ॥

dinakarakulaketo śrautasetutraheto
daśarathanṛpayāgāpūrva duṣṭābdhikaurva ।
avaniduhitṛbhartuścitrakūṭavihartu-
stribhuvanamabhidhatte rāma te suprabhātam ॥

॥ 38 ॥

सकलभुवनपाला लोकपाला नृपालाः
सुरमुनिनरनागाः सिद्धगन्धर्वमुख्याः ।
कृतविविधसपर्या राम राजाधिराज
प्रगृणत इम ईड्यं सुप्रभातं प्रभाते ॥

sakalabhuvanapālā lokapālā nṛpālāḥ
suramuninaranāgāḥ siddhagandharvamukhyāḥ ।
kṛtavividhasaparyā rāma rājādhirāja
pragṛṇata ima īḍyaṃ suprabhātaṃ prabhāte ॥

॥ 39 ॥

अनिशममलभक्त्या गीतसीताभिरामो
दशदिशमभि सीतावत्सलाम्बोधिचन्द्रः ।
हृदयहरिनिवासोऽप्युत्तरारण्यवासः
प्रणिगदति हनूमान् राम ते सुप्रभातम् ॥

aniśamamalabhaktyā gītasītābhirāmo
daśadiśamabhi sītāvatsalāmbodhicandraḥ ।
hṛdayaharinivāso’pyuttarāraṇyavāsaḥ
praṇigadati hanūmān rāma te suprabhātam ॥

॥ 40 ॥

श्रीश्रीनिवाससविधे तदनुज्ञया वै
सीतापतेर्हरिपदाम्बुजचिन्तकेन ।
गीतं मया गिरिधरेण हि रामभद्रा-
चार्येण भद्रमभिशंसतु सुप्रभातम् ॥

śrīśrīnivāsasavidhe tadanujñayā vai
sītāpaterharipadāmbujacintakena ।
gītaṃ mayā giridhareṇa hi rāmabhadrā-
cāryeṇa bhadramabhiśaṃsatu suprabhātam ॥

॥ 41 ॥
