= Bhringadutam =

भृङ्गदूतम्
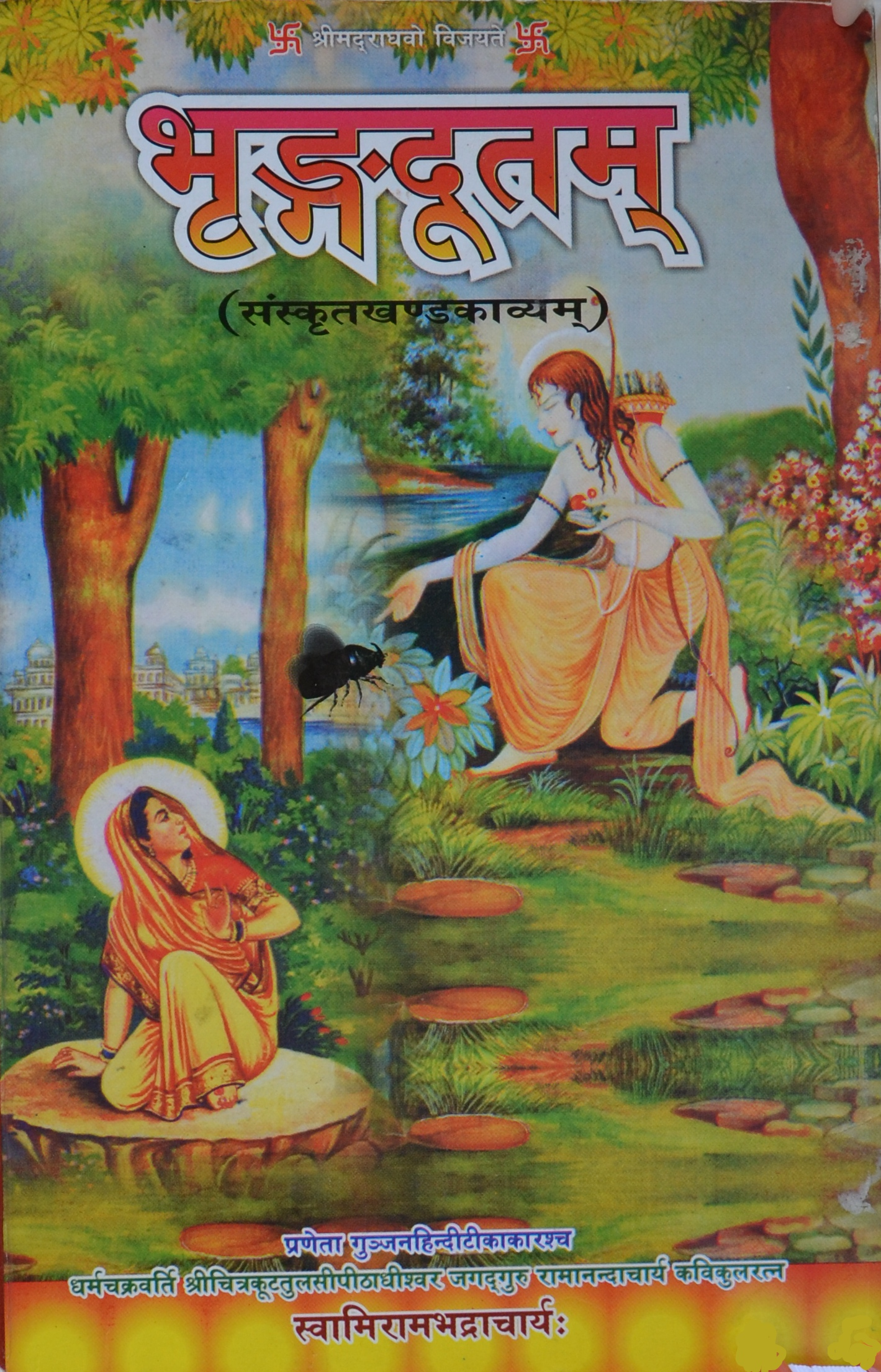
- Cover page of Bhṛṅgadūtam, first edition
- Author: Jagadguru Rambhadracharya
- Original title: Bhṛṅgadūtam
- Language: Sanskrit
- Genre: Dūtakāvya (Messenger Poetry)
- Publisher: Jagadguru Rambhadracharya Handicapped University
- Publication date: 30 August 2004
- Publication place: India
- Media type: Print (Paperback)
- Pages: 197 pp (first edition)

Bhṛṅgadūtam (Sanskrit: भृङ्गदूतम्) (2004), literally The bumblebee messenger, is a Sanskrit minor poem (Khaṇḍakāvya) of the Dūtakāvya (messenger-poem) genre composed by Jagadguru Rambhadracharya (1950–). The poem consists of 501 verses in the Mandākrāntā metre divided in two parts. Set in the context of the Kiṣkindhākāṇḍa of Rāmāyaṇa, the poem describes the message sent via a bumblebee by Rāma, spending the four months of the rainy season on the Pravarṣaṇa mountain in Kiṣkindhā, to Sītā, held captive by Rāvaṇa in Laṅkā.

A copy of the poem, with the Guñjana Hindi commentary by the poet himself, was published by the Jagadguru Rambhadracharya Handicapped University, Chitrakuta, Uttar Pradesh. The book was released on 30 August 2004.

== Narrative ==
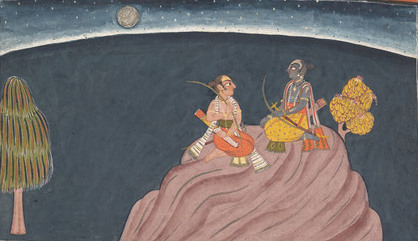
Rāma and Lakṣmaṇa on mount Pravarṣaṇa, the setup of Bhṛṅgadūtam

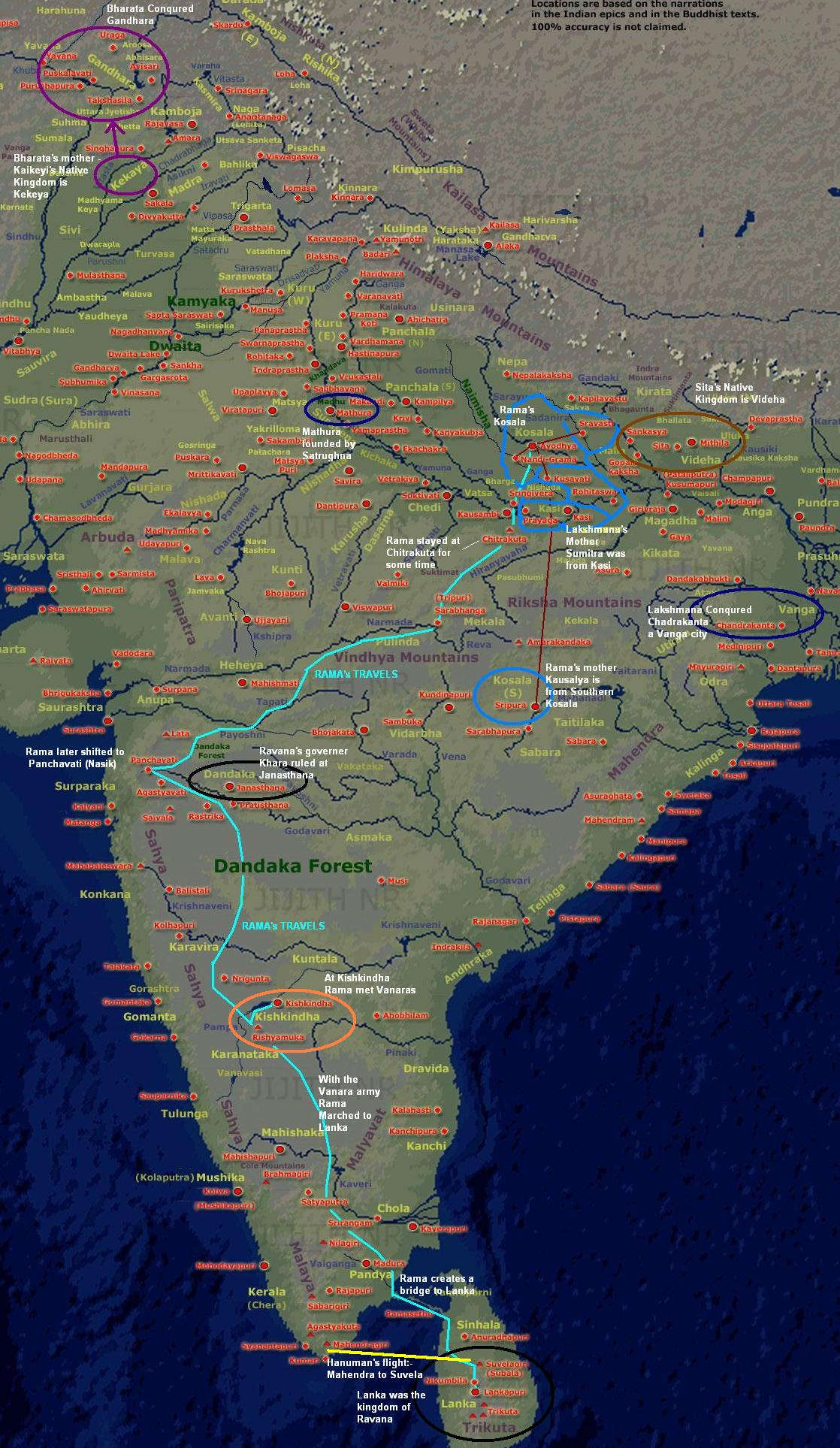
The path of the bumblebee in Bhṛṅgadūtam goes through all the places associated with the Rāmāyaṇa.

Like Meghadūtam of Kālidāsa, Bhṛṅgadūtam is divided in two parts. The first part is titled Pūrvabhṛṅgaḥ (literally, the earlier journey of the bumblebee) and consists of 251 verses. The second path is titled Uttarabhṛṅgaḥ (meaning the later journey of the bumblebee) and is composed of 250 verses. The actual message from Rāma is contained in 174 verses (2.71–2.245) of the Uttarabhṛṅgaḥ.

=== Part I: Pūrvabhṛṅgaḥ ===
One day while residing on the Pravarṣaṇa mountain with Lakṣmaṇa, Rāma comes to a lake to perform the morning Sandhyā. After the ritual, Rāma chooses a bumblebee (Bhṛṅga), a manifestation of his mind, as his messenger (Dūta) to Sītā. Rāma asks the bumblebee to have a pilgrimage of the pure land of Bhārata, before embarking on his journey to Laṅkā, saying the pilgrimage of this holy land absolves one of all sins. He asks the bumblebee to first visit Mithilā, to take some dust for Sītā from her birthplace. After seeing all the vividly described people and places of Mithilā related to the events in the Bālakāṇḍa of Rāmāyaṇa, the bumblebee is instructed to see all the rivers, hermitages and forests en route to Ayodhyā, which are described in detail by the poet. In 75 verses, various places and people of Ayodhyā are described, and the bumblebee is asked to bow to each one of them. Then after seeing Bharata and Śatrughna performing penance with their wives in Nandigrāma, the bumblebee is asked to fly over the route of Rāma's journey to Citrakūṭa as described in the Ayodhyākāṇḍa – the Śṛṅgaverapura kingdom of Guha; the confluence of the rivers Gaṅgā, Yamunā and Sarasvatī at Prayāgarāja; and finally Citrakūṭa are described in detail. The Pūrvabhṛṅgaḥ ends with the bumblebee asked to depart southwards from Citrakūṭa.

=== Part II: Uttarabhṛṅgaḥ ===
In the initial part of the Uttarabhṛṅgaḥ, the places of the events starting from Araṇyakāṇḍa are described. The poet presents the narrative of Rāmāyaṇa along with the directions Rāma gives to the bumblebee for his. The hermitages of various sages, whom Sītā, Rāma and Lakṣmaṇa met, are first described, leading to the banks of the river Godāvarī. The bumblebee is then instructed to see the locations of Jaṭayū's liberation and the Āśrama of Śramaṇā (the Śabarī woman). The locations of Kiṣkindhākāṇḍa come next – the description of the Ṛṣyamūka mountain, (where Hanumān and Rāma met) and other places in Kiṣkindhā. Then the bumblebee is asked to fly further south over the kingdoms of Karṇāṭaka, Āndhra, Madra and Kerala to Laṅkā. The bumblebee is asked to recognise Sītā in Laṅkā by her emaciated and weakened, yet lustrous, appearance.

The message for Sītā, to be delivered by the bumblebee, starts at verse 71 of the Uttarabhṛṅgaḥ. The message first describes the pathos of separation. This is followed by an assurance about Rāma heroism, which will convince Sītā to hold on to her life till Hanumān arrives to Laṅkā with another message and a ring from Rāma. The message ends at verse 244 of the Uttarabhṛṅgaḥ, and the poem ends in the next six verses.

== Poetic features ==
=== Play on Sanskrit grammar ===
The work has several verses which deal with Sanskrit etymology, wherein the composer poetically explains derivations of names of characters and places of the Ramāyaṇa. Some examples are –

Two origins of the word Ūrmilā and how they fit the character of Ūrmilā (1.120)

Devanagari
नो निर्वाति क्षणमपि सखेऽद्यापि नीराजनास्याः
सत्याब्राह्मीस्थितिरिव सतो लक्ष्मणप्राणिकायाः ।
ऊर्मीर्लान्ती दयितजलधौ राम भक्तेर्लुनन्ती
कूर्मीः क्रूराः भवभयभृतामूर्मिलेवोर्मिलैव ॥

IAST
no nirvāti kṣaṇamapi sakhe'adyāpi nīrājanāsyāḥ
satyābrāhmīsthitiriva sato lakṣmaṇaprāṇikāyāḥ ।
ūrmīrlāntī dayitajaladhau rāma bhakterlunantī
kūrmīḥ krūrāḥ bhavabhayabhṛtāmūrmilevormilaiva ॥

The derivation (Prakriyā) of the word Lakṣmaṇa, and how it is apt for the character of Lakṣmaṇa (1.121) –

Devanagari
आरार्तिक्यं तव विगणयन्हर्तुमार्तिं जनानां
सेवालक्ष्ये धृतशुचिमना लक्ष्मणोऽन्वर्थनामा ।
सम्प्रत्येश्यन्मयि च मनसो लोपयित्वानुबन्धं
संज्ञासिद्धिं स्वभजनबहुव्रीहिकारं चकार ॥

IAST
ārārtikyaṃ tava vigaṇayanhartumārtiṃ janānāṃ
sevālakṣye dhṛtaśucimanā lakṣmaṇo'anvarthanāmā ।
sampratyeśyanmayi ca manaso lopayitvānubandhaṃ
saṃjñāsiddhiṃ svabhajanabahuvrīhikāraṃ cakāra ॥

Suggestion of alternate names apt for Nandigrāma (1.153) –

Devanagari
क्रन्दिग्रामः किमु न करुणैः क्रन्दितै रामबन्धो-
र्वन्दिग्रामः किमु न चरितैर्माण्डवीजानिगीतैः ।
स्यन्दिग्रामो भरतनयनस्यन्दिभिः किं न नीरै-
र्नन्दिग्रामः प्रति विदधते चित्रमुत्प्रेक्षितानि ॥

IAST
krandigrāmaḥ kimu na karuṇaiḥ kranditai rāmabandho-
rvandigrāmaḥ kimu na caritairmāṇḍavījānigītaiḥ ।
syandigrāmo bharatanayanasyandibhiḥ kiṃ na nīrai-
rnandigrāmaḥ prati vidadhate citramutprekṣitāni ॥

The meaning and Prakriyā of the word Gaṅgā, and how the name is apt for the name of the river (1.196) –

Devanagari
त्रातुं जीवान्प्रकृतिकुटिलान्घोरसंसारसिन्धो-
र्या कौटिल्यं श्रयति गमनेऽप्यङ्गगङ्गन्ति गां च ।
डित्सामर्थ्याद्भमभिदधती प्रत्ययं नानुबन्धं
गङ्गेत्याख्यानुगुणचरिता जुष्टपार्षोदरादिः ॥

IAST
trātuṃ jīvānprakṛtikuṭilānghorasaṃsārasindho-
ryā kauṭilyaṃ śrayati gamaneऽpyaṅgagaṅganti gāṃ ca ।
ḍitsāmarthyādbhamabhidadhatī pratyayaṃ nānubandhaṃ
gaṅgetyākhyānuguṇacaritā juṣṭapārṣodarādiḥ ॥

Four origins of the word Grāma, and how they suit the village of Guha (1.202) –

Devanagari
ग्रामो रामो गत इत अतो ग्रामनामा सुधामा
ग्रामो रामप्रतिमवपुषा श्यामशस्येन ग्रामः ।
ग्रामो रामामितगुणगणो गीयतेऽस्मिंस्ततोऽयं
ग्रामो रामो रम इह मतो विग्रहैर्वेदसञ्ज्ञैः ॥

IAST
grāmo rāmo gata ita ato grāmanāmā sudhāmā
grāmo rāmapratimavapuṣā śyāmaśasyena grāmaḥ ।
grāmo rāmāmitaguṇagaṇo gīyateऽsmiṃstatoऽyaṃ
grāmo rāmo rama iha mato vigrahairvedasañjñaiḥ ॥

Three origins for the word Kāmada, and how they fit the Citrakūṭa mountain (1.247) –

Devanagari
कं ब्रह्माणं मधुमथनमं मं महेशं नियच्छ-
न्यच्छन्नृभ्यो मदमलपदाम्भोजसेवैकसेवाम् ।
द्यन्वै कामं शुभगुणहरं शात्रवं सज्जनानां
भूतार्थे नोल्लसति ललितः कामदः कामदेन ॥

IAST
kaṃ brahmāṇaṃ madhumathanamaṃ maṃ maheśaṃ niyaccha-
nyacchannṛbhyo madamalapadāmbhojasevaikasevām ।
dyanvai kāmaṃ śubhaguṇaharaṃ śātravaṃ sajjanānāṃ
bhūtārthe nollasati lalitaḥ kāmadaḥ kāmadena ॥

How the Samāsa Sītārāma is both Samānādhikaraṇa and Vyadhikaraṇa (2.234) –

Devanagari
दम्पत्योर्नौ विलसतितमां रूपतश्चात्रभेदो
भावो भामे भुवनभवनौ विद्युदब्दोपमानौ ।
सीतारामाविति समुदितौ द्वन्द्वरीत्या नृलोके
सीतारामो व्यधिकरणतस्तत्पुमान्वा समानः ॥

IAST
dampatyornau vilasatitamāṃ rūpataścātrabhedo
bhāvo bhāme bhuvanabhavanau vidyudabdopamānau ।
sītārāmāviti samuditau dvandvarītyā nṛloke
sītārāmo vyadhikaraṇatastatpumānvā samānaḥ ॥

== Comparison with other Sanskrit Dūtakāvyas ==
Some features of the epic compared with previous Dūtakāvyas
Poem	Composer	Metre	Parts	Verses (poem)	Verses (message)	Messenger	Sender	Recipient	Messenger's journey
Meghadūtam	Kālidāsa	Mandākrāntā	2	114	12	A cloud	An unnamed Yakṣa	An unnamed Yakṣī	Rāmādri to Kailāsa (Central and Northern India)
Haṃsasandeśaḥ	Vedāntadeśikācārya	Mandākrāntā	2	110	16	A swan	Rāma	Sītā	Pampā lake to Laṅkā (Southern India)
Haṃsadūtam	Śrīla Rūpagosvāmī	Śikhariṇī	1	142	75	A swan	Lalitā, a companion of Rādhā	Kṛṣṇa	Vraja to Mathurā (Northern India)
Bhṛṅgadūtam	Rāmabhadrācārya	Mandākrāntā	2	501	174	A bumblebee	Rāma	Sītā	Pravarṣaṇa to Laṅkā, via Mithilā, Ayodhyā, Citrakūṭa and Daṇḍakāraṇya (Northern, Central and Southern India)
