= Payovrata =

Hindu observance

The payovrata (Sanskrit: पयोव्रत, romanized: Payovrata) is a vrata (penance) featured in Hinduism. In the Bhagavata Purana, this penance was observed by the goddess Aditi to propitiate Vishnu.

== Etymology ==
Payovrata literally means, 'milk vow' in Sanskrit.

== Practice ==
The payovrata is usually observed by adherents for twelve days, during which time they subsist on a diet of milk alone.

== Mythology ==
According to Hindu mythology, Aditi grew concerned about the plight of her sons, the devas, during the reign of the asura monarch Mahabali. Her husband, the sage Kashyapa, advised her to observe the payovrata to propitiate Vishnu. Having observed the penance for twelve days, Vishnu was born as her son, Vamana, subsequently vanquishing Mahabali.
