= Timeline of Rambhadracharya =

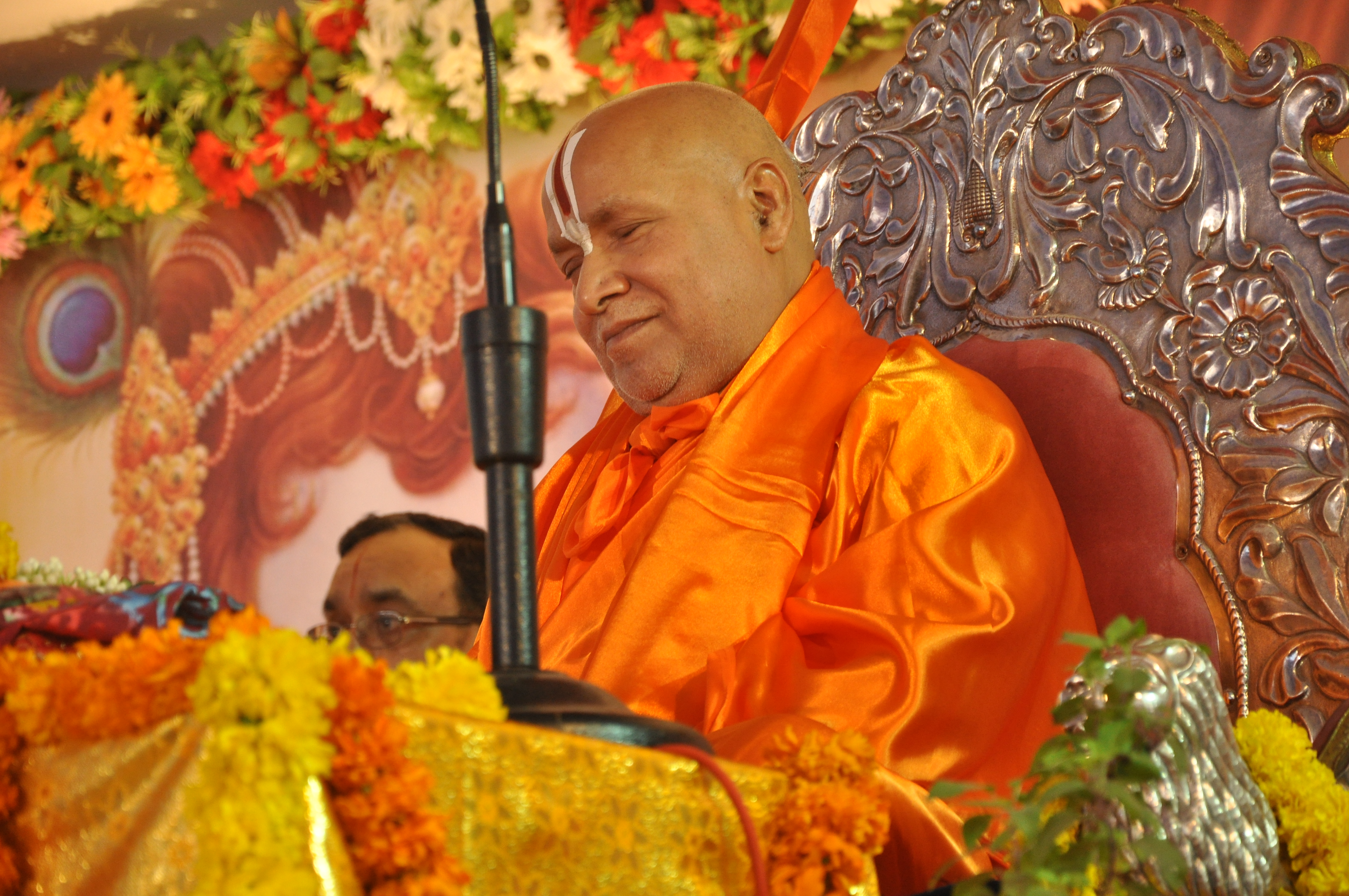
Rambhadracharya delivering a sermon in Baroda, Gujarat

This timeline lists important events relevant to the life of the Vaishnava (Hindu) spiritual leader, poet, commentator, educationist, religious and social figure Rambhadracharya (1950–present).

Jagadguru Ramanandacharya was born on 14 January 1950 as Giridhar Mishra. He is one of four incumbent Jagadguru Ramanandacharya, (Note: Leaders of the Ramananda monastic order.) and has held this title since 1988.

He is the establisher and head of Tulsi Peeth, a religious and social service institution named after saint Tulsidas, located in Chitrakoot. He is the founder and lifelong chancellor of the Jagadguru Rambhadracharya Handicapped University in Chitrakoot, which offers graduate and postgraduate courses exclusively to four types of disabled students. Rambhadracharya has been blind since the age of two months. He has never used Braille or any other aid to learn or compose.

Rambhadracharya can speak 22 languages (list unknown), and is a spontaneous poet (self proclaimed), (Note: Ashukavi.) and writer in Sanskrit, Hindi, Awadhi, Maithili, and several other languages. He has composed more than 90 works, including four epic poems, (Note: Two each in Sanskrit and Hindi.) a Hindi commentary on Tulsidas' Ramcharitmanas, a Sanskrit commentary in verse on the Ashtadhyayi, and Sanskrit commentaries on the Prasthanatrayi scriptures. He is regarded, by a few people, as one of the greatest authorities on Tulsidas in India, and is the editor of a critical edition of the Ramcharitmanas. He is Katha artist for the Ramayana and the Bhagavata. His Katha programmes are held regularly in different cities in India and other countries, and are telecast on television channels like Sanskar TV and Sanatan TV.

== Timeline ==
1950

- January 14:Born as Giridhar Mishra in Shandikhurd village of Jaunpur district to mother Shachidevi and father Pandit Rajdev Mishra.
- March 24:Eyes got infected by trachoma.

1953

- Composed his first piece of poetry—in Awadhi (a dialect of Hindi).
- June:Had a near-death experience when fell in a small dry well.

1955

- Memorised the entire Bhagavad Gita.
- Janmashtami:Recited the entire Bhagavad Gita.

1957

- Memorised the entire Ramcharitmanas.
- Rama Navami:Recited the entire Ramcharitmanas while fasting.

1961

- Had his Upanayana performed and given the Gayatri Mantra.
- Was stopped from joining his family in a wedding procession due to his disability.

1967

- July 7 - Joined the Adarsh Gaurishankar Sanskrit College.

1971

- Enrolled at the Sampurnanand Sanskrit University.

1974

- Topped the final examination for the Shastri (Bachelor of Arts) degree in Sanskrit grammar
- Won five gold medals at the Akhila Bharatiya Sanskrit Adhiveshan.

1976

- Topped the final examination for the Acharya (Master of Arts) degree in Sanskrit grammar.
- Narrated a Katha on Ramcharitmanas to Swami Karpatri.
- Won gold medal for standing first in all-India Sanskrit debate competition and a Chancellor's Gold Medal from by the Sampurnanand Sanskrit University.
- April 30 - Was declared Acharya of all subjects taught at the Sampurnanand Sanskrit University.

1979

- Observed his first Payovrata.

1980

- Wrote a Hindi minor poem Kākā Vidura, a Sanskrit minor poem Mukundasmaraṇam and a Hindi discourse Bharata Mahimā.

1981

- Wrote a Sanskrit dissertation (PhD thesis) Adhyātmarāmāyaṇe Apāṇinīyaprayogānāṃ Vimarśaḥ.
- October 14 - Completed his Vidyavaridhi degree in Sanskrit grammar.

1982

- Wrote a Hindi minor poem Mā̐ Śabarī and a Hindi deliberation Mānasa Me̐ Tāpasa Prasaṅga.

1983

- Wrote a Hindi commentary on Hanuman Chalisa Mahavīrī.
- November 19 - Took Virakta Diksha in the Ramananda Sampradaya.

1985

- Wrote a Hindi discourse Sugrīva Kā Agha Aura Vibhīṣaṇa Kī Karatūti and a Hindi commentary on the Bhagavad Gita Śrīgītātātparya.

1987

- Established a religious and social service institution called Tulsi Peeth.
- Wrote a Sanskrit hymn of praise Śrījānakīkṛpākaṭākṣastotram.

1988

- Wrote a Hindi deliberation Sanātanadharma Kī Vigrahasvarūpa Gomātā and a Hindi investigative research Śrītulasīsāhitya me̐ Kṛṣṇa Kathā.
- June 24 - Chosen as the Jagadguru Ramanandacharya seated at the Tulsi Peeth.

1989

- Wrote a Hindi discourse Mānasa me̐ Sumitrā.

1990

- Wrote a Hindi critique Sīta Nirvāsana Nahī̐.

1991

- Wrote a Sanskrit commentary on the Narada Bhakti Sutra Śrīnāradabhaktisūtreṣu Śrīrāghavakṛpābhāṣyam.

1992

- Wrote a Sanskrit hymn of praise Śrīrāmavallabhāstotram and a Hindi discourse Prabhu Kari Kṛpā Pā̐varī Dīnhī.

1993

- Wrote a Hindi lyrical poem Bhaktigītasudhā and a Hindi discourse Parama Baḍabhāgī Jaṭāyu.

1994

- Wrote a Hindi epic poem Arundhatī.
- Wrote a Sanskrit hymn of praise Śrīgaṅgāmahimnastotram.

1995

- Wrote a Sanskrit hymn of praise Śrīcitrakūṭavihāryaṣṭakam.
- August 1 - Ritually anointed as the Jagadguru Ramanandacharya.

1996

- Wrote a Sanskrit minor poem Ājādacandraśekharacaritam.
- Wrote a Single-act Sanskrit play-poem Śrīrāghavābhyudayam.
- August 23 - Established the Tulsi School for the Blind.

1997

- Wrote a Sanskrit commentary Aṣṭādhyāyyāḥ Pratisūtraṃ Śābdabodhasamīkṣaṇam.
- Wrote a Sanskrit poem Śrīrāmabhaktisarvasvam.
- May 9 - Was awarded the post-doctorate Vachaspati (DLitt) degree by Sampurnanand Sanskrit University.

1998

- Got the title of Dharmachakravarti by the World Religious Parliament.

1999

- Won the Kaviraj Vidya Narayan Shastri Archana-Samman Award from the Kaviraj Vidya Narayan Shastri Archana-Samman Committee, Bhagalpur and the Mahakavi title by the Akhil Bharatiya Hindi Bhasha Sammelan, Bihar.

2000

- Won the Vishishta Puraskar from the Uttar Pradesh Sanskrit Samsthana, Lucknow and the Mahamahopadhyay title by the Lal Bahadur Shastri Sanskrit Vidyapeeth, New Delhi.
- Wrote a Sanskrit minor poem Sarayūlaharī.

2001

- Wrote a Sanskrit minor poem Laghuraghuvaram.
- September 27 - Founded the Jagadguru Rambhadracharya Handicapped University.

2002

- Won the Kavikularatna title from Sampurnanand Sanskrit University, Varanasi.
- Wrote a Sanskrit epic poem Śrībhārgavarāghavīyam, a Sanskrit minor poem Śrīrāghavabhāvadarśanam, a Sanskrit commentary on the Rāmastavarājastotra Śrīrāmastavarājastotre Śrīrāghavakṛpābhāṣyam and a Hindi discourse Śrī Sītārāma Vivāha Darśana.

2003

- Won the Rajshekhar Samman from the Madhya Pradesh Sanskrit Academy, Bhopal, the Bhaurao Deoras Award by the Bhaurao Deoras Seva Nyas, Lucknow, the Diwaliben Award by the Dewaliben Mehta Charitable Trust, Mumbai and the Ativishishta Puraskar by the Uttar Pradesh Sanskrit Samsthana, Lucknow.
- Wrote a Sanskrit letter poem Kubjāpatram.
- July - Deposed as an expert witness in the Ram Janmabhoomi Babri Masjid dispute case in the Allahabad High Court.

2004

- Won the Awadh Ratna title from the Awadh Vikas Parishad, Allahabad and the Badarayana Puraskar.
- Wrote a Sanskrit minor poem Bhṛṅgadūtam and a Hindi discourse Tuma Pāvaka Ma̐ha Karahu Nivāsā.

2005

- Wrote a Hindi commentary on the Ramcharitmanas Bhāvārthabodhinī.
- Won the Sahitya Akademi Award for Sanskrit for Śrībhārgavarāghavīyam.

2006

- Won the Sanskrit Mahamahopadhyay title from the Hindi Sahitya Sammelan, Prayag, the Shreevani Alankaran award from the Jaydayal Dalmiya Shri Vani Trust and the Banabhatta Award from the Madhya Pradesh Sanskrit Board, Bhopal.
- Wrote a Hindi discourse Ahalyoddhāra.

2007

- Won the Goswami Tulsidas Samarchan Samman from the Tulsi Research Institute, Municipal Corporation, Allahabad and the Vachaspati Award by the K. K. Birla Foundation, New Delhi.
- Wrote a Hindi deliberation on Rāsapañcādhyāyī Śrīrāsapañcādhyāyīvimarśaḥ.
- November 27 - Received a letter telling him and his disciples either to accept Islam or to be prepared to die.
- November 30 - Released the first Braille version of the Bhagavad Gita.

2008

- Wrote a Hindi discourse Ahalyoddhāra.
- Wrote a Hindi Rītikāvya Hara Te Bhe Hanumāna.

2009

- Wrote a Sanskrit suprabhatam Śrīsītārāmasuprabhātam.
- November - Accused of tampering with the Ramcharitmanas.

2010

- Wrote a Hindi epic poem Aṣṭāvakra.

2011

- Won the Tulsi Award 2011 from Morari Bapu and the Dev Bhumi Award from the Government of Himachal Pradesh, Shimla.
- Wrote a Sanskrit lyrical epic poem Gītarāmāyaṇam, a Awadhi lyrical poem Avadha Kai Ajoriyā and a Sanskrit minor poem Śrīsītāsudhānidhiḥ.

2014

- November - Nominated by the Indian Prime Minister Narendra Modi for the Clean India Campaign.

2015

- January 25 - Awarded Padma Vibhushan, India's second highest civilian honour.

== See also ==
- Works of Rambhadracharya

== Works cited ==
- Agarwal, Sudhir J. (30 September 2010). "Consolidated Judgment in OOS No. 1 of 1989, OOS No. 3 of 1989, OOS No. 4 of 1989 & OOS No. 5 of 1989". Lucknow, Uttar Pradesh, India: Allahabad High Court (Lucknow Bench). Archived from the original on 27 August 2014.
- Aneja, Mukta (2005). "Shri Ram Bhadracharyaji – A Religious Head With A Vision". In Kaul, J. K.; Abraham, George (eds.). Abilities Redefined – Forty Life Stories Of Courage And Accomplishment (PDF). Delhi, India: All India Confederation of the Blind. pp. 66–68. Archived from the original (PDF) on 3 September 2011.
- Bhuyan, Devajit (2002). Multiple Career Choices. New Delhi, India: Pustak Mahal. ISBN 9788122307795. Archived from the original on 26 January 2024.
- Chandra, R. (September 2008). "सम्मान और पुरस्कार" [Honours and Awards]. Kranti Bharat Samachar (in Hindi). 8 (11). Lucknow, Uttar Pradesh, India: Rajesh Chandra Pandey. RNI No. 2000, UPHIN 2638.
- Dinkar, Dr. Vagish (2008). श्रीभार्गवराघवीयम् मीमांसा [Investigation into Śrībhārgavarāghavīyam] (in Hindi). Delhi, India: Deshbharti Prakashan. ISBN 9788190827669.
- Dwivedi, Hazari Prasad (2007) [August 1981]. Dwivedi, Mukund (ed.). हज़ारी प्रसाद द्विवेदी ग्रन्थावली ३ [The Complete Works of Hazari Prasad Dwivedi Volume 3] (in Hindi) (3rd corrected and extended ed.). New Delhi: Rajkamal. ISBN 978-81-267-1358-5.
- Dwivedi, Gyanendra Kumar (2008). Analysis and Design of Algorithm. New Delhi, India: Laxmi Publications. ISBN 978-81-318-0116-1.
- Gupta, Amita; Kumar, Ashish (6 July 2006). Handbook of Universities. New Delhi, India: Atlantic Publishers and Distributors. ISBN 9788126906086. Archived from the original on 26 January 2024.
- Lochtefeld, James G. (2001). The Illustrated Encyclopedia of Hinduism: N-Z. New York, New York, USA: Rosen Publishing Group. ISBN 9780823931804.
- Macfie, J. M. (2004). "Preface". The Ramayan of Tulsidas or the Bible of Northern India. Whitefish, Montana, USA: Kessinger. ISBN 9781417914982. Archived from the original on 26 January 2024.
- Mishra, Gita Devi (August 2011). Sushil, Surendra Sharma (ed.). "पूज्यपाद जगद्गुरु जी को तुलसी एवार्ड २०११" [Tulsi Award 2011 to Honorable Jagadguru]. Shri Tulsi Peeth Saurabh (in Hindi). 15 (3). Ghaziabad, Uttar Pradesh, India: Shri Tulsi Peeth Seva Nyas.
- Nagar, Shanti Lal (2002). Sharma, Acharya Divakar; Goyal, Siva Kumar; Sushil, Surendra Sharma (eds.). The Holy Journey of a Divine Saint: Being the English Rendering of Swarnayatra Abhinandan Granth (First, Hardback ed.). New Delhi, India: B. R. Publishing Corporation. ISBN 81-7646-288-8.
- Pandey, Ram Ganesh (2008) [First edition 2003]. तुलसी जन्म भूमि: शोध समीक्षा [The Birthplace of Tulasidasa: Investigative Research] (in Hindi) (Corrected and extended ed.). Chitrakoot, Uttar Pradesh, India: Bharati Bhavan Publication.
- Poddar, Hanuman Prasad (1996). Dohāvalī (in Hindi). Gorakhpur, Uttar Pradesh, India: Gita Press.
- Prasad, Ram Chandra (1999) [First published 1991]. Sri Ramacaritamanasa The Holy Lake Of The Acts Of Rama (Illustrated, reprint ed.). Delhi, India: Motilal Banarsidass. ISBN 81-208-0762-6.
- Rambhadracharya, Jagadguru, ed. (30 March 2006). श्रीरामचरितमानस – मूल गुटका (तुलसीपीठ संस्करण) [Śrīrāmacaritamānasa – Original Text (Tulasīpīṭha edition)] (in Hindi) (4th ed.). Chitrakoot, Uttar Pradesh, India: Jagadguru Rambhadracharya Handicapped University.
- Sharma, Dharam Veer (30 September 2010a). "Judgment in OOS No. 4 of 1989". Lucknow, Uttar Pradesh, India: Allahabad High Court (Lucknow Bench). Archived from the original on 27 August 2014.
- Sharma, Dharam Veer (30 September 2010b). "Annexure V". Lucknow, Uttar Pradesh, India: Allahabad High Court (Lucknow Bench). Archived from the original on 27 August 2014.
- Sharma, Acharya Divakar; Sushil, Surendra Sharma; Shrivastav, Vandana, eds. (14 January 2011). षष्टिपूर्ति (अभिनन्दनग्रन्थ) [Completion of 60 years (Felicitation Book)] (in Hindi). Ghaziabad, Uttar Pradesh, India: Tulsi Mandal.
- Sushil, Surendra Sharma; Mishra, Abhiraj Rajendra (February 2011). Sushil, Surendra Sharma (ed.). "गीतरामायणप्रशस्तिः" [Praise of Gītarāmāyaṇam]. Shri Tulsi Peeth Saurabh (in Hindi). 14 (9). Ghaziabad, Uttar Pradesh, India: Shri Tulsi Peeth Seva Nyas.
