= Works of Rambhadracharya =

List of works by Hindu religious leader Rambhadracharya

Rambhadracharya bibliography
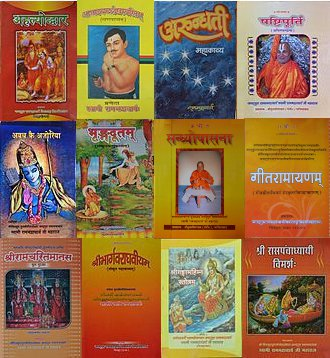
- Book covers of several works of Rambhadracharya
- Poems↙: 28
- Plays↙: 2
- Music↙: 5
- Commentaries↙: 19
- Critiques↙: 6
- Discourses↙: 9

Jagadguru Rambhadracharya (or Swami Rambhadracharya) is a Hindu religious leader, Sanskrit scholar and Katha artist based in Chitrakoot, India. His works consist of poems, commentaries, plays and musical compositions of his works, etc. He has authored more than 250 books and 50 papers, including four epic poems (two each in Sanskrit and Hindi), a Hindi commentary on Tulsidas' Ramcharitmanas, and Sanskrit commentaries on the Ashtadhyayi and the Prasthanatrayi scriptures. Various audio and video recordings o his works have also been released. He writes in Sanskrit, Hindi, Awadhi, Maithili, and several other languages.

Śrībhārgavarāghavīyam is his most notable work, for which he won several awards including the Sahitya Akademi Award for Sanskrit. He has also been given many other literary honors and titles, such as Mahakavi (Great poet) and Kavikularatna (Jewel of the poet clan).

His major literary and musical compositions, grouped by genre, are listed below.

== Key ==
–	Undated ("Year" column)
^{‡}	Unpublished manuscript
^{#}	Work in progress

== Poetry ==
=== Mahākāvyas (Epic poems) ===
Year	Title	Language	Publisher	Summary	Notes
1994	Arundhatī (अरुन्धती)	Hindi	Shri Raghav Sahitya Prakashan Nidhi, Haridwar	Epic poem composed in 1,279 verses divided into 15 cantos on the life of the seer couple Vasishtha and Arundhati.	
2002	Śrībhārgavarāghavīyam (श्रीभार्गवराघवीयम्)	Sanskrit	Jagadguru Rambhadracharya Handicapped University	Epic poem consisting of 2,121 verses composed in 40 Sanskrit and Prakrit metres, divided into 21 cantos of 101 verses each, with a Hindi commentary by the poet. Recipient of Sahitya Akademi Award for Sanskrit, Ramkrishna Jaidayal Dalmia Shreevani Alankaran, Banabhatta Award and Vachaspati Award.	
2010	Aṣṭāvakra (अष्टावक्र)	Hindi	Jagadguru Rambhadracharya Handicapped University	Epic poem composed in 864 verses divided into 8 cantos of 108 verses each. This epic narrates the story of the seer Ashtavakra, who is presented as the flag bearer of the disabled.	
2011	Gītarāmāyaṇam (गीतरामायणम्)	Sanskrit	Jagadguru Rambhadracharya Handicapped University	Sanskrit lyrical epic poem, narrating the Ramayana in 1,008 Sanskrit songs divided into 28 cantos of 36 songs each, based on traditional folk music tunes.	

=== Khaṇḍakāvyas (minor poems) ===
Year	Title	Language	Publisher	Summary	Notes
1980	Kākā Vidura (काका विदुर)	Hindi	Shri Gita Gyan Mandir, Rajkot	Minor poem on the character Vidura from Mahabharata.	
1980	Mukundasmaraṇam (मुकुन्दस्मरणम्)	Sanskrit	Shri Gita Gyan Mandir, Rajkot	Minor poem in two parts eulogising Krishna.	
1982	Mā̐ Śabarī (मा̐ शबरी)	Hindi	Giridhar Koshalendra Chiantan Samiti, Darbhanga	Minor poem on the character Shabari from Ramayana.	
1996	Ājādacandraśekharacaritam (आजादचन्द्रशेखरचरितम्)	Sanskrit	Shri Tulsi Peeth Seva Nyas	Minor poem on the acts and life of the Indian freedom fighter Chandrashekhar Azad, with a Hindi commentary by Dr. Gita Devi Misra.	
2000	Sarayūlaharī (सरयूलहरी)	Sanskrit	Shri Tulsi Peeth Seva Nyas	Minor poem on the river Sarayu that flows through Ayodhya.	
2001	Laghuraghuvaram (लघुरघुवरम्)	Sanskrit	Shri Tulsi Peeth Seva Nyas	Minor poem on the infant form of Rama composed only in the short syllables of Sanskrit.	
2004	Bhṛṅgadūtam (भृङ्गदूतम्)	Sanskrit	Jagadguru Rambhadracharya Handicapped University	Consisting of 501 verses divided in two parts and composed entirely in the Mandākrāntā metre, this minor poem describes the message sent by Rama via a bumblebee, residing on the Pravarṣaṇa mountain in Kishkindha, to his wife Sita, who is held captive by Ravana in Lanka.	

=== Gītakāvyas (lyrical poems) ===
Year	Title	Language	Publisher	Summary	Notes
1991	Rāghavagītaguñjana (राघवगीतगुञ्जन)	Hindi	Shri Raghav Sahitya Prakashan Nidhi, Haridwar	Lyrical poem	
1993	Bhaktigītasudhā (भक्तिगीतसुधा)	Hindi	Shri Raghav Sahitya Prakashan Nidhi, Haridwar	Lyrical poem with 438 songs on Rama and Krishna.	

=== Śatakakāvyas (Poems of one hundred verses) ===
Year	Title	Language	Publisher	Summary	Notes
1997	Śrīrāmabhaktisarvasvam (श्रीरामभक्तिसर्वस्वम्)	Sanskrit	Shri Tulsi Peeth Seva Nyas	Poem of one hundred verses.	
–	Āryāśatakam (आर्याशतकम्) ^{‡}	Sanskrit	—	Poem of one hundred verses in the Arya metre.	
–	Caṇḍīśatakam (चण्डीशतकम्) ^{‡}	Sanskrit	—	Poem of one hundred verses in praise of the goddess Chandi.	
–	Rāghavendraśatakam (राघवेन्द्रशतकम्) ^{‡}	Sanskrit	—	Poem of one hundred verses in praise of Rama.	
–	Gaṇapatiśatakam (गणपतिशतकम्) ^{‡}	Sanskrit	—	Poem of one hundred verses in praise of Ganesha.	
–	Śrīrāghavacaraṇacihnaśatakam (श्रीराघवचरणचिह्नशतकम्) ^{‡}	Sanskrit	—	Poem of one hundred verses in praise of footprints of Rama.	

=== Stotrakāvyas (Eulogies) ===
Year	Title	Language	Publisher	Summary	Notes
1987	Śrījānakīkṛpākaṭākṣastotram (श्रीजानकीकृपाकटाक्षस्तोत्रम्)	Sanskrit	Shri Tulsi Peeth Seva Nyas	Poem eulogising the compassionate glance of Sita.	
1992	Śrīrāmavallabhāstotram (श्रीरामवल्लभास्तोत्रम्)	Sanskrit	Shri Raghav Sahitya Prakashan Nidhi, Haridwar	Poem eulogising Sita.	
1994	Śrīgaṅgāmahimnastotram (श्रीगङ्गामहिम्नस्तोत्रम्)	Sanskrit	Shri Raghava Sahitya Prakashan Nidhi, Haridwar	Poem eulogising the greatness of the river Ganges.	
1995	Śrīcitrakūṭavihāryaṣṭakam (श्रीचित्रकूटविहार्यष्टकम्)	Sanskrit	Shri Raghav Sahitya Prakashan Nidhi, Haridwar	Poem in eight verses eulogising Rama.	
2002	Śrīrāghavabhāvadarśanam (श्रीराघवभावदर्शनम्)	Sanskrit	Shri Tulsi Peeth Seva Nyas	Poem in eight Śikhariṇī metres, eulogising the birth of Rama by comparing infant Rama via eight Utprekṣā figures of speech respectively to the moon, a dark cloud, the ocean, an emerald, a Tamāla tree, Kamadeva, a blue lotus, and a bumblebee. With an Awadhi poetic translation and Hindi commentary by the poet.	

=== Other poems ===
Year	Title	Language	Publisher	Summary	Notes
2003	Kubjāpatram (कुब्जापत्रम्)	Sanskrit	Jagadguru Rambhadracharya Handicapped University	A Patrakāvya (letter poem); letter to Krishna from the hunchback female whose episode is described in the Bhagavata Purana.	
2008	Śrīsītārāmakelikaumudī (श्रीसीतारामकेलिकौमुदी)	Hindi	Jagadguru Rambhadracharya Handicapped University	A Rītikāvya (Procedural–era Hindi poem), consisting of 327 assorted verses, divided in three parts of 109 verses each, composed in six Prakrit metres. The verses describe different activities of the child forms of Sita and Rama.	
2009	Śrīsītārāmasuprabhātam (श्रीसीतारामसुप्रभातम्)	Sanskrit	Jagadguru Rambhadracharya Handicapped University	A suprabhatam (hymn sung at dawn) addressed to Sita and Rama, consisting of 40 verses composed in 8 Śārdūlavikrīḍita, 24 Vasantatilakā, 4 Sragdharā, and 4 Mālinī metres. With a Hindi translation by the poet.	

== Plays ==
Year	Title	Language	Publisher	Summary	Notes
1996	Śrīrāghavābhyudayam (श्रीराघवाभ्युदयम्)	Sanskrit	Shri Tulsi Peeth Seva Nyas	Single–act Nāṭakakāvya (Play poem) on the ascent of Rama.	
–	Utsāha (उत्साह)	Hindi	Shri Tulsi Peeth Seva Nyas	–	

== Prose ==
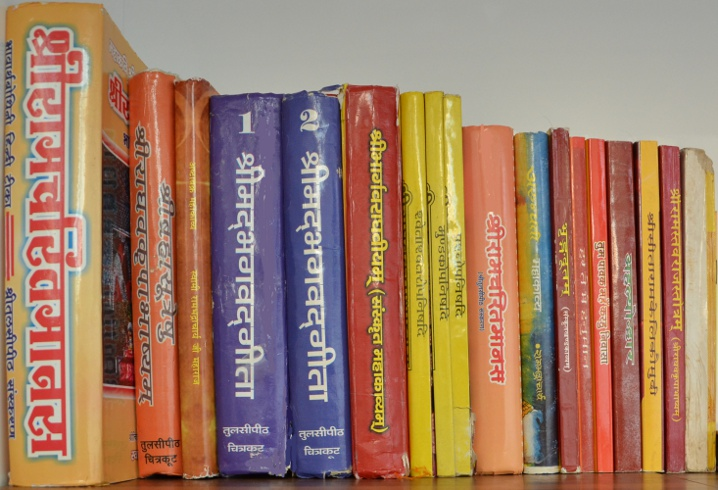
Some of the books written by Rambhadracharya

=== Sanskrit commentaries on the Prasthānatrayī ===
Rambhadracharya composed Sanskrit commentaries titled Śrīrāghavakṛpābhāṣyam on the Prasthanatrayi – Brahma Sutra, the Bhagavad Gita, and eleven Upanishads. These commentaries were released on 10 April 1998 by the then Prime Minister of India, Atal Behari Vajpayee. Rambhadracharya composed Śrīrāghavakṛpābhāṣyam on Narada Bhakti Sutra in 1991. He thus revived—after five hundred years—the tradition of Sanskrit commentaries on the Prasthanatrayi. He also gave the Ramananda Sampradaya its second commentary on Prasthanatrayi in Sanskrit, the first being the Ānandabhāṣyam, composed by Ramananda himself. Rambhadracharya's commentary in Sanskrit on the Prasthanatrayi was the first written in almost 600 years.

Year	Title	Commentary on	Publisher	Notes
1998	Śrībrahmasūtreṣu Śrīrāghavakṛpābhāṣyam (श्रीब्रह्मसूत्रेषु श्रीराघवकृपाभाष्यम्)	Brahma Sutra	Shri Tulsi Peeth Seva Nyas	
1998	Śrīmadbhagavadgītāsu Śrīrāghavakṛpābhāṣyam (श्रीमद्भगवद्गीतासु श्रीराघवकृपाभाष्यम्)	Bhagavad Gita	Shri Tulsi Peeth Seva Nyas	
1998	Kaṭhopaniṣadi Śrīrāghavakṛpābhāṣyam (कठोपनिषदि श्रीराघवकृपाभाष्यम्)	Katha Upanishad	Shri Tulsi Peeth Seva Nyas	
1998	Kenopaniṣadi Śrīrāghavakṛpābhāṣyam (केनोपनिषदि श्रीराघवकृपाभाष्यम्)	Kena Upanishad	Shri Tulsi Peeth Seva Nyas	
1998	Māṇḍūkyopaniṣadi Śrīrāghavakṛpābhāṣyam (माण्डूक्योपनिषदि श्रीराघवकृपाभाष्यम्)	Mandukya Upanishad	Shri Tulsi Peeth Seva Nyas	
1998	Iśāvāsyopaniṣadi Śrīrāghavakṛpābhāṣyam (ईशावास्योपनिषदि श्रीराघवकृपाभाष्यम्)	Ishavasya Upanishad	Shri Tulsi Peeth Seva Nyas	
1998	Praśnopaniṣadi Śrīrāghavakṛpābhāṣyam (प्रश्नोपनिषदि श्रीराघवकृपाभाष्यम्)	Prashna Upanishad	Shri Tulsi Peeth Seva Nyas	
1998	Taittirīyopaniṣadi Śrīrāghavakṛpābhāṣyam (तैत्तिरीयोपनिषदि श्रीराघवकृपाभाष्यम्)	Taittiriya Upanishad	Shri Tulsi Peeth Seva Nyas	
1998	Aitareyopaniṣadi Śrīrāghavakṛpābhāṣyam (ऐतरेयोपनिषदि श्रीराघवकृपाभाष्यम्)	Aitareya Upanishad	Shri Tulsi Peeth Seva Nyas	
1998	Śvetāsvataropaniṣadi Śrīrāghavakṛpābhāṣyam (श्वेताश्वतरोपनिषदि श्रीराघवकृपाभाष्यम्)	Shvetashvatara Upanishad	Shri Tulsi Peeth Seva Nyas	
1998	Chāndogyopaniṣadi Śrīrāghavakṛpābhāṣyam (छान्दोग्योपनिषदि श्रीराघवकृपाभाष्यम्)	Chandogya Upanishad	Shri Tulsi Peeth Seva Nyas	
1998	Bṛhadāraṇyakopaniṣadi Śrīrāghavakṛpābhāṣyam (बृहदारण्यकोपनिषदि श्रीराघवकृपाभाष्यम्)	Brihadaranyaka Upanishad	Shri Tulsi Peeth Seva Nyas	
1998	Muṇḍakopaniṣadi Śrīrāghavakṛpābhāṣyam (मुण्डकोपनिषदि श्रीराघवकृपाभाष्यम्)	Mundaka Upanishad	Shri Tulsi Peeth Seva Nyas	

=== Other Sanskrit commentaries ===
Year	Title	Commentary on	Publisher	Notes
1991	Śrīnāradabhaktisūtreṣu Śrīrāghavakṛpābhāṣyam (श्रीनारदभक्तिसूत्रेषु श्रीराघवकृपाभाष्यम्)	Narada Bhakti Sutra	Shri Tulsi Peeth Seva Nyas	
1997	Aṣṭādhyāyyāḥ Pratisūtraṃ Śābdabodhasamīkṣaṇam (अष्टाध्याय्याः प्रतिसूत्रं शाब्दबोधसमीक्षणम्)	Sutras of the Ashtadhyayi. (D Litt dissertation)	Under publication by the Rashtriya Sanskrit Sansthan	
2001	Śrīrāmastavarājastotre Śrīrāghavakṛpābhāṣyam (श्रीरामस्तवराजस्तोत्रे श्रीराघवकृपाभाष्यम्)	Rāmastavarājastotra	Shri Tulsi Peeth Seva Nyas	

=== Hindi commentaries ===
Year	Title	Commentary on	Publisher	Notes
1983	Mahavīrī (महावीरी)	Critical edition of Hanuman Chalisa, with a commentary named Mahavīrī	Shri Krishna Janma Seva Sansthan, Mathura	
1985	Śrīgītātātparya (श्रीगीतातात्पर्य)	Bhagavad Gita	Shri Raghav Sahitya Prakashan Nidhi, Haridwar	
2005	Bhāvārthabodhinī (भावार्थबोधिनी)	Ramcharitmanas	Jagadguru Rambhadracharya Handicapped University	
–	Śrīrāghavakṛpābhāṣya (श्रीराघवकृपभाष्य) ^{#}	Commentary on the Ramcharitmanas in nine volumes.	—	

=== Critiques ===
Year	Title	Language	Publisher	Summary	Notes
1981	Adhyātmarāmāyaṇe Apāṇinīyaprayogānāṃ Vimarśaḥ (अध्यात्मरामायणे अपाणिनीयप्रयोगानां विमर्शः) ^{‡}	Sanskrit	—	Deliberation on the non–Paninian usages in the Adhyātma Rāmāyaṇa. PhD dissertation.	
1982	Mānasa Me̐ Tāpasa Prasaṅga (मानस में तापस प्रसंग)	Hindi	Shri Gita Gyan Mandir, Rajkot	Deliberation on the episode of the unnamed ascetic in Ayodhya Kand of Ramcharitmanas.	
1988	Sanātanadharma Kī Vigrahasvarūpa Gomātā (सनातनधर्म की विग्रहस्वरूप गोमाता)	Hindi	Shri Raghav Sahitya Prakashan Nidhi, Haridwar	Deliberation on the status of the cow in Hinduism.	
1988	Śrītulasīsāhitya me̐ Kṛṣṇa Kathā (श्रीतुलसीसाहित्य में कृष्णकथा)	Hindi	Shri Raghav Sahitya Prakashan Nidhi, Haridwar	Investigative research into the narrative of Krishna in the works of Tulsidas.	
1990	Sīta Nirvāsana Nahī̐ (सीता निर्वासन नहीं)	Hindi	Shri Raghav Sahitya Prakashan Nidhi, Haridwar	Critique which argues that the episode of banishment of Sita is a later interpolation of Valmiki in the Ramayana.	
2007	Śrīrāsapañcādhyāyīvimarśaḥ (श्रीरासपञ्चाध्यायीविमर्शः)	Hindi	Jagadguru Rambhadracharya Handicapped University	Deliberation on the Rāsapañcādhyāyī section, the five chapters dealing with the celestial dance of Krishna with the Gopis, of the Bhagavata Purana.	

=== Discourses ===
Year	Title	Language	Book consisting of	Publisher	Notes
1980	Bharata Mahimā (भरत महिमा)	Hindi	A nine–day discourse on the glory of Bharata in the Ramayana.	Shri Gita Gyan Mandir, Rajkot	
1985	Sugrīva Kā Agha Aura Vibhīṣaṇa Kī Karatūti (सुग्रीव का अघ और विभीषण की करतूति)	Hindi	A nine–day Hindi discourse on the two characters Sugriva and Vibhishana in the Ramayana.	Shri Krishna Janma Seva Sansthan, Mathura	
1989	Mānasa me̐ Sumitrā (मानस में सुमित्रा)	Hindi	A nine–day discourse on the character of Sumitra in the Ramcharitmanas.	Shri Raghav Sahitya Prakashan Nidhi, Haridwar	
1992	Prabhu Kari Kṛpā Pā̐varī Dīnhī (प्रभु करि कृपा पाँवरी दीन्ही)	Hindi	A nine–day discourse on the episode of Rama handing over his sandals to Bharata at Chitrakoot from the Ramayana.	Shri Tulsi Peeth Seva Nyas	
1993	Parama Baḍabhāgī Jaṭāyu (परम बड़भागी जटायु)	Hindi	A nine–day discourse on the character of Jatayu in the Ramayana.	Shri Raghav Sahitya Prakashan Nidhi, Haridwar	
2001	Śrī Sītārāma Vivāha Darśana (श्री सीताराम विवाह दर्शन)	Hindi	An eight-day discourse delivered in March 1999 on the purport of Sita and Rama's marriage episode as described in the Ramcharitmanas.	Shri Tulsi Peeth Seva Nyas	
2004	Tuma Pāvaka Ma̐ha Karahu Nivāsā (तुम पावक मँह करहु निवासा)	Hindi	A nine–day discourse delivered in September 2003 on the episode of Sīta's stay in fire as described in the Ramcharitmanas.	Jagadguru Rambhadracharya Handicapped University	
2006	Ahalyoddhāra (अहल्योद्धार)	Hindi	A nine–day discourse delivered in April 2000 on the episode of Ahalya's liberation by Rama.	Jagadguru Rambhadracharya Handicapped University	
2008	Hara Te Bhe Hanumāna (हर ते भे हनुमान)	Hindi	A four–day discourse delivered in April 2007 on Hanuman being Shiva's incarnation.	Jagadguru Rambhadracharya Handicapped University	

=== Critical edition of Ramcharitmanas ===
Rambhadracharya's most controversial work was the critical edition of the Ramcharitmanas, which was published as the Tulsi Peeth edition. He was accused of tampering with the epic, but the dispute died down after Rambhadracharya expressed his regret for any annoyance or pain caused by the publication. A writ petition was also filed against him but it was dismissed. This edition was published in 2005 by Shri Tulsi Peeth Seva Nyas.

== Audio and video ==
Year	Title	Language	Publisher	Summary	Notes
2001	Bhajana Sarayū (भजन सरयू)	Hindi	Yuki Cassettes, Delhi	Audio CD with eight Bhajans (devotional hymns) devoted to Rama. Composed, set to music, and sung by Rambhadracharya.	
2001	Bhajana Yamunā (भजन यमुना)	Hindi	Yuki Cassettes, Delhi	Audio CD with seven Bhajans devoted to Krishna. Composed, set to music, and sung by Rambhadracharya.	
2009	Śrī Hanumat Bhakti (श्री हनुमत् भक्ति)	Hindi	Kuber Music, New Delhi	Audio CD with six Bhajans devoted to Hanuman, and composed by Tulsidas. Set to music and sung by Rambhadracharya.	
2009	Śrīsītārāmasuprabhātam (श्रीसीतारामसुप्रभातम्)	Sanskrit	Yuki Cassettes, Delhi	Audio CD of Śrīsītārāmasuprabhātam, a Suprabhata poem. Composed, set to music, and sung in the Vairagi Raga by Rambhadracharya.	
2009	Sundara Kāṇḍa (सुन्दर काण्ड)	Hindi	Yuki Cassettes, Delhi	DVD with a musical rendition of and commentary on the Sundar Kand of Ramcharitmanas. Spoken, set to music, and sung by Rambhadracharya.	

== See also ==
- List of awards and honours received by Rambhadracharya
- Adi Shankara bibliography
- Works of Madhvacharya
