= List of awards and honours received by Rambhadracharya =

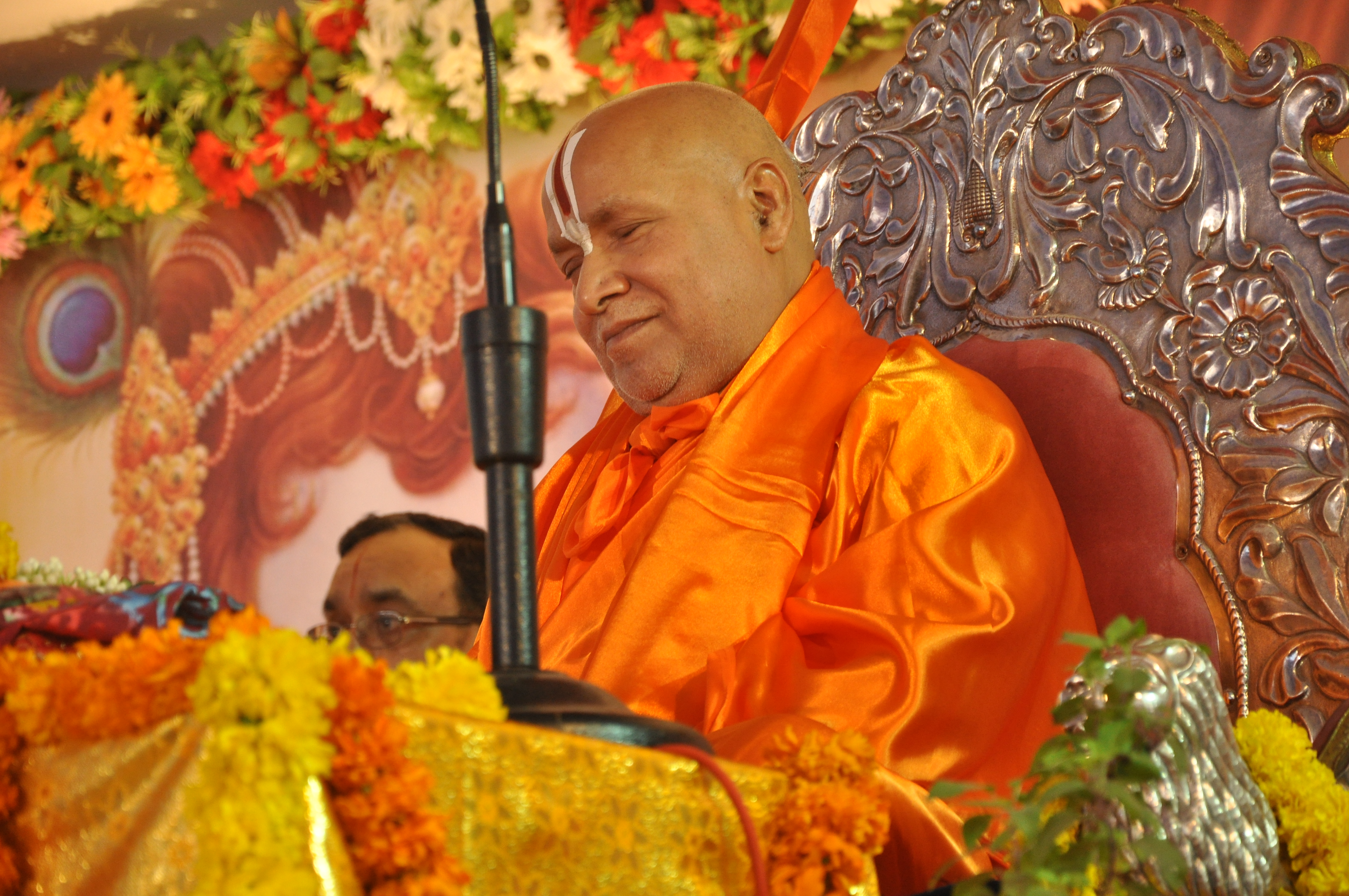
Jagadguru Rambhadracharya delivering a sermon in Baroda, Gujarat, India

This is a comprehensive list of awards and nominations won by Jagadguru Rambhadracharya. Rambhadracharya is a Hindu religious leader, Sanskrit scholar, writer and commentator and Katha artist based in Chitrakoot, India.

Rambhadracharya is the head of Tulsi Peeth, and the lifelong chancellor of the Jagadguru Rambhadracharya Handicapped University. Rambhadracharya has been blind since the age of two months, but has never used Braille or any other aid to learn or compose. He can speak 22 languages. He has authored more than 90 books and 50 papers. He is regarded as one of the greatest authorities on Tulsidas in India, and is the editor of a critical edition of the Ramcharitmanas. He is a Katha artist for the Ramayana and the Bhagavata. His Katha programmes are held regularly in different cities in India and other countries, and are telecast on television channels like Sanskar TV and Sanatan TV.

Rambhadracharya has been honoured by several personalities and politicians, including A. P. J. Abdul Kalam Pranab Mukherjee, Draupadi Murmu, Indira Gandhi, Somnath Chatterjee, P. N. Bhagwati, Ramesh Chandra Lahoti, Marri Chenna Reddy, Shilendra Kumar Singh, Kurian Joseph, M. K. Kaw and Morari Bapu.

In 2015, Rambhadracharya was awarded Padma Vibhushan, India's second highest civilian honour. He won the Sahitya Akademi Award for Sanskrit, the Shreevani Alankaran, the Banabhatta award and the Vachaspati award for his epic Śrībhārgavarāghavīyam. He has received eight gold medals in Shastri and Acharya examinations.

Awards and honours bestowed on Rambhadracharya are listed below.

== Awards ==
Before Vairagi initiation

- 1974. Five gold medals at the Akhil Bharatiya Sanskrit Adhiveshan (All India Sanskrit Conference), New Delhi. Presented by Indira Gandhi, then Prime Minister of India.
- 1974. Gold Medal, Shastri (Bachelor of Arts) examination, awarded by the Sampurnanand Sanskrit University, Varanasi.
- 1976. Gold medal for standing first in all-India Sanskrit debate competition. Presented by Marri Chenna Reddy, then Governor of Uttar Pradesh.
- 1976. Cancellor's Gold Medal, awarded by the Sampurnanand Sanskrit University, Varanasi.
- 1976. Seven gold medals, Acharya (Master of Arts) examination, awarded by the Sampurnanand Sanskrit University, Varanasi.

After Vairagi initiation

- 1999. Kaviraj Vidya Narayan Shastri Archana-Samman Award, awarded by the Kaviraj Vidya Narayan Shastri Archana-Samman Committee, Bhagalpur, Bihar, for contributions to the Sanskrit language.
- 2000. Vishishta Puraskar, awarded by the Uttar Pradesh Sanskrit Sansthan, Lucknow.
- 2003. Ativishishta Puraskar, by the Uttar Pradesh Sanskrit Samsthana, Lucknow.
- 2003. Bhaurao Deoras Award, awarded by the Bhaurao Deoras Seva Nyas, Lucknow. He was given citations, traditional dresses and an award of Rs 58,000. Awarded at a simple function organised at the Saraswati Kunj in Nirala Nagar on March 17.
- 2003. Diwaliben Mehta Award for Progress in Religion, awarded by the Diwaliben Mehta Charitable Trust, Mumbai. Presented by P. N. Bhagwati, former Chief Justice of India.
- 2003. Rajshekhar Samman, awarded by the Madhya Pradesh Sanskrit Academy, Bhopal, for the Śrīrāghavakṛpābhāṣyam commentary on the Prasthānatrayī.
- 2004. Awadh Ratna, by the Awadh Vikas Parishad, Allahabad.
- 2004. President's Certificate of Honour or Badarayana Puraskar. Presented by A. P. J. Abdul Kalam, then President of India.
- 2005. Sahitya Akademi Award in Sanskrit for the epic Śrībhārgavarāghavīyam.
- 2006. Banabhatta Award, awarded by Madhya Pradesh Sanskrit Board, Bhopal, for the epic Śrībhārgavarāghavīyam.
- 2006. Shrivani Alankaran, awarded by the Jaydayal Dalmiya Shri Vani Trust for the epic Śrībhārgavarāghavīyam. Presented by Somnath Chatterjee, then Speaker of the Lok Sabha.
- 2007. Goswami Tulsidas Samarchan Samman, awarded by the Tulsi Research Institute, Allahabad. Presented by Ramesh Chandra Lahoti, former Chief Justice of India.
- 2007. Vachaspati Award, awarded by the K. K. Birla Foundation, New Delhi, for the epic Śrībhārgavarāghavīyam. It carried a prize money of one lakh rupees. Presented by Shilendra Kumar Singh, then Governor of Rajasthan.
- 2011. Devbhumi Award, awarded by the Government of Himachal Pradesh, Shimla. Presented by Kurian Joseph, then Chief Justice of the Himachal Pradesh High Court.
- 2011. Tulsi Award, awarded by Morari Bapu on the eve of Tulsi Jayanti, anniversary of the birth of Tulsidas.
- 2013. Purvanchal Ratna.
- 2015. Vishwa Bharati Award, awarded by the Government of Uttar Pradesh.
- 2021. Sahitya Akademi Fellowship, awarded by the Sahitya Akademi.
- 2023. Jnanpith Award, awarded by Bharatiya Jnanpith, presented by Draupadi Murmu, President of India.

== Honours ==
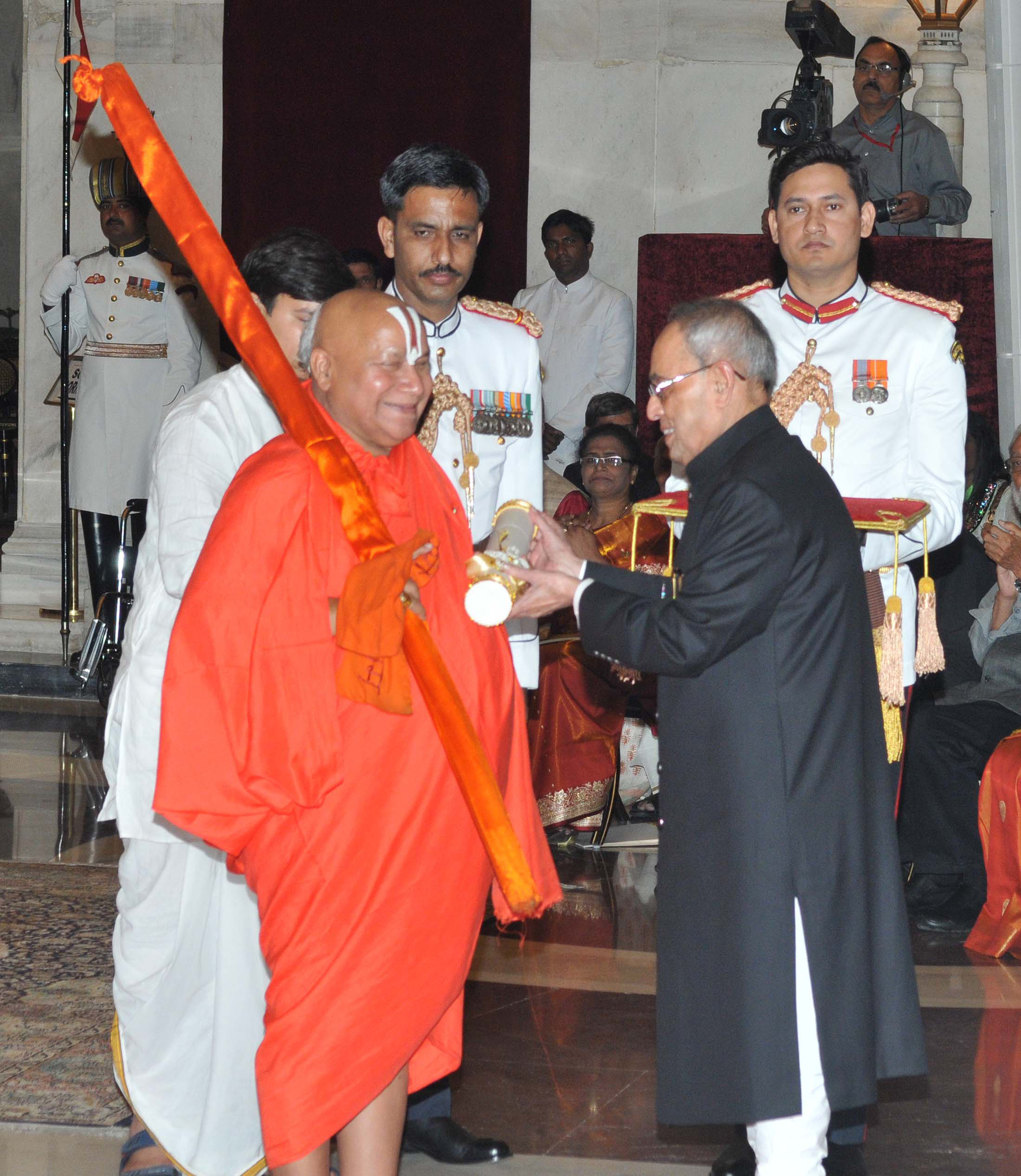
The President, Shri Pranab Mukherjee presenting the Padma Vibhushan Award to Jagadguru Swami Rambhadracharya, at a Civil Investiture Ceremony, at Rashtrapati Bhavan, in New Delhi on March 30, 2015.

- 1998. Dharmachakravarti, awarded by the World Religious Parliament, New Delhi, in recognition of meritorious contribution to world development.
- 1999. Mahakavi, awarded by the Akhil Bharatiya Hindi Bhasha Sammelan, Bhagalpur, Bihar, for invaluable contributions to the popularisation and enrichment of Hindi language, literature, and culture.
- 2000. Mahamahopadhyaya, conferred by the Shri Lal Bahadur Shastri National Sanskrit University, New Delhi. Presented by M. K. Kaw, the then Education Secretary of Ministry of Human Resource Development at the fourth convocation of the university on February 11.
- 2002. Kavikularatna, awarded by Sampurnanand Sanskrit University, Varanasi.
- 2006. Sanskrit Mahamahopadhyaya, awarded by the Hindi Sahitya Sammelan, Prayag.
- 2015. Padma Vibhushan, the second highest civilian honour of India, awarded by the Government of India.
- 2015. Yash Bharati, the highest civilian honour of Uttar Pradesh, awarded by the Government of Uttar Pradesh.

== See also ==
- List of Padma Vibhushan award recipients
- List of Sahitya Akademi Award winners for Sanskrit
- Works of Rambhadracharya

== Works cited ==
- Aneja, Mukta (2005). "Shri Ram Bhadracharyaji – A Religious Head With A Vision". In Kaul, J. K.; Abraham, George (eds.). Abilities Redefined – Forty Life Stories Of Courage And Accomplishment (PDF). Delhi, India: All India Confederation of the Blind. pp. 66–68. Archived from the original (PDF) on 3 September 2011.
- Chandra, R. (September 2008). "सम्मान और पुरस्कार" [Honours and Awards]. Kranti Bharat Samachar (in Hindi). 8 (11). Lucknow, Uttar Pradesh, India: Rajesh Chandra Pandey. RNI No. 2000, UPHIN 2638.
- Dinkar, Dr. Vagish (2008). श्रीभार्गवराघवीयम् मीमांसा [Investigation into Śrībhārgavarāghavīyam] (in Hindi). Delhi, India: Deshbharti Prakashan. ISBN 9788190827669.
- Dwivedi, Hazari Prasad (2007) [August 1981]. Dwivedi, Mukund (ed.). हज़ारी प्रसाद द्विवेदी ग्रन्थावली ३ [The Complete Works of Hazari Prasad Dwivedi Volume 3] (in Hindi) (3rd corrected and extended ed.). New Delhi: Rajkamal. ISBN 978-81-267-1358-5.
- Mishra, Gita Devi (August 2011). Sushil, Surendra Sharma (ed.). "पूज्यपाद जगद्गुरु जी को तुलसी एवार्ड २०११" [Tulsi Award 2011 to Honorable Jagadguru]. Shri Tulsi Peeth Saurabh (in Hindi). 15 (3). Ghaziabad, Uttar Pradesh, India: Shri Tulsi Peeth Seva Nyas.
- Nagar, Shanti Lal (2002). Sharma, Acharya Divakar; Goyal, Siva Kumar; Sushil, Surendra Sharma (eds.). The Holy Journey of a Divine Saint: Being the English Rendering of Swarnayatra Abhinandan Granth (First, Hardback ed.). New Delhi, India: B. R. Publishing Corporation. ISBN 81-7646-288-8.
- Prasad, Ram Chandra (1999) [First published 1991]. Sri Ramacaritamanasa The Holy Lake Of The Acts Of Rama (Illustrated, reprint ed.). Delhi, India: Motilal Banarsidass. ISBN 81-208-0762-6.
- Sharma, Dharam Veer (30 September 2010a). "Judgment in OOS No. 4 of 1989". Lucknow, Uttar Pradesh, India: Allahabad High Court (Lucknow Bench). Archived from the original on 27 August 2014.
- Sharma, Dharam Veer (30 September 2010b). "Annexure V". Lucknow, Uttar Pradesh, India: Allahabad High Court (Lucknow Bench). Archived from the original on 27 August 2014.
- Sushil, Surendra Sharma; Mishra, Abhiraj Rajendra (February 2011). Sushil, Surendra Sharma (ed.). "गीतरामायणप्रशस्तिः" [Praise of Gītarāmāyaṇam]. Shri Tulsi Peeth Saurabh (in Hindi). 14 (9). Ghaziabad, Uttar Pradesh, India: Shri Tulsi Peeth Seva Nyas.
