= Predhiman Krishan Kaw =

Indian physicist

- Born: 15 January 1948; Srinagar, Jammu and Kashmir, India
- Died: 18 June 2017 (aged 69)
- Education: Indian Institute of Technology; Princeton University; Physical Research Laboratory
- Known for: Plasma Physics Theory
- Awards: Shanti Swarup Bhatnagar Award; Padma Shri; TWAS Prize
- Scientific career
- Fields: Plasma Physics, Laser Physics
- Workplaces: Institute for Plasma Research
- Doctoral advisor: Prof. M. S. Sodha

Predhiman Krishan Kaw (15 January 1948 – 18 June 2017) was an Indian plasma physicist. He was the founding director of the Institute for Plasma Research and served as the institute's as the director from 1986 to 2012.

== Biography ==
Kaw was born on 15 January 1948 in Srinagar (Jammu and Kashmir), India. He matriculated from Punjab University (1958) and completed his M.Sc. from Agra University in 1964. He received a PhD from the Indian Institute of Technology, Delhi in 1966 under Supervision of Prof. M. S. Sodha, and was the first Ph.D. from the IIT, Delhi. Kaw received his Ph.D. at the age of 18, following which he completed his PostDoc at Princeton University. He was the founding director of the Institute for Plasma Research and served as the institute's as the director from 1986 to 2012. He was awarded the prestigious Padma Shri award, India's fourth-highest honor, in 1985 and the Shanti Swarup Bhatnagar Award in 1986. On 28 December 2016, he was awarded the Subrahmanyan Chandrasekhar Prize of Plasma Physics for his seminal contributions in the areas of laser-plasma interactions, strongly coupled dusty plasmas, and turbulence, nonlinear effect in magnetic fusion devices. He is also a recipient of the 2008 TWAS Prize. His older brother is bureaucrat and author M. K. Kaw.

== Professional details ==
| Year | Institute | Designation |
|---|---|---|
| 1967-1969 | Princeton University | Postdoctoral Fellow |
| 1969-1971 | Princeton University, USA | Research Staff & Lecturer |
| 1971-1974 | Physical Research Laboratory, India | Associate Professor |
| 1974-1975 | Physical Research Laboratory, India | Professor |
| 1975-1982 | Princeton University, USA | Principal Research Physicist Lecturer in Astrophysical Sciences |
| 1982-1986 | Plasma Physics Programme, Physical Research Laboratory, India | Director |
| 1986-2012 | Institute for Plasma Research, Gandhinagar, India | Director |
| 2012–2017 | Institute for Plasma Research, Gandhinagar, India | DST Year of Science Professor |

== Selected articles and talks ==
- PK Kaw, "Fusion power, who needs it?" (pdf format), Current Science, 10 July 1993, 65(01) 20 (web format)
