= Ananyata =

Ananyatā (Sanskrit:अनन्यता) means – 'having no equal', 'matchless', 'peerless', 'identity', 'sameness' It is a form of devotion in which the devotee is solely dependent on God. Ananyata is the doctrine that makes no distinction between God and the Atman.

Narada Bhakti Sutras No. IX and X read as follows :-

तस्मिन्ननन्यता तद्विरोधिशूदासीनता च |

" Inner stillness, furthermore, requires a single-hearted intention, and disinterest in what is antagonistic to spiritual devotion. "

अन्याश्रयाणां त्यागोऽनन्यता |

" When one is single-hearted, one relinquishes seeking security in anything other than God. "

With these words Nārada explains ananyatā as the state in which the mind of the devotee does not waver or goes astray, remains one-pointed ever steady in the contemplation of God to the exclusion of everything else, in that state everything is envisioned in God as His cosmic play.

For the Advaita Vedantists, ananyatā means absolute oneness or non-otherness of the individual self (Jiva) and the Universal Self (Brahman), the absolute height of enlightenment, atmaikatya which is the absolute identity of the phenomenal selves with the Supreme Self.
