= Kuldeep Joshi =

- कुलदीप जोशी
- Education: Bachelor of Music
- Alma mater: Jagadguru Rambhadracharya Handicapped University
- Known for: Playing Tabla continuously for 12 hours

Kuldeep Joshi is the first visually-impaired student in India to play tabla continuously for 12 hours. He is an alumnus of Jagadguru Rambhadracharya Divyanga University, UP.

== Personal life ==
Joshi is a native of the Dungarpur district of the Rajasthan state of India. He lost his eyesight at the age of eight. His father, Manshankar Joshi, is a physical education teacher and his mother, Sharada Devi, is a housewife.

He has two brothers. As of 2012, his elder brother was working in Mumbai and his younger brother was pursuing the Chartered Accountant course in Pune.
