= M. K. Kaw =

Indian civil servant (b. 1941, d. 2019)

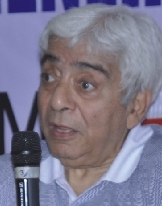

Secretary, Civil Aviation
- In office 1997–1998

Secretary, MHRD
- In office 1999-2001

Personal details
- Born: 10 November 1941 (age 84) Srinagar, Kashmir State
- Died: 28 October 2019 New Delhi, India
- Relatives: Predhiman Kaw
- Education: Panjab University, Agra University
- Occupation: Civil Servant, Author

Maharaj Krishen Kaw (also known as M. K. Kaw) (10 November 1941 – 28 October 2019) was an Indian bureaucrat and author who served as Secretary, Civil Aviation and Secretary, Ministry of Human Resource Development. An officer of the 1964 batch of the Indian Administrative Service, he served in numerous positions in the government of Himachal Pradesh and the Government of India.

== Early life and education ==
Kaw was born in Srinagar, then the capital of the princely state of Jammu and Kashmir, in 1941 to a family of Kashmiri Pandits. Kaw's family migrated to Delhi in the late 1940s in search of opportunities in newly independent India. Kaw proved academically adept and completed his matriculation exams at age 10 and obtained his master's degree in economics from Panjab University at age 16. He also obtained an LLB from Agra University.

== Personal life ==
He was married to Dr. Raj Kaw, a professor of Hindi at Ram Lal Anand College, University of Delhi. He had two children, Anurag (a cardiothoracic surgeon) and Iti (an IT professional). His younger siblings were the distinguished Indian physicist Predhiman Kaw and senior bureaucrat Asha Swarup (former Chief Secretary, Government of Himachal Pradesh).

== Career ==
Kaw entered the Indian Administrative Service in 1964 after securing an All India Rank of 13 in the 1963 Civil Service Examinations. After undergoing training at the LBSNAA, he was assigned to the Himachal Pradesh cadre of the IAS and completed a year's practical training in Bulandshahr district in Uttar Pradesh.

During his time in Himachal Pradesh, he served as the Deputy Commissioner of Kangra and Solan District, Director of Industries, Finance Secretary (1987–90) and Education Secretary (1984–87). He was also Principal Secretary to Virbhadra Singh, Chief Minister of Himachal Pradesh. While on deputation to the Central Government, he served in the Ministry of Rural Development, as Joint Secretary in the Ministry of Defence and as Additional Secretary in the Ministry of Finance. He also served as the Member Secretary of the Fifth Pay Commission which was chaired by Justice Ratnavel Pandian. The Commission recommended a general pay hike for several classes of government employees and also called for a 30% reduction in government staff. He superannuated in 2001 and retired as Secretary to the Government of India.

== Later life ==
While in service, Kaw was instrumental in pushing for the reservation of seats for Kashmiri Pandits in educational institutions in the wake of the Exodus of Kashmiri Hindus. From 2003 to 2009, he served as President of the All India Kashmiri Samaj and was instrumental in pushing for the Prime Ministerial Employment Package for displaced Kashmiri Pandits. A longtime devotee of Sathya Sai Baba, he served as the Dean of the Sri Sathya Sai International Centre for human values. He also served on a number of government advisory committees, particularly in the field of higher education. He died on 28 October 2019.

== Writings ==
Kaw was also a noted author, poet and columnist. A list of his works includes:

- Bureacrazy (1992)
- Bureacrazy Gets Crazier
- KawCaw: Silly Point (2014)
- The Sandalwood Door (1991)
- An Outsider Everywhere: Revelations of an Insider (2012)
- Science of Spirituality

One of his plays, Kehna Aasaan Hai, was converted by Doordarshan into a 13 episode serial.
