= Shrisitaramakelikaumudi =

श्रीसीतारामकेलिकौमुदी
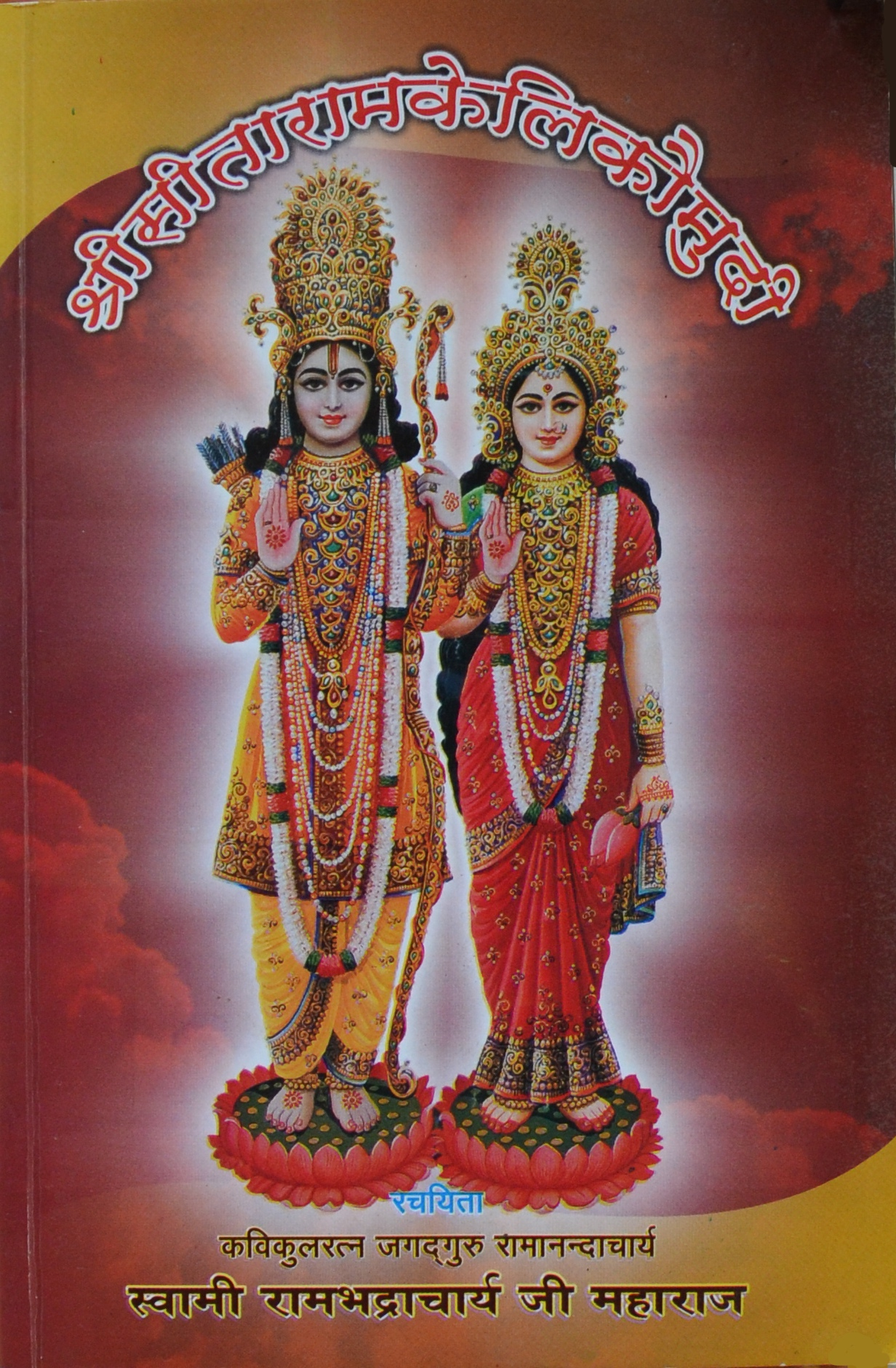
- Cover page of Śrīsītārāmakelikaumudī, first edition
- Author: Jagadguru Rambhadracharya
- Original title: Śrīsītārāmakelikaumudī
- Language: Hindi
- Genre: Rītikāvya (Procedural Poetry)
- Publisher: Jagadguru Rambhadracharya Handicapped University
- Publication date: August 16, 2008
- Publication place: India
- Media type: Print (paperback)
- Pages: 224 pp (first edition)

Śrīsītārāmakelikaumudī (Hindi: श्रीसीतारामकेलिकौमुदी) (2008), literally The moonlight (elucidation) for the [childhood] pastimes of Sītā and Rāma, is a minor poem in the Braja dialect of Hindi (with some verses in Maithili) belonging to the Rītikāvya genre. It was composed by Jagadguru Rambhadracharya (1950–) in the years 2007 and 2008. The work is set in the backdrop of the Bālakāṇḍa of Vālmīki's Rāmāyaṇa and Tulasīdāsa's Rāmacaritamānasa, and is an assortment of verses describing the activities, pastimes and major events during the childhood of Sītā and Rāma. Śrīsītārāmakelikaumudī consists of 324 verses divided in three parts of 108 verses each. The verses are composed in seven Prakrit metres, namely Amātrika, Kavitta, Gīta, Ghanākṣarī, Caupaiyā, Drumila, and Mattagajendra.

A copy of the epic with a Hindi commentary has been published by the Jagadguru Rambhadracharya Handicapped University, Chitrakuta, Uttar Pradesh. The book was released on October 30, 2008.

== Composition ==
Jagadguru Rambhadracharya mentions in the prologue of the work that he was traveling to Madhya Pradesh from Chitrakuta on November 25, 2007. He was listening to the poetry of Raskhan, being read out by his disciples. After reading some verses, two of his disciples asked him in why he could not compose such lyrical poetry describing the child forms of Sītā and Rāma, as Raskhan composed describing Kṛṣṇa. The poet accepted their "ingenuous yet challenging" request and composed the first verse almost a month later, on December 23, 2007, in the Kandivali (East) suburb of Mumbai. Till April 2008, he had time to compose just 67 verses of the first part, owing to a busy schedule. Then he happened to travel to Bihar for an 18-day-long Kathā programme in April–May. The poet completed the remaining 260 verses between April 19 and May 1, 2008, on the banks of the Kamala River in the Mithila region of Bihar.

== The three parts ==
The work is divided into three parts, called the three rays by the poet. The first ray is set in Ayodhyā and the subject is the birth (manifestation) of Rāma, followed by the pastimes and events from his childhood. The second ray is set in Mithilā, describing the manifestation, and childhood pastimes and events from the life of Sītā. The first half of the third ray is a description of messages exchanged by Sītā and Rāma through Nārada, and the second half describes Rāma's journey from Ayodhyā to Mithilā and culminates with the marriage of the princes of Ayodhyā with the princesses of Mithilā. Most of the verses describe a sight or activity using various figures of speech, while major events of are Rāmāyaṇa are summed up briefly.

At the end of each part, after the 108th verse, is a concluding 109th verse in which the poet presents a metaphor for the work, wishing that the Vaiṣṇavas in the form of cakora birds ever drink the moonlight of Śrīsītārāmakelikaumudī. In Indian literature, the cakora bird is said to subsist on moonbeams only. This final verse is the same in all the three parts.

=== Ray One ===
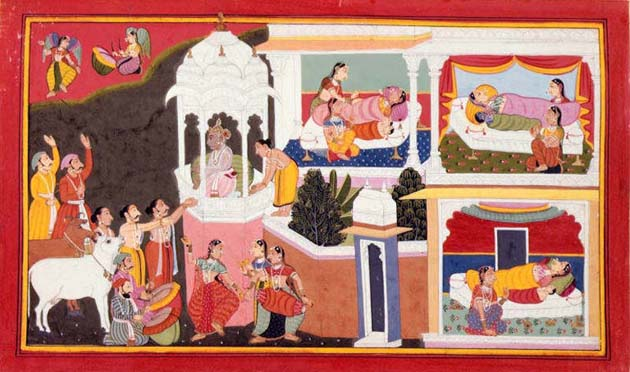
The manifestation of Rāma and his three brothers is described in Ray One.

The first ray (Hindi: प्रथम किरण) begins with an invocation of Sarasvatī and the poet expressing that his only faith is in the infant form of Rāma (verses 1 to 3). Verses 4 to 5 state that it is the very same Supreme God (Para Brahman) who is without any qualities (Nirguṇa Brahman) that manifests as Rāma who is with qualities (Saguṇa Brahman). The manifestation of Rāma as an infant from the womb of Kauśalyā on the day of Rāmanavamī is described in verses 6 to 18, with eight different similes from natural world forming verses 8 to 15. Verses 19 to 22 show Rāma in the care of Kauśalyā, while verses 23 and 24 show him in the arms of Vasiṣṭha, the Guru of the Raghu dynasty. The features of the baby are the subject of the verses 25 to 27. Verses 28 to 30 describe the festivities in Ayodhyā. Verse 31 shows Rāma in the lap of Kauśalyā. The Nāmakaraṇa Saṃskāra of the four brothers takes place in verse 32, with their features described in verse 33. Kauśalyā and Arundhatī play with Rāma in verses 34 to 38.

The next twenty nine verses (39 to 67) show various features, activities and pastimes of the child Rāma, like playing in the mud, bathing, baby talk, curly hair, clothes and ornaments, act of crawling, et cetera. In verses 68 to 70, the child Rāma falls ill and Kaikeyī and Kauśalyā, thinking it to be the result of a Tāntric charm, call Vasiṣṭha for a remedy. In verse 71, Vasiṣṭha chants the Narasiṃha Mantra and Rāma is cured. Verse 72 shows Rāma in the lap of Daśaratha. Verses 73 to 80 form a conversation between Kaikeyī and Rāma, where the child Rāma requests Kaikeyī for the toy in the sky (the moon) – Kaikeyī makes up several excuses for each of which Rāma has an answer. Once again, in verses 81 to 94, the features, activities and pastimes of the child Rāma are described. In verses 95 to 98, Rāma begins to learn the art of archery, first using a bow made of wooden skewer, and later using an actual bow given by Daśaratha. Looking at his prowess with the bow, Vasiṣṭha predicts that the boy will grow up to be the slayer of the demons and Rāvaṇa. Verse 101 shows Rāma playing with his friends on the banks of the Sarayū river.

The Yajñopavīta Saṃskāra of the four brothers takes place in verses 102 and 103. In the next four verses (103 to 107), the four brothers go to the Āśrama of Vasiṣṭha to study the Vedas and come back home after their Samāvartana Saṃskāra. In the 108th verse, the four princes are shown in the palace of Daśaratha, endowed with knowledge and a virtuous character.

=== Ray Two ===
The initial verses (1 to 14) of Ray Two (Hindi: द्वितीय किरण) have the region of Mithilā, the city of Janaka and the place of Puṇyāraṇya as their subject. In verses 15 to 23, the manifestation of Sītā on Sītānavamī day as Janaka ploughs the fields of Puṇyāraṇya is described. The festivities in Mithilā come next (verses 24 to 28), followed by the description of the infant's features by the women of Mithilā (verses 29 to 31). Verses 32 to 35 deal with the infant Sītā in the care of Janaka and his wife Sunainā. The beauty of the baby and her activities are described in verses 36 to 45. Verse 46 is about her Annaprāśana ceremony. Two more verses on the child's charm (47 and 48) are followed by her Karṇavedha rite (verse 49), and then another five verses on Sītā's playful activities (50 to 54).

Verse 55 describes Sītā with her three sisters (Māṇḍavī, Ūrmilā, and Śrutikīrti) and eight companions. Her play on the banks of the river, with dolls and in the courtyard of Janaka is the subject of verses 56 to 60. In verses 61 to 67, Sunainā adorns Sītā with a Sari and other ornaments, thinking about Rāma as her future groom. Verses 68 to 72 once describe Sītā's beauty, charm and glory. Sītā's devotion and love for Rāma is described in verses 73 to 76. Her mixing up with the children of the commoners in Mithilā form verses 77 to 79. The service of the cows and a painting of Rāma is described in verses 80 and 81. Verses 82 to 89 describe the interactions of Sītā with the girls, boys and women of Mithilā, along with her daily routine. The way the child Sītā eats her food is the subject of verse 90. Verses 91 to 100 deal with her love for nature – the rainy season, the trees and the creepers, and her disapproval of materialism and greed.

In verses 101 to 108, the dragging of the Pināka by Sītā is described. Sītā sees the onerous bow of Śiva being worshipped in Mithilā asks Janaka about it. On learning its history, she drags the bow and plays with it like a toy horse, to the great amazement of Janaka.

=== Ray Three ===
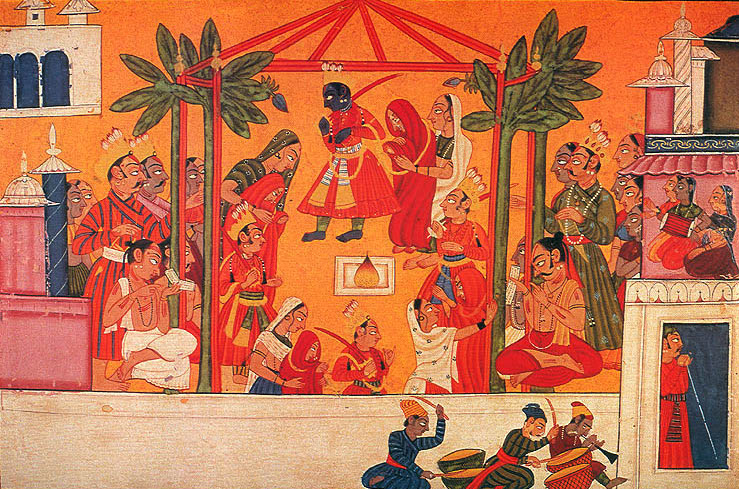
The four sons of Daśaratha get married with the four daughters of Sīradhvaja and Kuśadhvaja at the end of Ray Three.

Ray Three (Hindi: तृतीय किरण) begins with the description of a young Sītā in verses 1 to 5. In verses 6 to 9, the sage Nārada visits Sītā in Mithilā and carries a message from her to Rāma in Ayodhyā. The description and glory of Ayodhyā is the topic in verses 10 to 14. In verses 15 to 20, the sight (Darśana) of the child Rāma playing with his friends and brothers is described, as seen by Nārada. The conversation between Nārada and Rāma happens in verses 21 and 22. This is followed by Sītā's message to Rāma in verses 23 to 31. In verses 32 and 33, Rāma sends a message in reply to Sītā through Nārada, the contents of which are in verses 34 to 42. Nārada returns to Brahmaloka in verse 43. Verses 44 to 51 deal with Sītā's feelings of separation and her longing to see Rāma.

In verses 52 and 53, Sītā ordains Śiva to reveal the Rāmarakṣāstotra to sage Viśvāmitra. Viśvāmitra writes the Stotra as dictated by Śiva in his dream and goes to Ayodhyā in verse 54. The sight of Rāma by Viśvāmitra is forms the verses 55 to 58. In verses 59 to 63, Viśvāmitra asks Daśaratha for Rāma and Lakṣmaṇa, who is first distraught over the demand but is then convinced by Vasiṣṭha. Nine events of the Rāmāyaṇa between the brothers departure from Ayodhyā and their arrival in Mithilā with Viśvāmitra are briefly summarized in verse 64.

In verse 65 Rāma and Lakṣmaṇa set out to see the capital city of Mithilā. The maidens of Mithilā, friends of Sītā, see the two princes and sing of their charm in verses 66 to 71. Early morning on the next day, Rāma requests Viśvāmitra to allow the brothers to get flowers for his service (verses 72 to 77). The next three verses (78 to 80) show the two brothers in the garden of Janaka. From verse 81 to 87, the conversation between Rāma and the gardeners of Mithilā is described. Sītā, sent by her mother Sunayanā to pray to Pārvatī, enters the garden with her friends and comes face to face with Rāma. Their first meeting is the subject of verses 88 to 100, with the poet stating their Advaita (non-duality) in verses 96 and 97. In verses 101 and 102, both Sītā and Rāma leave the garden for the temple and Viśvāmitra's place respectively. In verse 103, the blessing of Sītā by Pārvatī, the breaking of Śiva's bow by Rāma, and the meeting of Paraśurāma and Rāma is briefly summarized. In verses 104 to 108, the marriage of the four Raghu princes – Rāma, Lakṣmaṇa, Bharata and Śatrughna – takes place with the four princesses – Sītā, Ūrmilā, Māṇḍavī and Śrutikīrti respectively; and the couples come home to Ayodhyā.

== Poetic Features ==
=== Prosody ===
==== Short syllabled verses ====
There are three verses in the second ray (2.3, 2.4 and 2.18) of Śrīsītārāmakelikaumudī composed in the Ghanākṣarī metre using only short syllables. An examples is –

Devanagari
तहँ बस बसुमति बसु बसुमुखमुख
निगदित निगम सुकरम धरमधुर ।
दुरित दमन दुख शमन सुख गमन
परम कमन पद नमन सकल सुर ॥
बिमल बिरति रति भगति भरन भल
भरम हरन हरि हरष हरम पुर ।
गिरिधर रघुबर घरनि जनम महि
तरनि तनय भय जनक जनकपुर ॥

IAST
tahaँ basa basumati basu basumukhamukha
nigadita nigama sukarama dharamadhura ।
durita damana dukha śamana sukha gamana
parama kamana pada namana sakala sura ॥
bimala birati rati bhagati bharana bhala
bharama harana hari haraṣa harama pura ।
giridhara raghubara gharani janama mahi
tarani tanaya bhaya janaka janakapura ॥

Giridhara says – there (in Mithilā) is settled the city of Janaka which is the crest-jewel (vasu) of the earth (vasumati); the upholder of the Karma as enunciated by the Brāhmaṇas (vasumukhamukhas – the mouths of Agni, who is the chief among the Vasus) and righteousness; the subduer of sins; the destroyer of sorrows; the pleasant destination; supremely spectacular; whose feet are bowed down to by all deities; the good nourisher of pure [forms of] abstention, love and devotion; the remover of doubts; the palace for the pleasure of Rāma; the birthplace of the paramour of the best amongst Raghus; and the cause of fear in [even] the son of Sūrya (Yama, the deity of death). ॥ 2.3 ॥

In his Sanskrit epic poem Śrībhārgavarāghavīyam, the poet has composed seven such short-syllabled verses in the Acaladhṛti (Gītyāryā) metre.
