= Mahendra Singh Sodha =

Indian physicist (1932–2024)

- Born: 8 February 1932; India
- Died: 12 October 2024 (aged 92)
- Known for: Plasma Physics Theory
- Awards: Shanti Swarup Bhatnagar Award; Padma Shri; Hari Om Prerit S. S. Bhatnagar Award; Pioneer in Renewable Energy Award; Dr. K. S. Rao Memorial National Award
- Scientific career
- Fields: Plasma Physics, Laser Physics

Mahendra Singh Sodha (8 February 1932 – 12 October 2024), popularly known as M. S. Sodha, was an Indian physicist specialising in plasma, optics and energy and the Vice-chancellor of Lucknow University, Devi Ahilya University and Barkatullah University. A 1974 winner of the highest Indian science award, the Shanti Swarup Bhatnagar Prize, Sodha was honoured by the Government of India again in 2003 with Padma Shri, the fourth highest Indian civilian award.

== Biography ==
M. S. Sodha, born on 8 February 1932, secured his master's degree (MSc) in physics in 1951 from Allahabad University and started his career as a junior scientist by joining the Defence Science Laboratory, New Delhi, present day Laser Science and Technology Centre, in 1953. During the same period, he pursued his doctoral studies and obtained a doctoral degree (DPhil) in 1955 from the same university. He continued at DSL till 1956 and moved to the University of British Columbia, Canada as a post doctoral fellow to stay there till 1958, when he shifted to USA, to work as senior scientist at the Armour Research Foundation, Chicago, till 1961 and then as a senior scientist and chief of physics at the Republic Aviation Company, New York. In 1964, he returned to India and joined the Indian Institute of Technology, Delhi as the professor where he rose in ranks to become the dean, head of the department and finally, a deputy director of the institution till his retirement in 1992. During this period, he also served as the vice chancellor of Devi Ahilya University from 1988 to 1992. In 1992, he was appointed the vice chancellor of Lucknow University for a three-year term from 1992 to 1995 and, later, at the Barkatullah University from 1998 to 2000. He has also served as a visiting professor at Drexel University and was a visiting professor and Ramanna Fellow of Lucknow University. Sodha died on 12 October 2024, at the age of 92.

== Legacy ==
Sodha did extensive research in the physical science disciplines of plasma and energy. He is credited with pioneering researches on colloidal plasmas, optics and Akhamanov's formulation and he presented papers on quantitative theory of image formation in layered media. His book, Microwave Propagation in Ferrimagnetics is reported to be the first book on the subject. He has also published 13 books including Solar Crop Drying, Solar Distillation and Solar Passive Building: Science and Design and had edited a book, Sodha Reviews of Renewable Energy Resources. He has also published over 500 research papers in peer reviewed journals and mentored several students for their doctoral studies.

Sodha contributed to the establishment of divisions such as the Centre of Energy Studies and Research, Opto-Electronics Group and Plasma Physics Group at the Indian Institute of Technology, Delhi. During his tenure as the vice chancellor of Lucknow University and Devi Ahilya Vishwavidyalaya, he was instrumental in introducing self-financing as an option for academic studies and reportedly played a part in the establishment of Faculty of Engineering Science at Devi Ahalya Vishavidyalaya. He served as the president of Plasma Science Society of India and Optical Society of India.

== Awards and recognitions ==
Sodha was an elected fellow of the Indian National Science Academy and the National Academy of Sciences, India. He achieved the highest Indian science award, Shanti Swarup Bhatnagar Prize for Physics in 1974. Four years later, he received Hari Om Prerit S. S. Bhatnagar Award followed by the Pioneer in Renewable Energy Award from the World Renewable Energy Network and UNESCO in 2002. The Government of India honoured him in 2003 with the civilian award of Padma Shri. He received Dr. K. S. Rao Memorial National Award in 2004. Sodha was felicitated by the Indian Institute of Technology, Delhi on 21 March 2011 at the Honour the Mentor program.

== See also ==
- Plasma physics
- Optics
