= Gitaramayanam =

2011 poem by Jagadguru Rambhadracharya

गीतरामायणम्
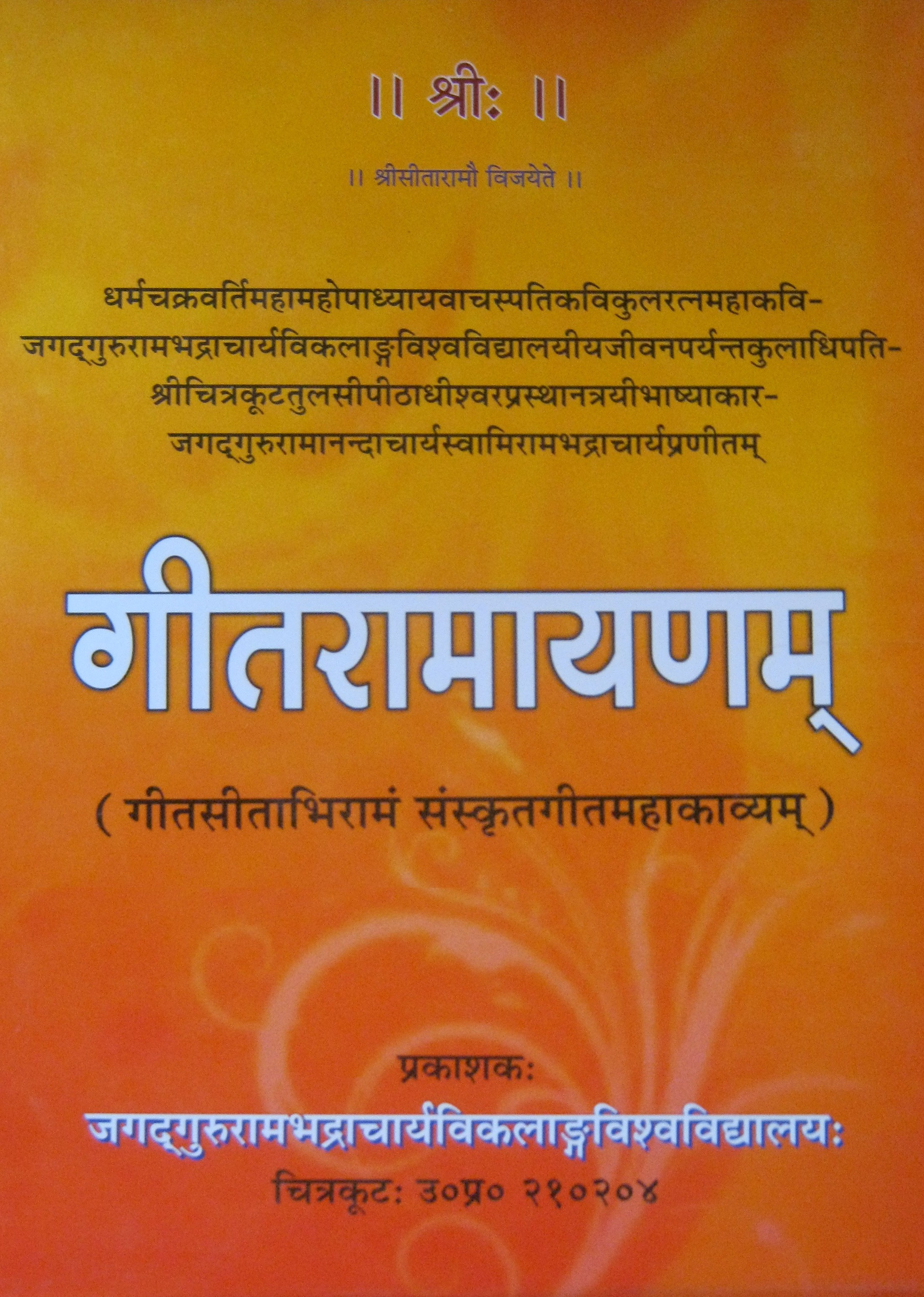
- Cover page of Gītarāmāyaṇam, first edition
- Author: Jagadguru Rambhadracharya
- Original title: Gītarāmāyaṇam
- Language: Sanskrit
- Genre: Epic Poetry
- Publisher: Jagadguru Rambhadracharya Handicapped University
- Publication date: January 14, 2011
- Publication place: India
- Media type: Print (hardcover)
- Pages: 998 pp (first edition)

Gītarāmāyaṇam (Sanskrit: गीतरामायणम्) (2011), literally The Rāmāyaṇa in songs, is a Sanskrit epic poem (Mahākāvya) of the Gītakāvya (lyrical poetry) genre, composed by Jagadguru Rambhadracharya (1950–) in the years 2009 and 2010. It consists of 1008 songs in Sanskrit which are divided into seven Kāṇḍas (books), every Kāṇḍa being sub-divided into one or more Sargas (cantos). There are 28 cantos in all, and each canto consists of 36 songs. The songs of the epic are based on rhythms and tunes or Rāgas found in the folk music and classical music of India. In the epic, each song in sung by one or more characters of the Rāmāyaṇa or by the poet. The songs progressively narrate the Rāmāyaṇa via monologues, dialogues and multilogues. There are occasional Sanskrit verses between the songs, which take the narrative forward.

A copy of the epic with a Hindi commentary by the poet was published by the Jagadguru Rambhadracharya Handicapped University, Chitrakuta, Uttar Pradesh. The book was released by the Sanskrit poet Abhirāja Rājendra Miśra at Chitarkuta on the Makara Saṅkrānti day of January 14, 2011.

== Structure ==
The work begins with four verses in the Maṅgalācaraṇa. The poet invokes the blessings of Rāma in the first two verses, and Hanumān in the third verse. In the final verse, the work Gītarāmāyaṇam is introduced.

=== Bālakāṇḍam ===
Canto I. Stutasītārāmacandraḥ (Sanskrit: स्तुतसीतारामचन्द्रः), literally the canto with Sītā and Rāma eulogized.

Song(s)	Singer	Subject
1–3,8,9–27,28,29	Rāmabhadrācārya	Praise of Sītā and Rāma
4	Rāmabhadrācārya	Daśāvatārastutiḥ, praise of the ten Avatāras of Rāma, similar to the Daśāvatārakīrtidhavalam in Gītagovindam
5–7	Rāmabhadrācārya	Prayers to Rāma
30–36	Rāmabhadrācārya	Praise of Bharata, Lakṣmaṇa, Hanumān, Vālmīki, Tulasīdāsa, Ayodhyā and Citrakūṭa respectively

Canto II. Gītarāghavāvirbhāvaḥ (Sanskrit: गीतराघवाविर्भावः), literally the canto with the songs of Rāma's manifestation.

Song(s)	Singer	Subject
1,4	Rāmabhadrācārya	Praise of Rāmāyaṇa and birth of Hanumān.
2–3	Devatās, Rāma	Devatās request Rāma for an Avatāra, Rāma assures them about his Avatāra in the dynasty of Raghu
5	Agni	Presentation of the Pāyasa by Agni to Daśaratha.
6,10–17,19	Rāmabhadrācārya	The manifestation of Rāma, description of the infant and the festivities in Ayodhyā on the Rāmanavamī day
7–9	Kausalyā	Address to and praise of the infant Rāma.
18	Nāpitī (barber's woman)	The Nāpitī's demands Kasualyās bracelet as remuneration for cutting the nails of the infant Rāma
20	Vadhu	A housewife of Ayodhyā tells her mother-in-law about the auspiciousness of Rāmanavamī
21–23,26–30,35–36	Rāmabhadrācārya	The Rāmanavamī day, the Vardhāpana ceremony (the cutting of the umbilical cord) of Rāma, description of the infant
24–25	Sarasvatī	Sarasvatī, disguised as a midwife, performs the Vardhāpana of Rāma and demands Kausalyā's Sari as a reward
32–34	Sākhī (a maiden)	The Jātakarman Saṃskāra, Ṣaṣṭhī (sixth day) and Dvādaśī (twelfth day) of the brothers

Canto III. Gītarāghavaśiśukeliḥ (Sanskrit: गीतराघवशिशुकेलिः), literally the canto with the songs of infant Rāma's pastimes.

Song(s)	Singer	Subject
1,3–8,11	Rāmabhadrācārya	The Nāmakaraṇa Saṃskāra (naming) of the four brothers by Vasiṣṭha, and description of Rāma with Kausalyā
2	Vasiṣṭha	Prayer to Rāma.
9–10,16	Kausalyā, Sumitrā	The mothers wish Rāma to grow up soon.
12–13,23	Sakhī	The Bahirniṣkramaṇa saṃskāra of the four brothers, Rāma in the lap of Daśaratha
14–15, 30	Daśaratha	Monologue by Daśaratha about his great fortune
17–18	Kinnaras, Rāmabhadrācārya	Kajjalī describing Rāma on a swing
19–20	Kausalyā	Request to her companions to move the swing slowly
21–22,24–26,31	Rāmabhadrācārya	Rāma on the swing, in the courtyard of Daśaratha and in the care of Kausalyā
27–29,32	Kausalyā	Urges Daśaratha to take a look at Rāma sitting in the courtyard, describes Rāma playing in the mud
33–35	Kausalyā	Kausalyā sees Rāma simultaneously at two places during his Annaprāśana Saṃskāra, surrenders to Rāma
36	Rāma	Rāma reveals his form to Kausalyā and asks her not to fear – rather meditate on his form

Canto IV. Gītarāghavabālalīlaḥ (Sanskrit: गीतराघवबाललीलः), literally the canto with the songs of child Rāma's play.

Song(s)	Singer	Subject
1,3–4	Rāmabhadrācārya	Rāma begins to walk, description of Rāma being given a bath and ornaments by the three mothers
2	Kaikeyī	Description of the four brothers playing
5	Nārada	Fortune of Daśaratha and the three queens
6–7	Kausalyā, Rāma	Rāma is amused on seeing the moon and asks for it
8–13	Kausalyā, Kaikeyī, Sumitrā	The mothers sing lullabies to make Rāma sleep. Kausalyā sings to wake up Rāma in the morning.
14,16–17,20	Rāmabhadrācārya	Arundhatī marks a Tilaka on Rāma's forehead, description of Rāma playing and having a meal.
15,22	Sakhī	Rāma going out to play with his brothers
18	Lakṣmaṇa	Invites Rāma out to play
19,21	Kaikeyī	Requests Rāma not to go far, description of the brothers' play
23,25	Vasiṣṭha	Karṇavedha and Cūḍākaraṇa Saṃskāras of the four brothers
24,28	Rāmabhadrācārya	Description of Rāma after his Karṇavedha, Sarasvatī teaches Rāma the Śiva Sūtras
26–27	Kausalyā	Runs after Rāma to catch hold of him
29	Rāma	Requests parents for the Yajñopavīta
30	Kausalyā	Pleads Daśaratha for the Yajñopavīta of Rāma
31–32	Sarasvatī	The Upanayana Saṃskāra of the four brothers
33	Vasiṣṭha's disciples	Welcome Rāma to the Āśrama of Vasiṣṭha
34–35	Rāmabhadrācārya	Rāma and the brothers learn from Vasiṣṭha, being cared for by Arundhatī
36	Vasiṣṭha	Requests Rāma to return home after completion of his learning

Canto V. Gītasītāvirbhāvaḥ (Sanskrit: गीतसीताविर्भावः), literally the canto with the songs of Sītā's manifestation.

Song(s)	Singer	Subject
1–4, 9–11	Rāmabhadrācārya	Praise of Mithilā, manifestation of Sītā on Sītānavami day, celebrations in Mithilā
5–8	Nārada	Praises Sītā and requests her to assume an infant's form, praise of Janaka and Mithilā
12	Sakhī	Sītā playing in Mithilā
13	Sunayanā	Description of the happiness in Mithilā since Sītā's manifestation
14	Maitreyī	Praise of Sunayana's fortune and Sītā
15–16	Rāmabhadrācārya	Sītā's beauty and her care by Sunayanā
17	Sunayanā	Wishes Sītā to grow up soon
18–20	Rāmabhadrācārya	Sītā playing in Mithilā
21–28	Yājñavalkya	Fortune of Janaka, Nāmakaraṇa of Sītāa, description of her virtues, and revelation that she is the Ādi Śakti
29–30	Sītā	Sītā teaches two pet birds - a myna and a parrot
31	Sītā	Description of a vision of Rāma in her dream to Sunayanā
32	Rāmabhadrācārya	Sītā paints Rāma as she saw in her dream
33–34	Sunayanā	Wishes Rāma to be Sītā's groom, asks Sītā to worship Pārvatī
35	Rāmabhadrācārya	Sītā's beauty
36	Sītā	Prayer to Rāma

Canto VI. Gītayugalakaiśorakaḥ (Sanskrit: गीतयुगलकैशोरकः), literally the canto with the songs of the youthful duo.

Song(s)	Singer	Subject
1–5	Rāmabhadrācārya	Sītā longs to see Rāma in person
6	Sītā	Describes the qualities of her desired groom to Nārada
7	Nārada	Description of Rama's virtues
8–10	Sītā	Asks Nārada how she can meet Rama, and the concept of Avatāra of the Brahman
11–17	Nārada	Explains the notion of Avatāra of Brahman, Saguṇa and Nirguṇa aspects, and Sītā being Rama's Bhakti. Prophesizes Rāma's arrival in Mithilā to break the bow of Śiva
18–19	Sītā	Tells a companion about her desire to see Rāma
20	Sītā	Asks an astrologer, who is Śiva in disguise, about her future
21–28	Sītā	Sītā's letter to Rama, delivered by Śukadeva in the form of a parrot, requesting Rāma to come to Mithilā
29–36	Rāma	Rāma's reply to Sītā, assuring him of his arrival in Mithilā

Canto VII. Gītasītāsvayaṃvaropakramaḥ (Sanskrit: गीतसीतास्वयंवरोपक्रमः), literally the canto with the songs of the commencement of Sītā's Svayaṃvara.

Song(s)	Singer	Subject
1	Sītā	Question from Janaka regarding the Shiva Dhanusha
2	Rāmabhadrācārya	Image of Sita pulling Shiva Dhanusha
3	Rāmabhadrācārya	Sage Viśvāmitra's vision of four brothers playing on the banks of Saryu
4,6,7	Viśvāmitra	Rāma Prem, arrival of Rāma in the court, demanding Rāma and Lakṣmaṇa from Daśaratha
5	Chāraṇa	Song of glory of Rāma sitting in the court
8,9	Daśaratha	Refusing to give Rāma and Lakṣmaṇa to Viśvāmitra
10	Vasiṣṭha, other Brāhmaṇas	Farewell to Rāma and Lakṣmaṇa
11,12	Devatās	Scene of Rāma and Lakṣmaṇa walking away with Viśvāmitra, prayer to nature to bring joy to Rāma
13	Rāmabhadrācārya	Glory song of Rāma, the destroyer of Tāḍakā and Subāhu and the savior of the yajna
14,16	Ahilyā	Prayer to Rāma to return, then a Rāma Stuti
15	Viśvāmitra	Prayer to Rāma for the salvation of Gautam's wife Ahilyā
17	People of Mithilā	Praise of Rāma and Lakṣmaṇa
18	Rāmabhadrācārya	Rāma Darshan by the people of Mithila
19-21	Janaka, Viśvāmitra	Inquiry about Rāma, Lakṣmaṇa from Viśvāmitra, Introduction by Viśvāmitra
22	Janaka's ministers	Praise of Rāma and Lakṣmaṇa
23,24	Lakṣmaṇa, Rāma	Lakṣmaṇa's desire to see Janakpur to Rāma, Praise of Janakpur by Rāma
24,36	Children of Mithilā	Visit of Rāma and Lakṣmaṇa to Mithila
26-34	Sītā's eight friends	Song the beauty and virtue of Rāma and Lakṣmaṇa, wishing for marriage of Sītā and Rāma, requesting Rāma to come to the flower garden
35	Brāhmaṇa, Ministers	Welcoming Rāma in the Dhanuṣayajñaśālā

Canto VIII. Gītasītānīketakaḥ (Sanskrit: गीतसीतानिकेतकः), literally the canto with the songs of Sītā's consort.

Canto IX. Gītasītāsvayaṃvaraḥ (Sanskrit: गीतसीतास्वयंवरः), literally the canto with the songs of Sītā's Svayaṃvara.

Canto X. Gītasītārāmapariṇayaḥ (Sanskrit: गीतसीतारामपरिणयः), literally the canto with the songs of the Sītā's marriage with Rāma.

Canto XI. Gītasītārāmapratyudgamotsavaḥ (Sanskrit: गीतसीतारामप्रत्युद्गमोत्सवः), literally the canto with the songs of the festivities at the return of Sītā and Rāma.

=== Ayodhyākāṇḍam ===
Canto XII. Śrīsītārāmavanavihāraḥ

Canto XIII. Śrīsītārāmaholīvihāraḥ

Canto XIV. Śrīsītārāmadolotsavaḥ

Canto XV. Gītaṣaḍṛtuvarṇanaḥ

Canto XVI. Gītarāṣṭradaivataḥ

Canto XVII. Gītarāghavavanavāsaḥ

Canto XVIII. Gītapathikābhīṣṭhaḥ

Canto XIX. Gītāyodhyakavirahālambanaḥ

Canto XX. Gītacitrakūṭamaṇḍanaḥ

=== Araṇyakāṇḍam ===
Canto XXI. Gītalalitanaralīlaḥ

=== Kiṣkindhākāṇḍam ===
Canto XXII. Gītamārutijayaḥ

=== Sundarakāṇḍam ===
Canto XXIII. Gītahanumatparākramaḥ

Canto XXIV. Gītaśaraṇāgatavatsalaḥ

=== Yuddhakāṇḍam ===
Canto XXV. Gītaraṇakarkaśaḥ

Canto XXVI. Gītarāvaṇāriḥ

=== Uttarakāṇḍam ===
Canto XXVII. Gītapaṭṭābhiṣekaḥ

Canto XXVIII. Gītarājādhirājaḥ

== Example song ==
In the following song (1.4.6), the child Rāma asks Kausalyā why the moon appears dark.

Devanāgarī
शशाङ्के कुतः श्यामता जाता ।
पृच्छति जननीमतिकुतूहलाद्बालस्त्रिभुवनत्राता ॥
कृष्णमृगस्तव शरभयाद्विधुं यातो नैतन्मातः ।
कपटमृगं प्रणिहन्मि नापरं तस्य विमोहख्यातः ॥
दशमुखभयाद्भुवो याता या विधुं श्यामता दृष्टा ।
कथं राहुभीतोऽसौ पायान्मही मूढतास्पृष्टा ॥
त्वमथ वीक्ष्य चन्द्रमसं निजदयिताननरूपसमानम् ।
शशिनि गतो श्यामः किल दृष्टः कर्तुं तदधरपानम् ॥
नहि मातः पीये तव स्तनं श्रुत्वा मनुजेन्द्राणी ।
सस्मितमुखी विस्मिता जाता चकिता गिरिधरवाणी ॥

IAST
śaśāṅke kutaḥ śyāmatā jātā ।
pṛcchati jananīmatikutūhalādbālastribhuvanatrātā ॥
kṛṣṇamṛgastava śarabhayādvidhuṃ yāto naitanmātaḥ ।
kapaṭamṛgaṃ praṇihanmi nāparaṃ tasya vimohakhyātaḥ ॥
daśamukhabhayādbhuvo yātā yā vidhuṃ śyāmatā dṛṣṭā ।
kathaṃ rāhubhītoऽsau pāyānmahī mūḍhatāspṛṣṭā ॥
tvamatha vīkṣya candramasaṃ nijadayitānanarūpasamānam ।
śaśini gato śyāmaḥ kila dṛṣṭaḥ kartuṃ tadadharapānam ॥
nahi mātaḥ pīye tava stanaṃ śrutvā manujendrāṇī ।
sasmitamukhī vismitā jātā cakitā giridharavāṇī ॥

The protector of the three worlds, the child Rāma asks Kausalyā with great inquisitiveness, “Whence the darkness in the moon?” The mother says, “A blackbuck has entered the moon, afraid of your arrows.” Rāma says, “Not thus, mother. I slay only the deer in the disguise (Mārīca) – whose delusion is renowned, and no other.” Kausalyā says, “Pṛthvī has gone into the moon out of the fear of Rāvaṇa, which is the darkness seen in the moon.” Rāma says, “How can the Candra, himself afraid of Rāhu protect someone, surely Pṛthvī is not naive.” Kausalyā then says “You saw the moon to be similar to the face of your bride, hence you have entered the moon to kiss your wife, and hence the moon appears dark.” Rāma says, “No mother, its only your milk that I drink, so how is the moon dark?” On hearing this, the queen smiled and the speech of Giridhara was amazed. ॥ 1.3.6 ॥
