= Jagadguru Rambhadracharya Divyanga University =

Public State Government University in Chitrakoot, Uttar Pradesh, India

- Former name: Jagadguru Rambhadracharya Handicapped University
- Motto in English: The duty of service is most difficult
- Established: 27 September 2001
- Affiliations: UGC, AIU, NAAC
- Chancellor: Jagadguru Rambhadracharya
- Vice-Chancellor: Shishir Kumar Pandey
- Students: 1100
- Location: Chitrakoot, Uttar Pradesh, India; 25°11′44″N 80°52′21″E
- Campus: Urban
- Website: https://www.jrdsu.up.gov.in/
- Location within Uttar Pradesh Location within India

Jagadguru Rambhadracharya Divyanga University (JRDU; formerly Jagadguru Rambhadracharya Handicapped University) is a public state government university in Chitrakoot, Uttar Pradesh, India. It was established in 2001 by Jagadguru Rambhadracharya as an educational institution for disabled people.

== History ==
On 23 August 1996, Swami Rambhadracharya established the Tulasi School for the Blind in Chitrakoot. After this, he decided to establish an institution of higher learning solely for disabled students. With this aim, he founded the Jagadguru Rambhadracharya Handicapped University on 27 September 2001 in Chitrakoot, Uttar Pradesh. The foundation stone was laid on 2 April 2001. The university was inaugurated by Rajnath Singh on 26 July 2011. The planned name was Chitrakoot Handicapped University (CHU), but later Jagadguru Rambhadracharya Handicapped University was chosen. It is run by the Jagadguru Rambhadracharya Viklang Shikshan Sansthan trust.

In 2022, Jagadguru Rambhadracharya expressed his intention to make the University into a UP state government. He suggested UP CM Yogi Adityanath ji takeover this University as State Public University. In June 2023, Uttar Pradesh government accorded status of State government university by passing Law in UP State assembly i.e. The Uttar Pradesh Jagadguru Rambhadracharya Divyang State University. Act, 2023 under Department of Divyangjan under which 50 percent of Divyang students and 50 percent of other students can be admitted to the University. It was the only university in the world exclusively for disabled people until the establishment of Dr. Shakuntala Misra National Rehabilitation University at Lucknow (Uttar Pradesh, India).

Formation

The university was founded initially by the JRHU ordinance, enacted by the governor of Uttar Pradesh on 7 August 2001. The ordinance was replaced by the JRHU Act passed on 5 October 2001. The act appointed Jagadguru Rambhadracharya as the lifelong chancellor of JRHU. Classes began on 23 August 2001. In 2002, it was granted membership in the Association of Indian Universities, New Delhi.

Support

The Government of Uttar Pradesh and the University Grants Commission (UGC) supported the creation and continuation of the university. The registrar, Avanish Chandra Mishra, said that they received help from Rehabilitation Council of India for course development in subjects such as Information Technology, Teacher Training Programme, Fine Art, and Music. The university has been declared eligible to receive central assistance under section 12(b) of UGC Act 1956.

Logo The logo of the university represents the four types of disability (visual, hearing, physical and mental impairment), along with the Sanskrit motto। सेवाधर्मः परमगहनः। (IAST: sevādharmaḥ paramagahanaḥ, meaning "the duty of service is extremely difficult") and the photograph of the lifelong chancellor.

== Admission ==
The university offers graduate, post-graduate and doctorate degrees in many subjects. Admissions are restricted to the four types of disabled students: visually impaired, hearing impaired, mobility impaired and mentally impaired, as defined by the Disability Act (1995) of the Government of India. The majority of students are from Uttar Pradesh, Bihar and Madhya Pradesh, followed by other states such as Assam, Maharashtra, Chhattisgarh and Uttarakhand.

Placement Center

To assist its students in selecting appropriate courses and/or programmes and getting placements based on their performances, JRHU has a placement center. The centre also arranges capsule training programmes to help youth for proper rehabilitation.

Distance Education

To reach out to students with limited mobility, the university offers distance education programs online, recognised by the Distance Education Council, IGNOU, New Delhi. Like other programs at the university, these are available only for disabled people.

Name of courses	Duration
B.C.A.	3 years
M.C.A.	2 years
B.B.A.	3 years
M.B.A.	3 years
B.A.	3 years
M.A.	2 years
P.G.D.C.A.	1 year
D.C.A.	1 year
P.G.D.B.M.	1 year

== Accessibility ==
JRHU was designed to ensure greater accessibility for disabled people to higher education. Students are provided with a disabled-friendly campus and classrooms, at an affordable cost. Courses in basic Sanskrit and computer skills are mandatory. Courses are available in Braille for visually impaired students. Hostel facility meeting special needs of disabled students is provided, including those of the visually and hearing impaired. Hostel facility is provided in the university and Tulsi Peeth, a religious and social service institution established by Rambharacharya.

All facilities of the university such as the classrooms, hostel, laboratory, and others are accessible and adapted for disabled people. An International Ramcharitmanas Research Center is in the university.

== Courses ==
The university offers many degrees. Bachelor's and master's degrees are provided in Sanskrit, Hindi, English, Sociology, Music, Drawing & Painting, History, Culture & Archaeology. Other courses include MSW (Master of Social Work), B.Mus., BFA (Bachelor in Fine Art), B.Ed., M.Ed. Special, B.Ed. (Bachelor of Education), M.Ed. (Master of Education) (Hearing Impairment & Visual Impairment), BCA (Bachelor of Computer Application), BBA (Bachelor of Business Administration), PGDIT (Post-graduate Diploma in Information Technology), DIT (Diploma in Information Technology), Diploma in Photography & Video Shooting, Diploma in Handmade Paper, Law (five-year integrated course), BPO (Bachelor in Prosthetics & Orthotics) condensed course, BPO (Bachelor in Prosthetics & Orthotics) five-year integrated course and B.A. courses in psychology.

== Notable alumni ==
- Kuldeep Joshi

== Gallery ==
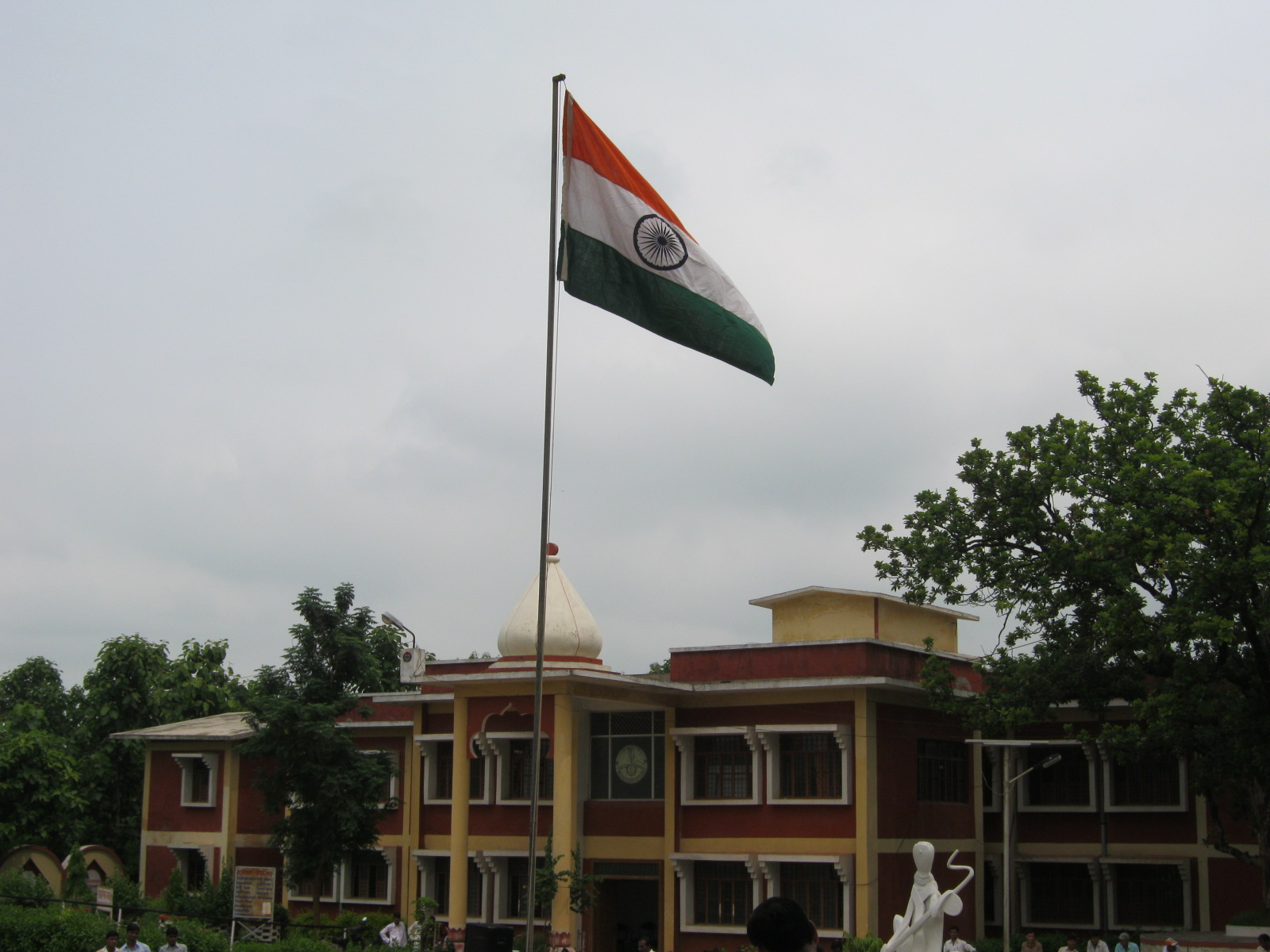
The main building of Jagadguru Rambhadracharya Divyanga University

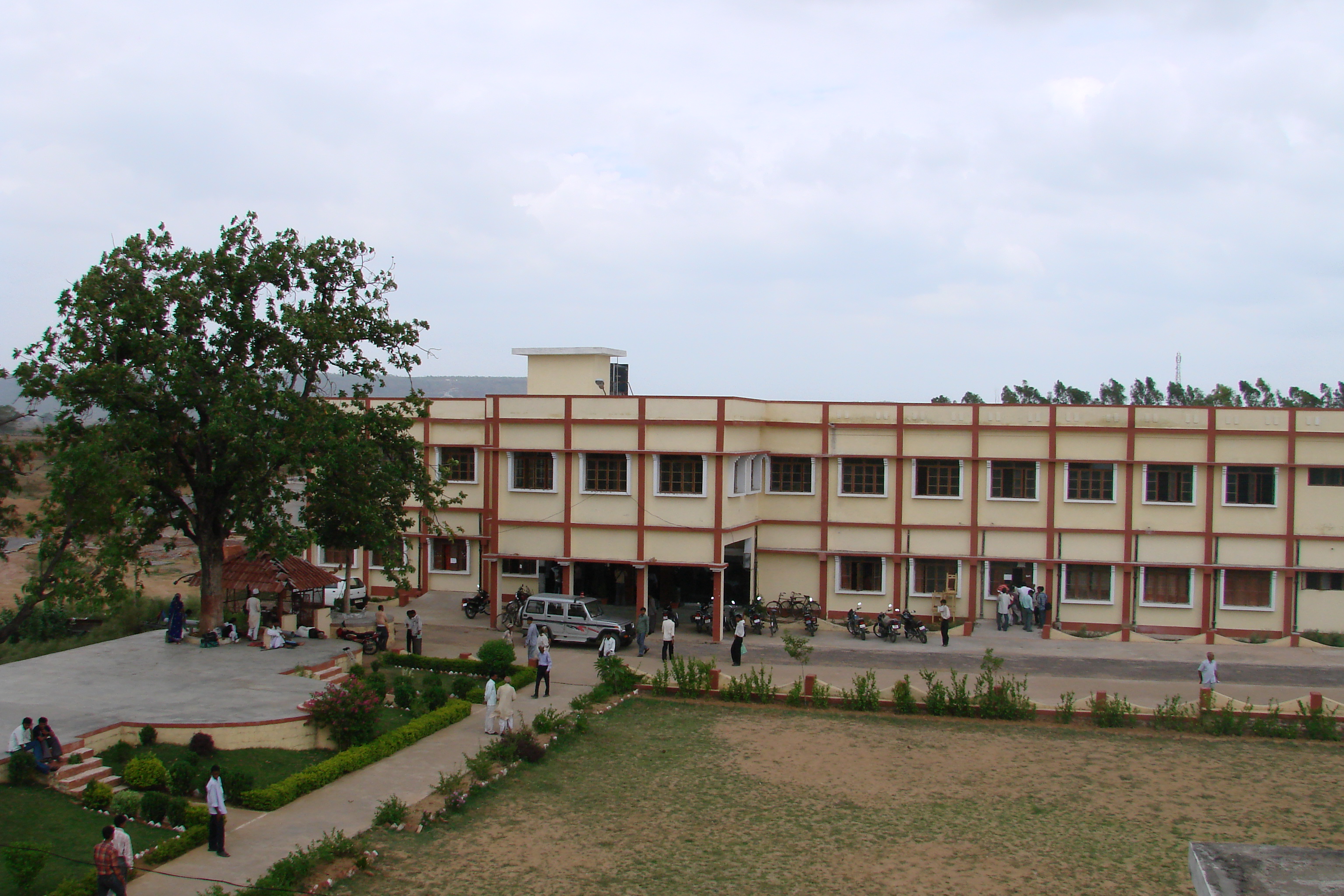
Student residence hall

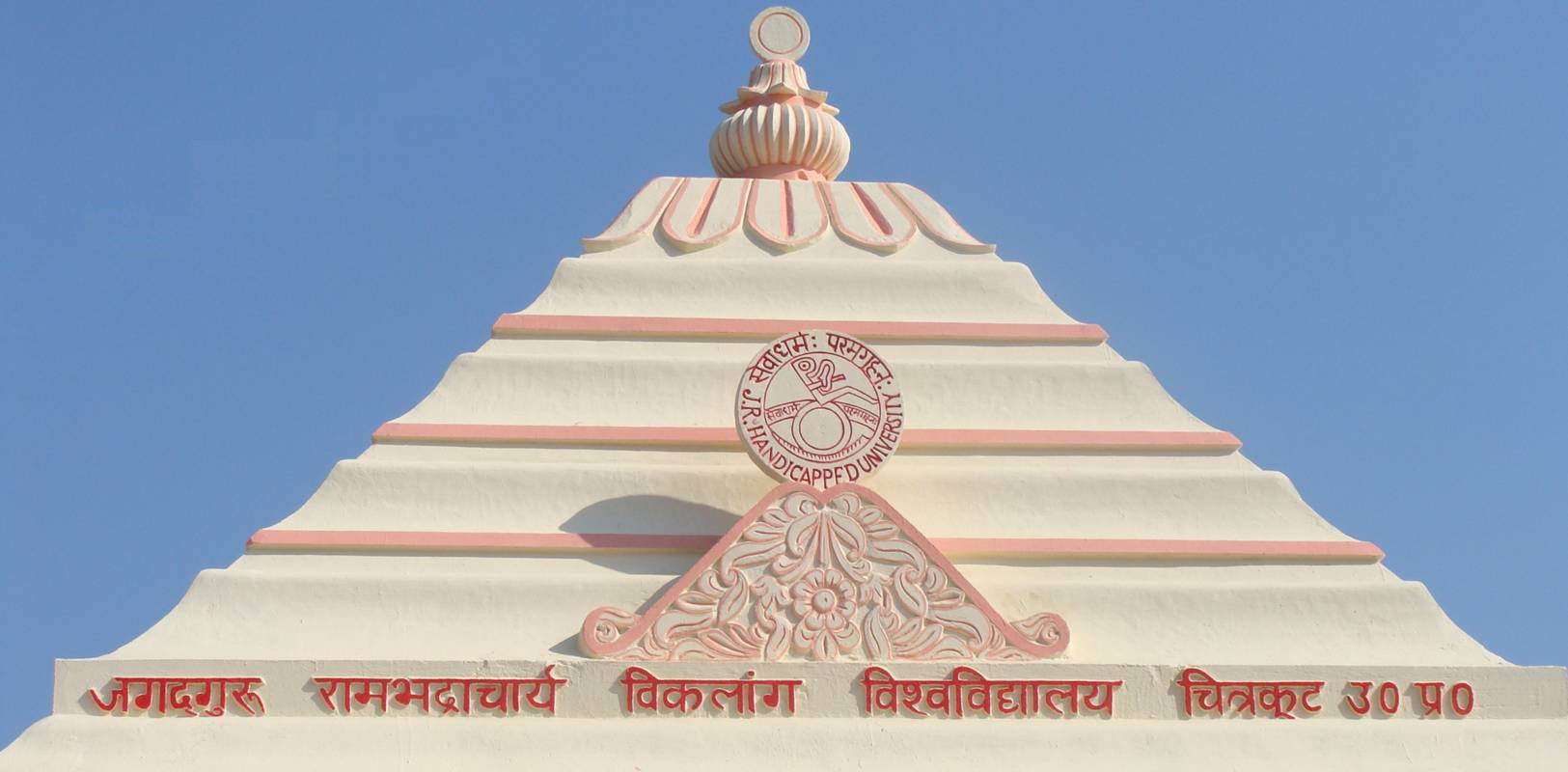
The top portion of the entrance of JRHU with the logo of the university
