= Narada Bhakti Sutra =

Sutra in Hinduism

The Narada Bhakti Sutra (IAST: Nārada Bhakti Sūtra) is a well known sutra venerated within the traditions of Hinduism, reportedly spoken by the famous sage, Narada. The text details the process of devotion (Bhakti), or Bhakti yoga and is thus of particular importance to many of the Bhakti movements within Hinduism. It has received particular attention among the Vaishnava and Vedanta traditions. Sri Ramakrishna, the mystic-saint, hails this work as, "The best path to union with God is to follow the way of divine love as taught by Narada."

Sanskrit scriptures often appear in variant editions which may show differences in organization and verse numbering. For example, in the translation by Swami Prabhavananda there are eighty-four verses arranged in nine chapters, whereas in the Bhaktivedanta Book Trust translation by A.C Bhakti Vedanta Swami Prabhupada and his disciple Satsvarupa dasa the eighty-four verses are organized into five chapters.

== Chapters ==
As organized by Swami Prabhavananda, the text covers the following subjects:

- Chapter 1 (verses 1–6) provides a definition of bhakti.
- Chapter 2 (verses 7–14) stresses the importance of renunciation and self-surrender.
- Chapter 3 (verses 15–24) provides exemplars of divine love.
- Chapter 4 (verses 25–33) endorses bhakti as the highest goal of human life.
- Chapter 5 (verses 34–42) provides suggestions on how to practice divine love.
- Chapter 6 (verses 43–50) explains the importance of seeking holy company.
- Chapter 7 (verses 51–57) discusses the difference between preparatory and supreme devotion.
- Chapter 8 (verses 58–73) covers the forms of divine love.
- Chapter 9 (verses 74–84) recommends the practice of ethical virtues and worship of God.

In the translation by Bhaktivedanta Swami Prabhupada, the chapters break at similar points, but with the first four chapters arranged into double the amount of verses:

- Chapter 1 (verses 1–14) The Value of Devotion
- Chapter 2 (verses 15–33) Defining Bhakti
- Chapter 3 (verses 34–50) The Means of Achievement
- Chapter 4 (verses 51–73) Pure and Mixed Devotion
- Chapter 5 (verses 74–84) Attaining Perfection

In the introduction of his commentary on the work, Swami Sivananda explains that the 84 sutras of the text are divided as follows: the first 24 deal with the nature of bhakti; the next nine (25 to 33) explain the superiority of bhakti over karma, jnana and Ashtanga Yoga; sutras 51 to 66 describe the laksana, or external marks, that we can see in a devotee who has genuine bhakti; and the final 18 sutras (67 to 84) extol the mahant, or great devotee, who possesses this devotion in its entirety.

== Key concepts ==
Within the text, Narada explains the perfectional stage of pure devotion; the process to achieve this state; gives quotations from other Vedic personalities on the subject matter; things to avoid when developing bhakti; and finally, explains the nature of selfless love and the different forms of attachment to the Supreme person.

=== Pure devotion ===
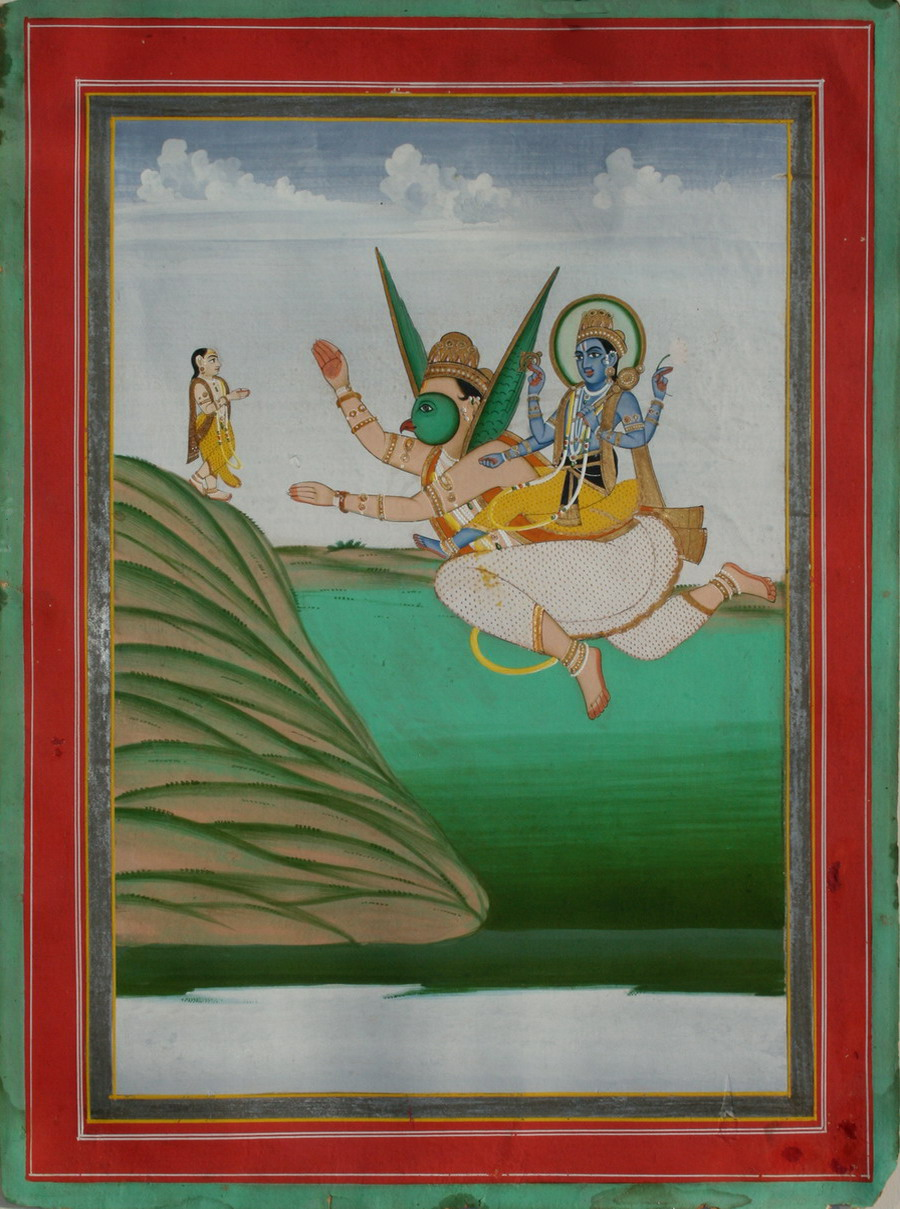
Sage Narada offering respect to Vishnu on Garuda.

Firstly, bhakti itself is defined as being "the most elevated, pure love for God" which is eternal by nature and through following which one obtains perfect peace and immortality (release from samsara). The symptoms of such devotion are that one no longer has any selfish desires, nor is affected by the dualities of loss or gain for himself being fully content with (and experiencing ecstasy through) the process of bhakti itself. Narada describes that lust is absent in those who execute bhakti purely because they naturally have no personal desires to fulfill.

The aspirant bhakta is encouraged to renounce "social customs" and "religious rituals" and to focus purely on service to God with exclusive dedication, being indifferent to whatever may stand in the way of such service. Activities of social custom and religious rituals that are favorable to devotional service are still promoted but devotional activities are given as "the only means for reaching the perfection of life."

The text then goes on to quote Vyasa, Garga and Sandilya in terms of their opinions on what is bhakti, giving the opinion that all three are correct but declaring in conclusion that "bhakti consists of offering one's every act to the Supreme Lord and feeling extreme distress in forgetting Him". The Gopis (cowherd women) of Vrindavan are given as an example of devotees who display this form of pure bhakti, but a warning is also given about 'false devotion' that imitates this perfectional stage. Narada follows this warning by stating, "Furthermore, the Lord dislikes the proud but is pleased with the humble".

=== Bhakti begets bhakti ===
An important point is made in verse 30 in regard to the relationship between bhakti and knowledge: "But the son of Brahma [Narada] says that bhakti is its own fruit". In his commentary, A. C. Bhaktivedanta Swami Prabhupada further describes in regard to this verse that "bhakti is not dependent on anything else for nourishment" being complete in itself, without dependence on the paths of either knowledge or renunciation.

=== Obtaining bhakti ===
The methods initially described for obtaining bhakti are as follows:

- Giving up worldly pleasures and the close company of others who indulge in such activities
- Worshipping the Supreme Lord ceaselessly
- Hearing and speaking about the Lord's special qualities and activities

However, following these three, the text gives the "grace of great souls" or "a small drop of the Lord's grace" as the most important factors in developing true devotion. Saying that such association is so rare and precious that it can only be obtained through the grace of God Himself, thus the instruction is given in verse 42: "Strive, strive only for the association of pure devotees".

=== Items to avoid ===
Alongside the acceptance of positive practices in the cultivation of bhakti, the text also describes items which should be avoided by the aspiring bhakta. Intimate dealings with others who are against the path of bhakti or who indulge in sinful habits is described as potentially dangerous for one attempting to purify their consciousness: "Material association is the cause of lust, anger, confusion, forgetfulness, loss of intelligence, and total calamity". It further explains that only one who abandons such material association, serves the sages and becomes selfless in their dealings, renouncing desires for profit or gain, can cross beyond the ocean of illusion. Even the Vedas are given as an object to renounce for one who wants to obtain pure and uninterrupted love for God. In later chapters, however, an instruction is also given that respect should be shown for all scriptures which promote bhakti (devotion), and an aspirant bhakta should endeavour to follow the instructions of such texts.

=== The nature of pure love ===
The text states that the true nature of the pure love of God is beyond description, but this does not restrict God from revealing it to those who are qualified. Once this pure love is obtained, it says that a person "looks only at the Lord, hears only about Him, speaks only of Him, and thinks only of Him". Secondary forms of this love are given as stepping stones which bring one to the perfectional stage, with each stage nearer to perfection being better than those preceding it. It is also stated that perfection is attained much more easily by bhakti than by any other process. The reason is that "bhakti does not depend on any other authority for its validity, being itself the standard of authority. Furthermore, bhakti is the embodiment of peace and supreme ecstasy.".

=== Ultimate attachment ===
In conclusion, the sutra gives an instruction to "patiently endure" until the perfectional stage of bhakti becomes manifest, whilst cultivating qualities such as nonviolence, honesty, cleanliness, compassion and faith. Again, it is said that the Lord "reveals Himself to His devotees" and that bhakti is the most precious of all possessions.

Next, a list of forms of attachment is given, through which a devotee should attain a loving feeling towards God, including :

- attachment to the Lord's qualities
- attachment to His beauty,
- attachment to worshiping Him,
- attachment to remembering Him,
- attachment to serving Him,
- attachment to dealing with Him as a friend,
- attachment to surrendering one's self completely to Him,
- attachment to being absorbed in thoughts of Him,

Finally, a number of devotional figures from Puranic scriptures are quoted as being agreement with the truth of the process given, including: the Four Kumaras, Vyasa, Śuka, Sandilya, Garga, Vishnu, Kaundinya, Sesha, Uddhava, Aruni, Mahabali, Hanuman, and Vibhishana.

The last verse of the text gives the message that: "Anyone who trusts these instructions spoken by Narada and is convinced by them will be blessed with devotion and attain the most dear Lord. Yes, he will attain the most dear Lord."

=== Commentators on the Narada-bhakti-sutras ===
- Acharya Rajneesh (Osho)
- Swami Prabhavananda
- A.C Bhakti Vedanta Swami Prabhupada
- Swami Sivananda
- Swami Vishwananda
- Swami Tejomayananda
- Sri Aurobindo
- Swami Tyagananda
- Sri Sri Ravi Shankar
- Swami Chinmayananda

== See also ==
- Bhakti
- Hinduism
- Narada
- Narayana

== Bibliography ==
- Bhakti Ratnavali with the Commentary of Visnu Puri Text with Translation/ Divine Books, Delhi
- Sri Narada Pancaratram - The Jnanamrita Sara Samhita/ Translated by Swami Vijnananda. Divine Books, Delhi.
- Swami Bhuteshananda. Narada Bhakti Sutras. (Advaita Ashrama: Calcutta, 1999). ISBN 81-7505-199-X. Provides Sanskrit text translated into English with a commentary by Swami Bhuteshananda, the 12th President of the Ramakrishna Math. This commentary views the work within the context of Bhakti school of Vedanta.
- Swami Chinmayananda (2005), Narada Bhakti Sutra. Central Chinmaya Mission Trust. ISBN 8175973064.
- Swami Prabhavananda. Narada's Way of Divine Love (Narada Bhakti Sutras). (Sri Ramakrishna Math: Madras). ISBN 81-7120-506-2. Provides Sanskrit text translated into English with a commentary by Swami Prabhavananda. This commentary views the work within the context of Advaita Vedanta as understood within the Ramakrishna Math.
- Swami Prabhupada. Narada-bhakti-sutra: The Secrets of Transcendental Love. (Bhaktivedanta Book Trust: 1998). ISBN 0-89213-273-6. Translation by A. C. Bhaktivedanta Swami Prabhupada and his disciple Satsvarupa dasa Goswami. Provides Sanskrit text translated into English with commentary from a Gaudiya Vaishnava perspective alongside the Sanskrit text, viewing Narada's teachings within the context of other devotional scriptures such as the Bhagavata Purana, emphasizing the role of Krishna.
- Swami Sivananda (1997). Narada Bhakti Sutras. Divine Life Society. ISBN 8170520681.
- Prem Prakash. The Yoga of Spiritual Devotion: A Modern Translation of the Narada Bhakti Sutras. (Inner Traditions International: Rochester, Vermont, 1998). ISBN 0-89281-664-3. Provides Sanskrit text translated into English with a commentary by a Westerner.
- Sri Sri Ravi Shankar. Narada Bhakti Sutra. (Art of Living). Offers interpretation of Narada Bhakti Sutra.
- Swami Tyagisananda. Aphorisms on the Gospel of Divine Love or Narada Bhakti Sutras. (Sri Ramakrishna Math: Madras). ISBN 81-7120-329-9. Provides Sanskrit text translated into English with elaborate explanatory and critical notes.
