= Dorothy Banks =

British conchologist, gardener and naturalist (1876–1937)

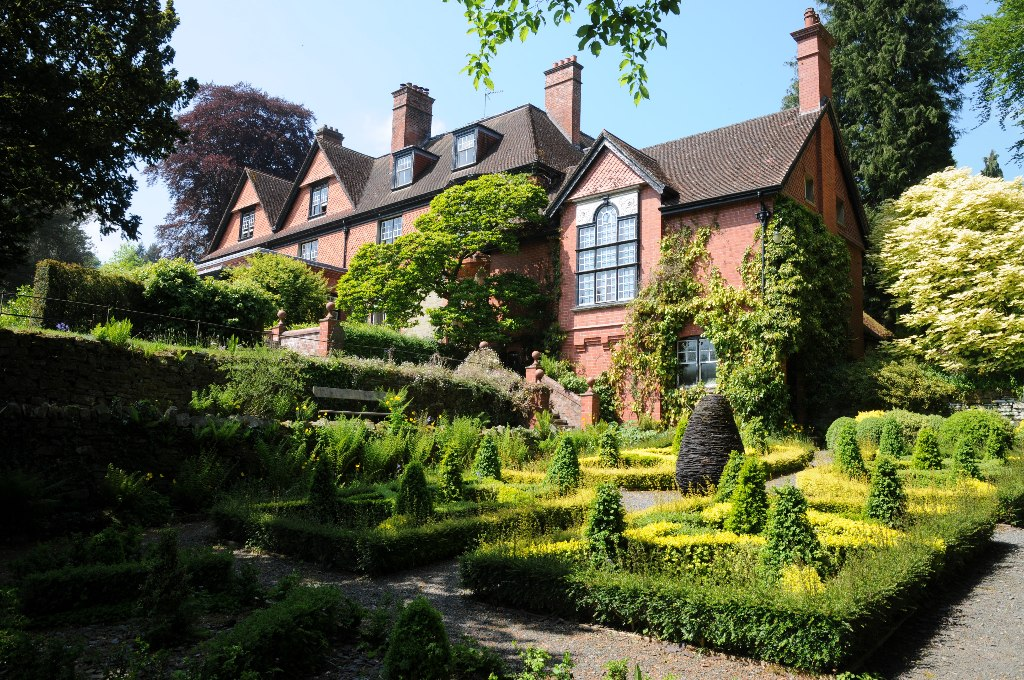
William and Dorothy Banks built Hergest Croft and its gardens in 1895

Dorothy Banks (née Alford, 1865 – 1937) was an English naturalist and shell-collector who was one of the originators of Hergest Croft Garden, Kington.

She was born in 1865 to clergyman Bradley Hurt Alford and his wife Caroline, née Lyall, and raised in London. Her older sister was the classicist Margaret Alford.

Like Margaret, Dorothy attended Girton College, Cambridge, where she gained a first in the Natural Sciences tripos in 1885–8. Her Director of Studies was conchologist Alfred Hands Cooke, and she worked and corresponded with William Bateson, John Read le Brockton Tomlin and Thomas McKenny Hughes. She received no degree, and in 1887 collected signatures for a petition for Cambridge to allow full university membership to women so that they could gain degrees.

In 1893, she married her course-mate, the banker and plant photographer William Hartland Banks. They had a son, Richard Alford (Dick) Banks (b. 1902), and three daughters.

== Hergest Croft ==
In 1895, William and Dorothy built Hergest Croft and personally designed its gardens. Dorothy’s plant knowledge and interest in the Arts and Crafts movement are detectable in the project. Management of the garden passed via their son Dick to their grandson William Lawrence Banks and his wife Elizabeth, both also horticulturalists.

== Collection ==
Dorothy was a collector of shells, minerals and fossils since the age of fifteen. Her collection, spanning from the 1870s to 1929 and comprising 900 species of British and foreign shells, is held at Hergest Croft.
