= Listed buildings in Leavenheath =

Historic structures in Suffolk, England

Leavenheath is a village and civil parish in the Babergh District of Suffolk, England. It contains 14 listed buildings that are recorded in the National Heritage List for England. Of these one is grade II* and 13 are grade II.

This list is based on the information retrieved online from Historic England.

== Key ==
Grade	Criteria
I	Buildings that are of exceptional interest
II*	Particularly important buildings of more than special interest
II	Buildings that are of special interest

== Listing ==
Name	Grade	Location	Type	Completed (Note: The date given is the date used by Historic England as significant for the initial building or that of an important part in the structure's description.)	Date designated	Grid ref. (Note: The grid reference is based on the British national grid reference system, sometimes known as OSGB36, used by the Ordnance Survey.) Geo-coordinates	Notes	Entry number (Note: The "List Entry Number" is a unique number assigned to each listed building and scheduled monument by Historic England.)	Image	Wikidata
Stonicott	II				16 June 1989	TL9500336024; 51°59′18″N 0°50′19″E		1033464	Upload Photo	Q26284946
Spring Farmhouse	II	Cock Street			9 February 1978	TL9652436116; 51°59′19″N 0°51′39″E		1351806	Upload Photo	Q26634876
Thomson's Farmhouse	II	Cock Street			20 April 1998	TL9652836319; 51°59′26″N 0°51′39″E		1119683	Upload Photo	Q26412990
Greylands	II	Harrow Street			9 February 1978	TL9580237370; 52°00′01″N 0°51′03″E		1181498	Upload Photo	Q26476816
Harrrow Street Farmhouse	II	Harrow Street			9 February 1978	TL9635937404; 52°00′01″N 0°51′33″E		1036599	Upload Photo	Q26288282
Hynards Cottage	II	Harrow Street			30 May 1986	TL9601037151; 51°59′53″N 0°51′14″E		1033461	Upload Photo	Q26284943
Green's Farmhouse	II	High Road			9 February 1978	TL9420336770; 51°59′43″N 0°49′38″E		1181511	Upload Photo	Q26476829
Honey Tye Cottage and Cottage Adjoining	II	Honey Tye			9 February 1978	TL9551435647; 51°59′06″N 0°50′45″E		1036598	Upload Photo	Q26288281
Kingsland House	II	Kingsland Lane			16 August 1988	TL9463836234; 51°59′26″N 0°50′00″E		1233395	Upload Photo	Q26526866
Acre Piece	II	Nayland Road, Honey Tye			9 February 1978	TL9557435733; 51°59′08″N 0°50′48″E		1181518	Upload Photo	Q26476836
Hare and Hounds Public House	II	Nayland Road	pub		9 February 1978	TL9542737411; 52°00′03″N 0°50′44″E		1351807	Hare and Hounds Public House More images	Q26634877
Heathcote	II	Nayland Road, Honey Tye			9 February 1978	TL9557535776; 51°59′10″N 0°50′48″E		1351808	Upload Photo	Q26634878
Honey Hall	II*	Nayland Road, Honey Tye	house		10 January 1953	TL9559535644; 51°59′05″N 0°50′49″E		1036600	Honey Hall More images	Q17532856
Rosehill Farmhouse	II	Nayland Road, Honey Tye			9 February 1978	TL9548535682; 51°59′07″N 0°50′43″E		1036601	Upload Photo	Q26288283

== See also ==
- Grade I listed buildings in Suffolk
- Grade II* listed buildings in Suffolk

== Sources ==
- Bettely, James; Pevsner, Nikolaus (2015) [1961], Suffolk: West, The Buildings of England, New Haven and London: Yale University Press, ISBN 978-0-300-19655-9
