= William Whitaker's Words =

Latin–English dictionary program

William Whitaker's Words is a computer program that parses the inflection or conjugation of a given Latin word entered by the user, and also translates the root into English. Conversely, given a basic English word, the program can output a Latin translation, generally with several possible Latin alternatives, although the database of translatable English words is not comprehensive. The software, written in Ada, is free for download but can be used online through several different hosts as well.

This program has gained popularity among Latinists because of its simple interface, high coverage of the Latin lexicon and mostly accurate results. Nevertheless, the user has to check the results, since WORDS uses a set of rules based on natural prefixation, suffixation, declension and conjugation to determine the possibility of an entry. As a consequence of this approach of analysing the structure of words, there is no guarantee that these words were ever used in Latin literature or speech, even if the program finds a possible meaning to a given word.

A few years after the original author's death, the software became the subject of digital preservation efforts.

== Coverage ==
The dictionary consists of about 39,000 entries, which would result in hundreds of thousands of variations, counting declensions and conjugations.

Additionally, the dictionary contains prefixes and suffixes.

In comparison, the Oxford Latin Dictionary, considered to be the most complete Latin lexicon published in the English language, has about 34,000 entries, excluding proper names. The Oxford Latin Dictionary has fewer entries because it only contains entries from Classical Latin, whereas WORDS contains words from many time periods.

== Parsing process ==
For instance, given the Latin verb form amābantur, WORDS analyzes it as:

amābantur = am + (ā + ba + nt + ur), where

- am = amo, amare, amavi, amatus (English to love)
- ā = theme vowel for indicative mood
- ba = marker for the imperfect
- nt = marker for third person plural number
- ur = marker for passive voice

So amābantur is the passive, 3rd person, plural, imperfect, indicative form of the verb "to love", which would be translated "they were being loved".

== About William Whitaker ==
William A. Whitaker (1936–2010) was a colonel in the United States Air Force. While at the Defense Advanced Research Projects Agency (DARPA), he chaired the High Order Language Working Group that recommended development of the computer language Ada, in which WORDS is written. An accomplished Latinist, he created the translation software called WORDS after his retirement from the forces.

== See also ==
- A Latin Dictionary
