= Lithuanian declension =

Declensions in the Lithuanian language

Lithuanian has a declension system which is similar to declension systems in ancient Indo-European languages such as Sanskrit, Latin and Ancient Greek. Although scholars have traditionally enumerated up to ten case forms in Lithuanian, at least one case is used only by adverbs and some fixed expressions; another is extinct in the modern language. Lithuanian officially has seven cases, and the illative case (also used in Finnish, Latvian, Estonian, Hungarian, Sámi and Vepsian) can be replaced with the locative case. The cases are:

- nominative (vardininkas), used to identify inflection type
- genitive (kilmininkas), used to identify inflection type
- dative (naudininkas)
- accusative (galininkas)
- instrumental (įnagininkas)
- locative (inessive vietininkas), with three subcases:
  - illative (kryptininkas)
  - allative (pašalys), used by adverbs and in some fixed expressions
  - adessive (gretininkas)
- vocative (šauksmininkas)

Lithuanian has two main grammatical numbers: singular and plural. A dual number is also used in certain dialects, such as Samogitian. Some words in standard Lithuanian retain their dual forms, such as du ("two") and abu ("both"), an indefinite number, and super-plural words (Lithuanian: dauginiai žodžiai). Dual forms of pronouns used in standard Lituanian are optional. Although the dual number can be grammatically applied to any word, in practice its use is declining. Singular and plural are used similarly to many European languages. Singular, plural and dual inflections of the same case always differ among themselves; no rule dictates how to form the plural inflection from the singular of the same case.

== Nouns ==
Lithuanian nouns have five declensions, which are defined by the inflection in singular nominative and genitive cases. Only a few borrowed words, such as taksi̇̀ (taxi), tabù (taboo) and kupė̃ (train compartment or coupe), are not subject to declension.

Declension	Inflection in singular cases		Examples			Notes
Declension	Nominative	Genitive	Nominative	Genitive	Meaning	Notes
I	-as, -is, -ys, -ias	-o	výras; mẽdis; traukinỹs; svẽčias	výro; mẽdžio; tráukinio; svẽčio	man; husband; tree; train; guest	Main pattern for masculine nouns
II	-a, -i (Note: Only two nouns ending in -i: pati̇̀ (wife) and marti̇̀ (daughter-in-law). Their declension is the same as the second adjective feminine declension and similar to a second feminine noun palatalized declension. The noun pati̇̀ is homonymous with the pronoun pati̇̀ (herself; myself f; itself for feminine nouns).), -ė	-os, -ės	žmonà; šviesà; várna; pradžià; sáulė	žmonõs; šviesõs; várnos; pradžiõs; sáulės	wife; light; crow; beginning; sun	Main pattern for feminine nouns; few masculine exceptions
III	-is (Note: Exception: petỹs m (shoulder), peties, etc. after this declensional pattern. This declension is similar to the fifth declension.)	-ies	móteris (Note: Duktė (daughter) is the only fifth-declension word without the ending -uo. The word móteris (woman, female) often has a genitive móters; the plural genitive of móteris is móterų (not palatalized -ių); it is the only normal form for the fifth declension, and one of two (the main is -ių) for the third. The other two words, obeli̇̀s f (apple tree) and dieveri̇̀s m – (older brother-in-law), are the same declensional case as móteris. Dieveri̇̀s, being masculine, may have a singular instrumental -iu; dieveri̇̀s is also the only -er- masculine case. The word bróteris (brother; modern brólis) may have existed in Old Lithuanian.); pili̇̀s; avi̇̀s; danti̇̀s	móteries; piliẽs; aviẽs; dantiẽs	woman; castle; sheep; tooth	Rarer; feminine nouns, fewer masculine exceptions
IV	-us	-aus	žmogùs; sūnùs; medùs; skai̇̃čius	žmogaũs; sūnaũs; medaũs; skai̇̃čiaus	human; son; honey; number; digit	Rare; masculine nouns
V	-uo, -ė	-en-s, -er-s	vanduõ; akmuõ; skaitmuõ; sesuõ; duktė̃	vandeñs; akmeñs; skaitmeñs; seser̃s; dukter̃s	water; stone; digit; sister; daughter	Very rare; masculine nouns, four feminine; suffixed by -en- m and -er- f

Noun and adjective declension suffixes
Case	First declension					Second declension			Third declension		Fourth declension		Fifth declension		Adjectives	
Case	Masculine					Feminine			Feminine	Masculine	Masculine		Masculine	Feminine	Masculine	Feminine
Case	-ǎ-		-i-			-o-		-ė-	-i-		-u-		-i-		-ǎ-	-o-
Singular
Nominative	-as		-is	-ys	-ias	-a	-ia	-ė	-is		-us	-ius	-uo		-as	-a
Genitive	-o		-io			-os	-ios	-ės	-ies		-aus	-iaus	-en-s	-er-s	-o	-os
Dative	-ui		-iui			-ai	-iai	-ei	-iai	-iui	-ui	-iui	-en-iui	-er-iai	-am	-ai
Accusative	-ą		-į		-ią	-ą	-ią	-ę	-į		-ų	-ių	-en-į	-er-į	-ą	
Instrumental	-u		-iu			-a	-ia	-e	-imi		-umi	-iumi	-en-iu	-er-imi	-u	-a
Locative	-e		-yje			-oje	-ioje	-ėje	-yje		-uje	-iuje	-en-yje	-er-yje	-ame	-oje
Vocative	-e (Note: Nouns having -j- before an ending -as, such as vėjas (wind), vertėjas (translator), naudotojas (user, from naudoti, to use), and vartotojas (consumer, from vartoti, to consume) have vocative -au: vėjau, vertėjau, naudotojau, vartotojau. Feminine counterparts are vertėja, naudotoja, vartotoja, and their vocative is the same as the nominative. If naudotojas had the vocative ending -e, it would sound like the feminine.)	-ai	-i	-y	-y (Note: A few words have the singular nominative ending -ias. Historically, they are related to -ys words; -ias words have -y in vocative: svečias – svety (guest); kelias – kely (road). Some have a fifth-declension-like ending -iau in vocative: velnias – velniau (devil). In dialects, an inflection -iau in vocative can be used for names ending in -is: Algis – Algiau (dial.) instead of Algi.)	-a	-ia	-e	-ie		-au	-iau	-en-ie	-er-ie	-as	-a
Plural
Nominative	-ai		-iai			-os	-ios	-ės	-ys		-ūs	-iai	-en-ys	-er-ys	-i	-os
Genitive	-ų		-ių			-ų	-ių	-ių	-ių (Note: Many nouns of this type have -ų in genitive plural: žąsis f – žąsų (goose), naktis f – naktų (night), debesis m – debesų (cloud).)		-ų	-ių	-en-ų	-er-ų	-ų	-ų
Dative	-ams		-iams			-oms	-ioms	-ėms	-ims		-ums	-iams	-en-ims	-er-ims	-iems	-oms
Accusative	-us		-ius			-as	-ias	-es	-is		-us	-ius	-en-is	-er-is	-us	-as
Instrumental	-ais		-iais			-omis	-iomis	-ėmis	-imis		-umis	-iais	-en-imis	-er-imis	-ais	-omis
Locative	-uose		-iuose			-ose	-iose	-ėse	-yse		-uose	-iuose	-en-yse	-er-yse	-uose	-ose
Vocative	-ai		-iai			-os	-ios	-ės	-ys		-ūs	-iai	-en-ys	-er-ys	-i	-os

Each Lithuanian consonant (except [j]) has two forms: palatalized and non-palatalized ([bʲ]-[b], [dʲ]-[d], [ɡʲ]-[ɡ]). The consonants preceding vowels [i] and [e] are moderately palatalized.

The letter i represents the sound similar to short i in the English "lit" or is a palatalization marker, softening the preceding consonant (ia = like e, iu = ü, io = ö; all samples where i is a softening marker are ia (ią), iu (iū, ių), io). But ie is a diphthong, and there are no ię and iė combinations. Other diphthongs are uo, ai, ei, oi (used only in foreign words).

Feminine nouns ending in -a and masculine nouns ending in -us have the palatal forms -ia and -ius. The nominative singular ending -ias is a palatal variant of -as. Two consonants (d and t) become dž [dʒ] and č [tʃ], respectively, when they precede the palatalization marker i.

=== First declension ===
-as, -is, -ys (masculine)
Case	vai̇̃kas (child)		brólis (brother)		arklỹs (horse)	
Case	Singular	Plural	Singular	Plural	Singular	Plural
Nominative	vaikas	vaikai	brolis	broliai	arklys	arkliai
Genitive	vaiko	vaikų	brolio	brolių	arklio	arklių
Dative	vaikui	vaikams	broliui	broliams	arkliui	arkliams
Accusative	vaiką	vaikus	brolį	brolius	arklį	arklius
Instrumental	vaiku	vaikais	broliu	broliais	arkliu	arkliais
Locative	vaike	vaikuose	brolyje	broliuose	arklyje	arkliuose
Vocative	vaike	vaikai	broli	broliai	arkly	arkliai

Note that the -e ending for the vocative singular applies only to common nouns; proper nouns take the ending -ai – for example, Jonas (John, nominative) and Jonai! (John! [vocative]).

=== Second declension ===
-a, -ė, -ti (feminine)
Case	mótina (mother)		katė̃ (cat)		pati̇̀ (wife)	
Case	Singular	Plural	Singular	Plural	Singular	Plural
Nominative	motina	motinos	katė	katės	pati	pačios
Genitive	motinos	motinų	katės	kačių	pačios	pačių
Dative	motinai	motinoms	katei	katėms	pačiai	pačioms
Accusative	motiną	motinas	katę	kates	pačią	pačias
Instrumental	motina	motinomis	kate	katėmis	pačia	pačiomis
Locative	motinoje	motinose	katėje	katėse	pačioje	pačiose
Vocative	motina	motinos	kate	katės	pati (or pačia)	pačios

Only two nouns end in -i: pati 'wife' and marti̇̀ 'daughter-in-law'. Their declension is the same as the second adjective feminine declension. The noun pati has the same form as the pronoun pati 'herself; myself (feminine); itself (for feminine nouns)'.

=== Third declension ===
-is (masculine and feminine)
Case	vagi̇̀s (thief, masculine)		aki̇̀s (eye, feminine)	
Case	Singular	Plural	Singular	Plural
Nominative	vagis	vagys	akis	akys
Genitive	vagies	vagių	akies	akių
Dative	vagiui	vagims	akiai	akims
Accusative	vagį	vagis	akį	akis
Instrumental	vagimi	vagimis	akimi	akimis
Locative	vagyje	vagyse	akyje	akyse
Vocative	vagie	vagys	akie	akys

The only difference in masculine and feminine nouns of this declension is between the dative singular forms.

=== Fourth declension ===
-us, -ius (masculine)
Case	sūnùs (son)		profèsorius (professor)	
Case	Singular	Plural	Singular	Plural
Nominative	sūnus	sūnūs	profesorius	profesoriai
Genitive	sūnaus	sūnų	profesoriaus	profesorių
Dative	sūnui	sūnums	profesoriui	profesoriams
Accusative	sūnų	sūnus	profesorių	profesorius
Instrumental	sūnumi	sūnumis	profesoriumi	profesoriais
Locative	sūnuje	sūnuose	profesoriuje	profesoriuose
Vocative	sūnau	sūnūs	profesoriau	profesoriai

The palatalized variant of this declension has the forms of the first declension.

=== Fifth declension ===
-uo (masculine)
Case	vanduõ (water)		sesuõ (sister)		duktė̃ (daughter)	
Case	Singular	Plural	Singular	Plural	Singular	Plural
Nominative	vanduo	vandenys	sesuo	seserys	duktė	dukterys
Genitive	vandens	vandenų	sesers	seserų	dukters	dukterų
Dative	vandeniui	vandenims	seseriai	seserims	dukteriai	dukterims
Accusative	vandenį	vandenis	seserį	seseris	dukterį	dukteris
Instrumental	vandeniu	vandenimis	seseria	seserimis	dukteria	dukterimis
Locative	vandenyje	vandenyse	seseryje	seseryse	dukteryje	dukteryse
Vocative	vandenie	vandenys	seserie	seserys	dukterie	dukterys

There are also two feminine fifth-declension nouns: sesuo (sister) and duktė (daughter).

== Adjectives ==
Adjectives have three declensions, determined by the singular and plural nominative-case inflections. Adjectives agree with nouns in number, gender, and case. Unlike nouns (which have two genders, masculine and feminine), adjectives have three (except -is, -ė adjectives); the neuter adjectives (the third example in the table) have only one uninflected form.

Declension	Singular nominative		Plural nominative		Examples
Declension	Masculine	Feminine	Masculine	Feminine	Examples
I	-(i)as	-(i)a	-i	-(i)os	šáltas, šaltà, šálta – cold; šlápias, šlapià, šlápia – wet, soppy
II	-us	-i	-ūs	-ios	gražùs, graži̇̀, gražù – pretty, beautiful; malonùs, maloni̇̀, malonù – pleasant
III	-is	-ė	-iai	-ės	vari̇̀nis, vari̇̀nė – copper; lauki̇̀nis, lauki̇̀nė – wild;
III	-is	-ė	-i	-ės	di̇̀delis, di̇̀delė – big; dešinỹs, dešinė̃ – right; kairỹs, kairė̃ – left.

Most of the first-type adjectives of the third declension are with the suffix -in-. These are easily made from nouns by adding the suffix -in-. From verbs, they are mostly made from a past passive participle: vi̇̀rti 'to boil', vi̇̀rtas 'boiled', virti̇̀nis 'made by boiling'. The suffix is -t-in- for such adjectives. These variants of verbal derivation easily become nouns; in this case, it is a noun virti̇̀nis 'dumpling (with a non-meat ingredient)'; dumplings with meat are koldūnai). Some other word types have certain suffixes or prefixes in this declensional group: pern-ykšt-is 'of yesteryear', (pernai 'in yesteryear'; prie-kurtis 'somewhat deaf'; (ketvirt-ain-is, viln-on-is 'woollen', graž-ut-ėl-is, rug-ien-is, maž-yl-is 'tiny tot'.

Two adjectives of the third declension have long -ys: dešinỹs 'right', kairỹs 'left'. Plural nominative is dešini̇̀, kairi̇̀; plural dative is dešini̇́ems, kairi̇́ems. A short form of di̇̀delis, di̇̀delė is di̇̀dis, didi̇̀ (similar to pats, pati). Dešinys, kairys, didis have neutral gender with the u pattern: dešinu, kairu, didu. Pronominal forms are didỹsis, didžióji, dešinỹsis, dešinióji. Didis has mingled forms; nominative is sometimes didus; genitive masculine didžio or didaus; accusative didį (or didų); plural masculine nominative didūs. Other forms follow the regular pattern. Adjectives, except the -inis type and the adjective didelis, can have pronominal (definite) forms. Some other forms have variations: pė́sčias, pėsčià, pė́sčia 'pedestrian, afoot'; pėsčiàsis, pėsčióji and pėstỹsis, pėsčióji (adjective and noun meanings).

Adjective declension endings
Case	Masculine					Feminine			
Case	I		II	III		I		II	III
Case	-ǎ-		-u-	-i-		-ā-		-i-	-ē-
Singular
Nominative	-as	-ias	-us	-is		-a	-ia	-i	-ė
Genitive	-o	-io	-aus	-io		-os	-ios		-ės
Dative	-am	-iam				-ai	-iai		-ei
Accusative	-ą	-ią	-ų	-į		-ą	-ią		-ę
Instrumental	-u	-iu				-a	-ia		-e
Locative	-ame	-iame				-oje	-ioje		-ėje
Plural
Nominative	-i		-ūs	-iai	-i	-os	-ios		-ės
Genitive	-ų	-ių				-ų	-ių		
Dative	-iems			-iams	-iems	-oms	-ioms		-ėms
Accusative	-us	-ius				-as	-ias		-es
Instrumental	-ais	-iais				-omis	-iomis		-ėmis
Locative	-uose	-iuose				-ose	-iose		-ėse

Masculine adjectives of the third declension have two types, differing in plural nominative and dative. Varinis 'copper, brazen' and laukinis 'wild' have the plural nominatives variniai, laukiniai and plural datives variniams, laukiniams. An example of the second type is didelis 'big': dideli in plural nominative and dideliems in plural dative.

Definite forms
Case	Masculine				Feminine		
Case	I		II	III	I	II	III
Case	-ǎ-		-u-	-i-	-ā-	-i-	-ē-
Singular
Nominative	-as-is	-ias-is	-us-is	-ys-is	-o-ji	-io-ji	
Genitive	-o-jo	-io-jo			-os-ios	-ios-ios	
Dative	-a-jam	-ia-jam			-a-jai	-ia-jai	
Accusative	-ą-jį	-ią-jį	-ų-jį	-į-jį	-ą-ją	-ią-ją	
Instrumental	-uo-ju	-iuo-ju			-ą-ją	-ią-ją	
Locative	-a-jame	-ia-jame			-o-joje	-io-joje	
Plural
Nominative	-ie-ji				-os-ios	-ios-sios	
Genitive	-ų-jų	-ių-jų			-ų-jų	-ių-jų	
Dative	-ies-iems				-os-ioms	-ios-ioms	
Accusative	-uos-ius	-iuos-ius			-as-ias	-ias-ias	
Instrumental	-ais-iais	-iais-iais			-os-iomis	-ios-iomis	
Locative	-uos-iuose	-iuos-iuose			-os-iose	-ios-iose	

The definite form of an adjective is formed by merging adjectives with third-person personal pronouns: mažas 'small' + jis (is) 'he' = mažasis, maža + ji 'she' = mažoji. An example is mažasis princas 'the little prince'; the title of the novella is Mažasis princas (The Little Prince). The indefinite form is mažas princas 'a little prince'.

Several forms have a pronoun added and an indefinite-adjective ending syllable; the longer sound is retained: feminine singular nominative -o-ji, masculine singular instrumental and plural accusative, respectively -uo-ju, -uos-ius (the respective forms of a pronoun jis are juo, juos) and one with ogonek, feminine singular instrumental: -ą-ja, -ią-ja; or has a sound -m- not doubled: masculine singular dative and locative, masculine plural dative, feminine plural dative and instrumental; an example is -a-jam, -a-jame, -ies-iems.

Examples
Case	geras (good)				gražus (beautiful)				vidutinis (middle)			
Case	Masculine		Feminine		Masculine		Feminine		Masculine		Feminine	
Case	Singular	Plural	Singular	Plural	Singular	Plural	Singular	Plural	Singular	Plural	Singular	Plural
Nominative	geras	geri	gera	geros	gražus	gražūs	graži	gražios	vidutinis	vidutiniai	vidutinė	vidutinės
Genitive	gero	gerų	geros	gerų	gražaus	gražių	gražios	gražių	vidutinio	vidutinių	vidutinės	vidutinių
Dative	geram	geriems	gerai	geroms	gražiam	gražiems	gražiai	gražioms	vidutiniam	vidutiniams	vidutinei	vidutinėms
Accusative	gerą	gerus	gerą	geras	gražų	gražius	gražią	gražias	vidutinį	vidutinius	vidutinę	vidutines
Instrumental	geru	gerais	gera	geromis	gražiu	gražiais	gražia	gražiomis	vidutiniu	vidutiniais	vidutine	vidutinėmis
Locative	gerame	geruose	geroje	gerose	gražiame	gražiuose	gražioje	gražiose	vidutiniame	vidutiniuose	vidutinėje	vidutinėse

== Pronouns ==
The personal pronouns aš (I), tu (you) jis (he, it), ji (she, it) and the reflexive pronoun savęs are declined as follows:

			Nominative	Accusative	Genitive	Dative	Instrumental	Locative
Singular	1st person		aš	mane	manęs	man	manimi	manyje
Singular	2nd person		tu	tave	tavęs	tau	tavimi	tavyje
Singular	3rd person	Masculine	jis	jį	jo	jam	juo	jame
Singular	3rd person	Feminine	ji	ją	jos	jai	ja	joje
Reflexive			–	save	savęs	sau	savimi	savyje
Dual	1st person	Masculine	mudu		mudviejų	mudviem		mudviese
Dual	1st person	Feminine	mudvi		mudviejų	mudviem		mudviese
Dual	2nd person	Masculine	judu		judviejų	judviem		judviese
Dual	2nd person	Feminine	judvi		judviejų	judviem		judviese
Dual	3rd person	Masculine	juodu or jiedu	juodu	judviejų	jiedviem		juodviese
Dual	3rd person	Feminine	jiedvi		judviejų	jodviem		jiedviese
Plural	1st person		mes	mus	mūsų	mums	mumis	mumyse
Plural	2nd person		jūs	jus	jūsų	jums	jumis	jumyse
Plural	3rd person	Masculine	jie	juos	jų	jiems	jais	juose
Plural	3rd person	Feminine	jos	jas	jų	joms	jomis	jose

The table contains only the objective genitive of the pronouns aš, tu, savęs; the possessive genitives of these words are mano, tavo and savo, respectively. Compare jis manęs laukia 'he waits for me' and mano draugas 'my friend' ("friend" is masculine); in jis mūsų laukia 'he waits for us' and mūsų draugas 'our friend', the two genitives coincide as usual.

== Irregular declension ==
Duktė 'daughter' and sesuo 'sister' are the only two feminine fifth-declension words; they have the suffix -er- in the other cases. One word, moteris 'woman, female', is of the fifth and third declensions because it has a variant genitive singular. Both variants (-s and -ies) are equally apt, and it has a genitive plural -ų. Two more words, dieveris m '(older) brother-in-law' and obelis f 'apple tree', are the same case as moteris. The suffix -imi is normal for masculine fifth-declension nouns, such as akmenimi/akmeniu.

The word šuo 'dog' differs from the other -uo words; its stem is mixed with the suffix -uo, and it does not have the suffix -en- in the other cases (š-uo, akm-uo; šu-n-į, akm-en-į), its normal singular instrumental ending, is of the third type (šunimi. Mėnuo 'month, moon' is of the first declension -is type. The only fifth-type form is one of the two variants of singular nominative: mėnuo (the other is mėnesis). The word žmogus 'man (human)' historically had the nominative singular žmuo. Today žmogus is declined in the fourth paradigm in singular (žmogus, žmogaus), and in the third -ė paradigm in plural (žmonės, žmonių).

The words pats m, pati f 'one/my/him/her/itself' (also a noun 'husband and wife') are irregular. The ending -i (feminine singular nominative) is present in only two words: pati and marti 'daughter-in-law'. Pats (< patis) is of the third adjectival declensional type, but the singular nominative is different (-s < -is).

The third-declension words (-is, -ies) have -ių or -ų in genitive plural. The dative singular, similar to the fifth declensional type, differs by gender (-iai f, -iui m). The instrumental singular, different from the fifth type, is the same for both genders. One third-type noun, petys, peties, has a singular nominative ending with a long i: -ys. Some words with the suffix -uonis have parallel forms in the other declensions: palikuonis, -ies (common gender) and palikuonis, -io m, palikuonė, -ės f.

=== Shifts in declension ===
Some shifts are common; pats in singular genitive (paties) is often pronounced pačio, and the two forms are equal. Some words have parallel forms from other declensions with a slight change in meaning: dukra, dukros; sesė, sesės; palikuonis, -io, palikuonė, -ės. The forms sesė and dukra are more informal than duktė, -ers and sesuo, -ers.

First- and third-declension forms sometimes occur in speech for masculine fifth-declension words. Similarly, masculine third-declension words are sometimes declined in the first declension because the nominative singular is the same. The word akmuo, akmens can have the third-declension singular nominative and genitive forms akmenis, akmenies. Petys is the only -ys (instead of -is) form declined in the third declension.

For the word mėnuo/mėnesis, the proper form is singular genitive mėnesio. The genitive of pats is paties (frequently pačio). Some nouns occur in another declensional type in only one case. Seseris may be pronounced seseria in dialects, but the genitive remains sesers. The dialectal and older form sesuva (a type of sesuo), for example, can remain in the original paradigm with singular genitive sesers or shift to the -a declension: sesuva, sesuvos.

=== Tables ===
In the tables below, words from the fifth and the third declensions are compared with words from the other declensions. Table cells with the correct forms written are coloured (not white). Variant fifth- and third-declension forms are in the right column. The first column contains fifth-declension words (-uo, -ens/-ers), and the second has third-declension words (-is, -ies). These declensions are similar. Words are in the same column when the forms are same. The column to the right of these contains first- and second-declension forms (-as, -is, -ys, -ias) and second (-a (-ia), -ė); one word, žmogus, is fourth declension in singular.

For -uo words (except mėnuo) and -is words (such as dantis), a shift to other declensions would be incorrect. When the shift is from fifth to third declension, it is a minor variation.

Nominative
III and V declensions		I, II, IV declensions	other forms of words of III and V
	obeli̇̀s f 3a		
	móteris 1	móterà 1, 3a	
duktė̃ 3b	dukteri̇̀s 3b	dukrà 4 (2)	
sesuõ 3b	seseri̇̀s 3b (1)	seserià 3b, sẽsė 2 (4)	sesuõj, sesuõn, sesuvà
	dieveri̇̀s 3a, 1	di̇́everis, dieverỹs 3a	
mė́nuo 1 (3a)	mė́nesis 1	mė́nesis 1, mėnesỹs 3a	mė́nuoj
		judesỹs 3b	
žmuo		žmogùs 4	žmuõj
vanduõ 3a	vandeni̇̀s	vandenỹs, vándenis	vanduõj, vanduõn, vanduvà, vandvà
akmuõ 3b	akmeni̇̀s	akmenỹs, ãkmenis, ãkmenas	akmuõj, ãkmuo, akmuvà
šuõ 4	šuni̇̀s	šùnis	šuõj, šuõn, šuvà
	danti̇̀s m 4	dañtis	
	pàts m 4		patis
		pati̇̀ f 4, pačià	
	palikuoni̇̀s 34b	palikuõnis m, ė f 2	
	rūgšti̇̀s f 3 (1)	rū̃gštis 2; rū́gštė 1 (3)	

Genitive
III-V declensions		I, II, IV declensions	other forms
obel̃s	obeliẽs		obelès
móters	móteries		moterès
dukter̃s	dukteriẽs	dukrõs	
seser̃s	seseriẽs	sẽsės	seserès, -erė̃s
diever̃s	dieveriẽs	di̇́everio	
mėnaũs	mė́nesies	mė́nesio	
		jùdesio	
		žmogaũs	
vandeñs	vandeniẽs, *vandiniẽs	vándenio, -inio,* vándnio	vandenès
akmeñs	akmeniẽs,	ãkmenio, ãkmeno	akmenès
šuñs	šuniẽs	šùnio	šunès
	dantiẽs	dañčio	
	patiẽs	pãčio	
		pačiõs	
	palikuoniẽs	palikuõnio, ės	
	rūgštiẽs	rū̃gščio; rū́gštės	

Dative
III-V d.	I, II, IV d.	other
óbeliai		
móteriai	moterai	
dùkteriai	dùkrai	
sẽseriai	sẽsei	sẽser, -i, -ie (-iẽ)
di̇́everiui	di̇́everiui	
mė́nesiui	mė́nesiui	
	jùdesiui	
	žmõgui	
vándeniui*		
ãkmeniui	ãkmenui	
šùniui	šùniui	šùni
dañčiui	dañčiui	
pačiám	pãčiui	
	pãčiai / pačiái	
pãlikuoniui	palikuõniui, ei	
rū́gščiai	rū̃gščiui; rū́gštei	

Accusative
III-V d.	I, II, IV d.
óbelį	
móterį	
dùkterį	dùkrą
sẽserį	sẽsę
di̇́everį	di̇́everį
mė́nesį	mė́nesį
	jùdesį
žmunį	žmõgų
vándenį	
ãkmenį	akmeną
šùnį	
dañtį	
pãtį	
	pãčią
pãlikuonį	palikuõnį, ę
rū́gštį	rū̃gštį; rū́gštę

Instrumental
III-V d.	I, II, IV d.	
obelimi̇̀	óbelia	
móterimi	móteria	mótera
dukterimi̇̀	dùkteria	dukrà
seserimi̇̀	sẽseria	sesè
dieverimi̇̀	di̇́everiu	di̇́everiu
mė́nesimi	mė́nesiu	mė́nesiu
		jùdesiu
		žmogumi̇̀
vandenimi̇̀	vándeniu	vándeniu
akmenimi̇̀	ãkmeniu	ãkmenu
šunimi̇̀		šuniù
dantimi̇̀		dančiù
	pačiù	pačiù
	pačià	
palikuonimi̇̀		palikuõniu, e
rūgštimi̇̀	rū́gščia	rūgščiù; rū́gšte

Locative
III-V d.	I, II, IV d.
obelyjè	
móteryje	
dukteryjè	dukrojè
seseryjè	sẽsėje
dieveryjè	di̇́everyje
	mė́nesyje
	judesyjè
	žmogujè
vandenyjè	
akmenyjè	
šunyjè	
dantyjè	
	pačiamè
	pačiojè
palikuonyjè	palikuõnyje, ėje
rūgštyjè	rū̃gštyje; rū́gštėje

Vocative
III-V d.	I, II, IV d.
obeliẽ	
móterie	
dukteriẽ	dùkra
seseriẽ	sẽse
dieveriẽ	di̇́everi
mė́nesie	mė́nesi, -iẽ
	judesỹ
	žmogaũ
vandeniẽ	vándeni, -ỹ
akmeniẽ	akmenỹ, -i, ãkmenai
šuniẽ	šùniau, šùni
dantiẽ	dañčiau, dañti
patiẽ	
	pãčia, pati̇̀
palikuoniẽ	palikuõni, e
rūgštiẽ	rū̃gšti; rū́gšte

Nominative
III-V d.	I-II d.	
óbelys		
móterys		
dùkterys	dùkros	
sẽserys	sẽsės	sẽsers, -eres, -erės
di̇́everys	di̇́everiai	
mė́nesys	mė́nesiai	
	judesiai̇̃	
žmónys	žmónės	žmónes, žmónies
vándenys	vandeniai̇̃, -enai̇̃*vandiniai̇̃, -inai̇̃	vándens, -enes, -enės
ãkmenys	akmeniai̇̃, akmenai̇̃	ãkmenes, -ens, -enie
šùnys	šuniai	šùnes, šùnės
dañtys	dañčiai	
pãtys		
	pãčios	
pãlikuonys	palikuõniai, ės	
rū́gštys	rū̃gščiai; rū́gštės	

Genitive
III-V d.		I-II d.
obelų̃	obelių̃	
móterų		
dukterų̃		dukrų̃
seserų̃	seserių̃	sẽsių
dieverų̃	dieverių̃	di̇́everių
	mė́nesių	mė́nesių
		judesių̃
		žmonių̃
vandenų̃*	vandenių̃	vándenų, -ų̃
akmenų̃	akmenių̃	akmenių̃
šunų̃	šunių̃	šunių̃
dantų̃		
	pačių̃	
		pačių̃
	palikuonių̃	palikuõnių
	rūgščių̃	rū̃gščių; rū́gščių

Dative
III-V d.	I-II d.
obeli̇̀ms	
móterims	móteroms
dukteri̇̀ms	dukróms
seseri̇̀ms	sẽsėms
dieveri̇̀ms	di̇́everiams
mė́nesims	mė́nesiams
	judesiáms
	žmonė́ms
vandeni̇̀ms*	vandenáms
akmeni̇̀ms	akmenáms
šuni̇̀ms	šùniams
danti̇̀ms	dañčiams
pati̇́ems	
	pačióms
palikuoni̇̀ms	palikuõniams, ėms
rūgšti̇̀ms	rū̃gščiams; rū́gštėms

Accusative
III-V d.	I-II d.
óbelis	
móteris	
dùkteris	dukràs
sẽseris	sesès
di̇́everis	di̇́everius
mė́nesis	mė́nesius
	jùdesius
	žmónes
vándenis	vándenius
ãkmenis	ãkmenus
šuni̇̀s	šuniùs
danti̇̀s	dančiùs
	pačiùs
	pačiàs
palikuoni̇̀s	palikuoniùs, ès
rū́gštis	rūgščiùs; rū́gštes

Instrumental
III-V d.	I-II d.
obelimi̇̀s	
móterimis	
dukterimi̇̀s	dukróms
seserimi̇̀s	sẽsėms
dieverimi̇̀s	di̇́everiais
mė́nesimis	mė́nesiais
	judesiai̇̃s
	žmonėmi̇̀s
vandenimi̇̀s	vandenai̇̃s, -iai̇̃s
akmenimi̇̀s	akmenai̇̃s, -iai̇̃s
šunimi̇̀s	šùniais
dantimi̇̀s	dañčiais
	pačiai̇̃s
	pačiomi̇̀s
palikuonimi̇̀s	palikuõniais, ėmis
rūgštimi̇̀s	rū̃gščiais; rū́gštėmis

Locative
III-V d.	I-II d.
obelysè	
móteryse	
dukterysè	dukrosè
seserysè	sẽsėse
dieverysè	di̇́everiuose
mė́nesyse	mė́nesiuose
	judesiuosè
	žmonėsè
vandenysè	vandenuosè
akmenysè	akmenuosè
šunysè	šuniuose
dantysè	dančiuose
	pačiuosè
	pačiosè
palikuonysè	palikuõniuose, ėse
rūgštysè	rū̃gščiuose; rū́gštėse

== Declension by paradigm ==
=== a-paradigm ===
The a-paradigm is used to decline:

- first-declension nouns
- adjectives of the first declension (masculine forms)
- third-declension adjectives (masculine forms, palatalized sub-paradigm)
- masculine pronouns, except pats 'own, self'
- passive (the main sub-paradigm) or active (the palatalized sub-paradigm) participles
- ordinal numerals (masculine forms, adjective inflections)
- many cardinal numbers (masculine; see list)

The a-paradigm is the most complex declension paradigm. It has two sub-paradigms, one of which is the main paradigm. The second sub-paradigm is known as "palatalized": the last consonant of the stem before the inflection is always palatalized. The a-paradigm is masculine.

==== Main sub-paradigm ====
Tas 'that', rudas 'brown', namas 'house'

	Singular			Plural		
	Pronoun	Adjective	Noun	Pronoun	Adjective	Noun
Nominative	tas	rudas	namas	tie	rudi	namai
Genitive	to	rudo	namo	tų	rudų	namų
Dative	tam	rudam	namui	tiems	rudiems	namams
Accusative	tą	rudą	namą	tuos	rudus	namus
Instrumental	tuo	rudu	namu	tais	rudais	namais
Locative	tame	rudame	name	tuose	ruduose	namuose
Illative	tan	rudan	naman	tuosna	ruduosna	namuosna
Vocative			name			namai

The -e ending in vocative singular applies only to common nouns; proper nouns take the ending -ai: Jonas 'John (nominative)', Jonai! 'John! (vocative)'.

==== Palatalized sub-paradigm ====
Šis 'this', žalias 'green', uosis 'ash tree'

	Singular			Plural		
	Pronoun	Adjective	Noun	Pronoun	Adjective	Noun
Nominative	šis	žalias	uosis	šie	žali	uosiai
Genitive	šio	žalio	uosio	šių	žalių	uosių
Dative	šiam	žaliam	uosiui	šiems	žaliems	uosiams
Accusative	šį	žalią	uosį	šiuos	žalius	uosius
Instrumental	šiuo	žaliu	uosiu	šiais	žaliais	uosiais
Locative	šiame	žaliame	uosyje	šiuose	žaliuose	uosiuose
Illative	šian	žalian	uosin	šiuosna	žaliuosna	uosiuosna
Vocative			uosi			uosiai

Nominative singular nouns are inflected -is, -ys or -ias, depending on the word. Pronouns always have the inflection -is. Singular accusative inflection depends on its singular-nominative counterpart. If the singular nominative ends in -ias, a word has -ią in singular accusative; otherwise, it is inflected -į. Singular-vocative inflection follows the singular nominative:

Nominative	Vocative
-is	-i
-ys	-y
-ias	-e or -iau

==== Pronouns ====
Some pronouns (kas 'who, what', kažkas 'somebody, something'; tas 'that', šitas 'this', etc.) use the main sub-paradigm; others (jis 'he', šis 'this', kuris- 'which', etc.) use the palatalized. The pronouns koks 'what (quality)', kažkoks 'somewhat', toks 'such', šitoks - 'such (demonstrative)' and kitoks 'different, other' have the inflection -s instead of the regular -is in singular nominative. The pronoun kitas 'another, other' is declined with adjectival inflections. A few indefinite-gender pronouns, such as kas 'who, what' or kažkas 'somebody, something', do not use the a-paradigm. The indefinite-gender personal pronouns aš 'I', tu 'you, thou', mes 'we' and jūs 'you (plural)' have their own specific paradigm. The pronoun pats 'own, self' uses the i-paradigm.

==== Numbers ====
The main sub-paradigm is used with all masculine ordinal numbers and all collective numbers. The palatalized sub-paradigm is used with all numbers in masculine plural. Cardinal numbers which use the adjectival palatalized sub-paradigm are:

- keturi 'four'
- penki 'five'
- šeši 'six'
- septyni 'seven'
- aštuoni 'eight'
- devyni 'nine'

Cardinal numbers which inflect a-paradigm nouns in singular and plural are:

- šimtas 'a hundred'
- tūkstantis 'a thousand'
- milijonas 'a million'
- milijardas 'a billion', and other internationally-accepted words for large numbers.

Some cardinal numbers have their own specific paradigms. Du 'two' uses a paradigm of the dual number. Trys 'three' uses a paradigm similar to the i-paradigm. Dešimt 'ten' is undeclined.

===== Numbers which do not use the a-paradigm =====
Masculine numbers which do not use the a-paradigm are:

- du 'two' (dual number; has a special paradigm)
- trys 'three' (i-paradigm)
- vienuolika '11'
- dvylika '12'
- trylika '13'
- keturiolika '14'
- penkiolika '15'
- šešiolika '16'
- septyniolika '17'
- aštuoniolika '18'
- devyniolika '19' (the numbers vienuolika and devyniolika are singular o-paradigm words)
- dešimt 'ten' (undeclinable; "dešimtis" is sometimes an i-paradigm word)

Feminine numbers use the o-paradigm.

==== Nominatives of active participles ====
	Singular		Plural	
	Short	Long	Short	Long
Present tense	-ąs	-antis	-ą	-antys
Present tense (palatalized)	-iąs	-iantis	-ią	-iantys
Past tense	-ęs		-ę	
Future tense	-siąs	-siantis	-sią	-siantys

Short forms of the nominatives skip the active participle suffix -(i)ant-, e.g. miegantis 'sleeping' (masculine singular long form) - miegąs (id. short form), sakantys 'saying' (masculine plural long form) - saką (id. short form). Past tense does not have long forms.

=== u-paradigm ===
The masculine u-paradigm is used to decline fourth-declension nouns and second-declension adjectives. It has two sub-paradigms: main and palatalized. The palatalization mark (the letter i) is part of the inflection. Some u-paradigm inflections differ between nouns and adjectives.

==== Main sub-paradigm ====
Drąsus 'brave', sūnus 'son'

	Singular		Plural	
	Adjective	Noun	Adjective	Noun
Nominative	drąsus	sūnus	drąsūs	sūnūs
Genitive	drąsaus	sūnaus	drąsių	sūnų
Dative	drąsiam	sūnui	drąsiems	sūnums
Accusative	drąsų	sūnų	drąsius	sūnus
Instrumental	drąsiu	sūnumi	drąsiais	sūnumis
Locative	drąsiame	sūnuje	drąsiuose	sūnuose
Illative	drąsian	sūnun	drąsiuosna	sūnuosna
Vocative		sūnau		sūnūs

==== Palatalized sub-paradigm ====
Narsus 'brave, hardy', karalius 'king'

	Singular		Plural	
	Adjective	Noun	Adjective	Noun
Nominative	narsus	karalius	narsūs	karaliai
Genitive	narsaus	karaliaus	narsių	karalių
Dative	narsiam	karaliui	narsiems	karaliams
Accusative	narsų	karalių	narsius	karalius
Instrumental	narsiu	karaliumi	narsiais	karaliais
Locative	narsiame	karaliuje	narsiuose	karaliuose
Illative	narsian	karaliun	narsiuosna	karaliuosna
Vocative		karaliau		karaliai

The sub-paradigm for adjectives is identical to the main sub-paradigm and is mixed-type, with some inflections palatalized and others not. The plural of nouns is identical to that of a-paradigm nouns (the palatalized sub-paradigm).

=== o-paradigm ===
The o-paradigm is used to decline:

- Second-declension nouns whose singular nominative ends with -a or -i
- Feminine first-declension adjectives
- Feminine second-declension adjectives (palatalized sub-paradigm)
- Feminine pronouns
- Feminine passive (main sub-paradigm) or active (palatalized sub-paradigm) participles
- Feminine ordinal numbers (main sub-paradigm)
- Cardinal numbers from vienuolika 'eleven' and dvylika 'twelve' to devyniolika 'nineteen'
- Feminine cardinal numbers, except trys 'three'.

==== Main sub-paradigm ====
Ta 'that', ruda 'brown', meška 'bear'

	Singular	Plural
Nominative	ta ruda meška	tos rudos meškos
Genitive	tos rudos meškos	tų rudų meškų
Dative	tai rudai meškai	toms rudoms meškoms
Accusative	tą rudą mešką	tas rudas meškas
Instrumental	ta ruda meška	tomis rudomis meškomis
Locative	toje rudoje meškoje	tose rudose meškose
Illative	ton rudon meškon	tosna rudosna meškosna
Vocative	meška	meškos

==== Palatalized sub-paradigm ====
Ši 'this', stipri 'strong, potent', galia 'power'

	Singular	Plural
Nominative	ši stipri galia	šios stiprios galios
Genitive	šios stiprios galios	šių stiprių galių
Dative	šiai stipriai galiai	šioms stiprioms galioms
Accusative	šią stiprią galią	šias stiprias galias
Instrumental	šia stipria galia	šiomis stipriomis galiomis
Locative	šioje stiprioje galioje	šiose stipriose galiose
Illative	šion stiprion galion	šiosna stipriosna galiosna
Vocative	galia	galios

Palatalized sub-paradigm words may have -i or -ia in singular nominative. First-declension adjectives have -ia, and second-declension adjectives have -i in singular nominative.

==== Pronouns ====
Some pronouns (ta 'that', šita 'this', etc.) use the main sub-paradigm; others (ji 'he', ši 'this', kuri 'which', etc.) use palatalized. A few pronouns do not use the o-paradigm. The indefinite-gender personal pronouns aš 'I', tu 'you, thou', mes 'we' and jūs 'you' (plural) have specific paradigms. The indefinite-gender pronouns kas 'who, what' and kažkas 'somebody, something' use the a-paradigm.

==== Numbers ====
The i-paradigm (main sub-paradigm) is used with feminine ordinal numbers. The a-paradigm (palatalized sub-paradigm) is used with all feminine numbers. Cardinal numbers using the o-paradigm (palatalized sub-paradigm) in feminine plural are:

- keturios 'four'
- penkios 'five'
- šešios 'six'
- septynios 'seven'
- aštuonios 'eight'
- devynios 'nine'

Cardinal numbers which use the o-paradigm (palatalized sub-paradigm) in feminine singular are:

- vienuolika '11'
- dvylika '12'
- trylika '13'
- keturiolika '14'
- penkiolika '15'
- šešiolika '16'
- septyniolika '17'
- aštuoniolika '18'
- devyniolika '19'

The numbers vienuolika to devyniolika have the inflection -a instead of -ą in singular accusative. Some cardinal numbers have specific paradigms; dvi 'two' (feminine) uses a paradigm of the dual number, and trys 'three' uses a paradigm similar to the i-paradigm.

=== ė-paradigm ===
The ė-paradigm is used to decline second-declension nouns which end with -ė in nominative singular and feminine third-declension adjectives.

Didelė 'big', upė 'river'

	Singular	Plural
Nominative	didelė upė	didelės upės
Genitive	didelės upės	didelių upių
Dative	didelei upei	didelėms upėms
Accusative	didelę upę	dideles upes
Instrumental	didele upe	didelėmis upėmis
Locative	didelėje upėje	didelėse upėse
Illative	didelėn upėn	didelėsna upėsna
Vocative	upe	upės

The plural genitive is palatalized (-ių).

=== i-paradigm ===
The i-paradigm is used to decline third- and fifth-declension nouns, the masculine pronoun pats 'own, self', and the number trys 'three'. All use the unsuffixed sub-paradigm except first-declension nouns, which use the suffixed sub-paradigm.

==== Unsuffixed sub-paradigm ====
Pilis 'castle', vagis 'thief'

	Singular		Plural	
	Feminine	Masculine	Feminine	Masculine
Nominative	pilis	vagis	pilys	vagys
Genitive	pilies	vagies	pilių	vagių
Dative	piliai	vagiui	pilims	vagims
Accusative	pilį	vagį	pilis	vagis
Instrumental	pilimi	vagimi	pilimis	vagimis
Locative	pilyje	vagyje	pilyse	vagyse
Illative	pilin	vagin	pilysna	vagysna
Vocative	pilie	vagie	pilys	vagys

Many words, such as žąsis - žąsų 'goose', naktis - naktų 'night' and debesis - debesų 'cloud', have -ų instead of -ių in plural genitive. Pats 'own, self' and trys 'three' are declined as follows:

	Singular	Plural	
	Pronoun	Number	Pronoun
Nominative	pats	trys	patys
Genitive	paties	trijų	pačių
Dative	pačiam	trims	patiems
Accusative	patį	tris	pačius
Instrumental	pačiu	trimis	pačiais
Locative	pačiame	m. trijuose / f. trijose	pačiuose
Illative	pačian	m. trijuosna / f. trijosna	pačiuosna

Pats is declined only in masculine in this table. Its feminine form, pati is declined with the o-paradigm.

==== Suffixed sub-paradigm ====
Akmuo 'stone', sesuo 'sister'

	Singular		Plural	
	Masculine	Feminine	Masculine	Feminine
Nominative	akmuo	sesuo	akmenys	seserys
Genitive	akmens	sesers	akmenų	seserų
Dative	akmeniui	seseriai	akmenims	seserims
Accusative	akmenį	seserį	akmenis	seseris
Instrumental	akmeniu	seserimi	akmenimis	seserimis
Locative	akmenyje	seseryje	akmenyse	seseryse
Illative	akmenin	seserin	akmenysna	seserysna
Vocative	akmenie	seserie	akmenys	seserys

Cases other than singular nominative have the suffix -en- for masculine words and -er- for feminine words. Two feminine words use the suffixed subparadigm: duktė 'daughter' and sesuo 'sister'. Duktė 'daughter' has the inflection -ė instead of -uo in singular nominative. šuo 'dog' has the suffix -un- instead of -en-. Sesuo 'sister' has a synonym, sesė, which uses the ė-paradigm.

=== Dual number ===
The dual number has specific inflections which are similar to plural inflections, with some differences:

- Masculine nominative, accusative or vocative words end with -(i)u; feminine words end with -i.
- Genitive and locative are identical in singular and plural.
- Dative has the plural inflection, without the final -s; -(i)ams, -iems, -(i)oms, -ėms, -ims in plural are -(i)am, -iem, -(i)om, -ėm, -im, respectively, in dual.
- Instrumental has the same inflections as dual dative, but is pronounced differently.

Whether -(i) in the brackets is used varies by paradigm. The masculine i-paradigm always has -iu in nominative. Du 'two' has three stem modifications: d- (nominative and accusative), dv- (dative and instrumental) and dviej- (genitive and locative). Mudu 'we (both)', judu 'you (both)', juodu 'they (both, masculine)', jiedvi 'they (both, feminine)', šiuodu 'these (both)', tuodu 'that (both)', abudu 'both', and their feminine counterparts have a paradigm based on the declension of du 'two'.

=== Shortened inflections ===
Inflections with two or more syllables are often shortened, eliding (omitting) the final short vowel. Shortened inflections are common in spoken language, but full inflections are preferred in writing. Elisions occur in:

- Singular locative: The inflections -ame, -yje, -oje and -ėje may be shortened to -am, -y(j), -oj and -ėj.
- Plural instrumental: The feminine inflections -omis, -ėmis and -imis may be shortened to -om, -ėm and -im. These inflections coincide with of dual-number inflections.
- Plural dative has one-syllable inflections which are sometimes shortened (skipping the final -s) to -am, -iem, -om, -ėm or -im. These inflections also coincide with their respective dual-number inflection.
- Plural locative: The masculine inflection -uose may be shortened to -uos.

== Interlanguage comparisons ==
Noun declension in its different patterns may be compared with Latin, Sanskrit, Latvian, Old Prussian, Gothic, Ancient Greek and Russian. Because Old Prussian has left a limited literature without all the cases of all the stems, the Prussian samples are not full in the tables; existing cases have been reconstructed by linguists. Prussian had fewer cases than modern Lithuanian; mixed declension patterns were more common as the Old Prussians adopted other languages particularly German. Lithuanian declension varies by dialect.

Nom.
Gen.
Dat.
Acc.
Inst.
Loc.
Voc.

Nom.
Gen.
Dat.
Acc.
Inst.
Loc.

wolf			father	day	man	wolf
vil̃kas	vṛ́kas	lupus	tavs	dags	ἄνθρωπος	волк
vil̃ko	vṛ́kasya	lupī	tavas	dagis	ἀνθρώπου	во́лка
vil̃kui	vṛ́kāya	lupō	tavu	daga	ἀνθρώπῳ	во́лку
vil̃ką	vṛ́kam	lupum	tavan	dag	ἄνθρωπον	во́лка
vilkù	vṛ́keṇa	(lupō)				во́лком
vilkè	vṛ́ke	(in lupō /-ī)				в во́лке
vil̃ke	vṛ́ka	lupe		dag	ἄνθρωπε	(во́лче)
vilkai̇̃		lupī	tavai	dagōs	ἄνθρωποι	во́лки
vilkų̃	vṛ́kāṇām	lupōrum	tavan	dagē	ἀνθρώπων	волко́в
vilkáms	vṛ́keb^{h}yas	lupīs	tavamans	dagam	ἀνθρώποις	волка́м
vilkùs	vṛ́kān	lupōs	tavans	dagans	ἀνθρώπους	волко́в
vilkai̇̃s	vṛ́kais	(lupīs)				волка́ми
vilkuosè	vṛ́keṣu	(in lupīs)				в волка́х

language		star	gift	army	country
kalbà	lingua	lauksno	giba	στρατιά	страна́
kalbõs	linguae /-ās	lauksnos	gibōs	στρατιᾶς	страны́
kal̃bai	linguae	lauksnai	gibái	στρατιᾷ	стране́
kal̃bą	linguam	lauksnan	giba	στρατιάν	страну́
kalbà	linguā				страно́й
kalbojè	in linguā /-ae				в стране́
kal̃ba	lingua			στρατιά	(стра́нo)
kal̃bos	linguae /-ās	lauksnos	gibōs	στρατιαί	стра́ны
kalbų̃	linguārum	lauksnun	gibō	στρατιῶν	стран
kalbóms	linguīs /-ābus	lauksnomans	gibōm	στρατιαῖς	стра́нам
kalbàs	linguās	lauksnans	gibōs	στρατιάς	стра́ны
kalbomi̇̀s	linguīs /-ābus				стра́нами
kalbosè	in linguīs				в стра́нах

The first-declension singular nominative ends in -as; singular accusative ends in -ą. Latin words with this stem end in -us in singular nominative and -um in singular accusative. When Latin endings followed a labial consonant, their vowel was originally ŏ: equos 'horse' – equom; servos 'slave, serf' – servom. Singular nominative in Prussian and Gothic is shortened: tavs, dags. Such shortening is present in western and northern Lithuanian dialects: tėvas 'father' and tėvs; dagas 'heat of the sun' and dags. Old Prussian had only a shortened form, which developed in some nouns: kaimis / kaimⁱs 'village'. Lithuanian and Latvian have no neuter nouns except for Lithuanian butas 'apartment, living place'. The Lithuanian instrumental -u derives from an older -uo: gerù (nominative singular gẽras 'good') and gerúo-ju (nominative singular geràsis 'that good one'), juõ (nominative singular 'jis'). The Lithuanian diphthong uo corresponds to the Latin ō. In dative singular, a -uo ending is present in dialects. Lithuanian accusative singular and genitive plural are written with an ogonek (ą and ų) indicating that the sound is long. The sounds were historically nasal (vilką < vilkan, vilkų < vilkun), and the -n sound still occurs in north-west Samogitia. The Lithuanian singular genitive vilko (dialect vilkā) corresponds to the Russian во́лка.

Nom.
Gen.
Dat.
Acc.
Inst.
Loc.
Voc.

Nom.
Gen.
Dat.
Acc.
Inst.
Loc.

stone		man m	sharp point n	name m	man m	heart n	shepherd m	name n
akmuõ	aśmā	homō	acūmen	emen	guma	haírtō	ποιμήν	и́мя
akmeñs	aśmanas	hominis	acūminis	emnis	gumins	haírtins	ποιμένος	и́мени
ãkmeniui	aśmane	hominī	acūminī	emnei	gumin	haírtin	ποιμένι	и́мени
ãkmenį	aśmānam	hominem	acūmen	emnin	guman	haírtō	ποιμένα	и́мя
akmenimi̇̀	aśmanā	homine	acūmine					и́менем
akmenyjè	aśmani	in homine /-ī	in acūmine /-ī					и́мени
akmeniẽ	aśman	homō	acūmen				ποιμήν	и́мя
ãkmenys	aśmānas	hominēs	acūmina		gumans	haírtōna	ποιμένες	имена́
akmenų̃	aśmanām	hominum	acūminum		gumanē	haírtanē	ποιμένων	имён
akmeni̇̀ms	aśmab^{h}yas	hominibus	acūminibus		gumam	haírtam	ποιμέσι(ν)	имена́м
ãkmenis	aśmanas	hominēs	acūmina	emnins	gumans	haírtōna	ποιμένας	имена́
akmenimi̇̀s	aśmab^{h}is	hominibus	acūminibus					имена́ми
akmenysè	aśmasu	in hominibus	in acūminibus					в имена́х

Nom.
Gen.
Dat.
Acc.
Inst.
Loc.
Voc.

Nom.
Gen.
Dat.
Acc.
Inst.
Loc.

castle f	tower f	trouble f	wife f	guest m	city	part f
pili̇̀s	turris	nautis	qēns	gasts	πόλις	часть
piliẽs	turris	nauteis	qēnáis	gasts	πόλεως	ча́сти
pi̇̀liai	turrī	nautei	qēnái	gasta	πόλει	ча́сти
pi̇̀lį	turrim	nautin	qēn	gast	πόλιν	часть
pilimi̇̀	turrī					ча́стью
pilyjè	in turrī					в части́
piliẽ	turris		qēn	gast	πόλι	(ча́сти)
pi̇̀lys	turrēs	nautis	qēneis	gasteis	πόλεις	ча́сти
pilių̃	turrium		qēnē	gastē	πόλεων	часте́й
pili̇̀ms	turribus	nautimans	qēnim	gastim	πόλεσι	частя́м
pili̇̀s	turrēs /-īs	nautins	qēnins	gastins	πόλεις	ча́сти
pilimi̇̀s	turribus					частя́ми
pilysè	in turribus					в частя́х

night f
nakti̇̀s	náktis	nox
naktiẽs	náktyās	noctis
nãkčiai	náktyai	noctī
nãktį	náktim	noctem
naktimi̇̀	náktyā	(nocte)
naktyjè	náktau	(in nocte)
naktiẽ	nákte	nox
nãktys	náktayas	noctēs
naktų̃	náktīnām	noctium
nakti̇̀ms	náktib^{h}yas	noctibus
nakti̇̀s	náktīs	noctēs
naktimi̇̀s	náktib^{h}is	(noctibus)

Nom.
Gen.
Dat.
Acc.
Inst.
Loc.
Voc.

Nom.
Gen.
Dat.
Acc.
Inst.
Loc.

top*	lake*	fount*	son		fish	son
viršùs	lacus	apus	sunus	sūnús	ἰχθύς	сынъ
viršaũs	lacūs	apus	sunáus	sūnós, sūnvàs	ἰχθύος	сыноу
vir̃šui	lacuī	apu	sunáu	sūnáve / sūnvè	ἰχθύϊ	сынови
vir̃šų	lacum	apun	sunu	sūnúm	ἰχθύν	сынъ
viršumi̇̀	lacū			sūnúnā		сынъмъ
viršujè	in lacū /-i			sūnaú		сыноу
viršaũ	lacus		sunu	sū́no	ἰχθύ	сыноу
vir̃šūs	lacūs		sunjus	sūnávas	ἰχθύες	сынове
viršų̃	lacuum		suniwē	sūnūnā́m (cf. dual sūnvóḥ)	ἰχθύων	сыновъ
viršùms	lacubus		sunum	sūnúb^{h}yas	ἰχθύσι	сынъмъ
viršùs	lacūs	apuns	sununs	sūnū́n	ἰχθῦς	сыны
viršumi̇̀s	lacubus			sūnúb^{h}is		сынъми
viršuosè	in lacubus			sūnúṣu		сынъхъ

flower	thing		earth	technique
gėlė̃	rayís	rēs	zemē	τέχνη
gėlė̃s	rayés / rayyàs	reī	zemēs	τέχνης
gė̃lei	rayáye / rayyè	reī	zemei	τέχνῃ
gė̃lę	rayím	rem	zemen	τέχνην
gėlè	rayyā̀	(rē)
gėlėjè	rayaú	(in rē /-eis)
gė̃le	ráye	rēs		τέχνη
gė̃lės	rayáyas	rēs	zemēs	τέχναι
gėlių̃	rayīṇā́m	rērum		τεχνῶν
gėlė́ms	rayíb^{h}yas	rēbus	zemēmans	τέχναις
gėlès	rayī́s, rayī́n	rēs	zemens	τέχνᾱς
gėlėmi̇̀s	rayíb^{h}is	(rēbus)
gėlėsè	rayíṣu	(in rēbus)

=== Lithuanian and Latvian ===
Lithuanian declensional endings are compared with Latvian in the table:

	first declension				second declension			third d.		fourth d.		fifth d.		adjectives
	masculine				feminine			f	m	m		m	f	m	f
	-ǎ-	-i-			-o-		-ė-	-i-		-u-		-i-		-ǎ-	-o-
sg.
Nom.	-as	-is	-ys	-ias	-a	-ia	-ė	-is		-us	-ius	-uo		-as	-a
Gen.	-o	-io			-os	-ios	-ės	-ies		-aus	-iaus	-en-s	-er-s	-o	-os
Dat.	-ui	-iui			-ai	-iai	-ei	-iai	-iui	-ui	-iui	-en-iui	-er-iai	-am	-ai
Acc.	-ą	-į		-ią	-ą	-ią	-ę	-į		-ų	-ių	-en-į	-er-į	-ą	-ą
Ins.	-u	-iu			-a	-ia	-e	-imi		-umi	-iumi	-en-iu	-er-imi	-u	-a
Loc.	-e	-yje			-oje	-ioje	-ėje	-yje		-uje	-iuje	-en-yje	-er-yje	-ame	-oje
Voc.	-e	-i	-y		-a	-ia	-e	-ie		-au	-iau	-en-ie	-er-ie	-as	-a
pl.
Nom.	-ai	-iai			-os	-ios	-ės	-ys		-ūs	-iai	-en-ys	-er-ys	-i	-os
Gen.	-ų	-ių			-ų	-ių	-ių	-ių		-ų	-ių	-en-ų	-er-ų	-ų	-ų
Dat.	-ams	-iams			-oms	-ioms	-ėms	-ims		-ums	-iams	-en-ims	-er-ims	-iems	-oms
Acc.	-us	-ius			-as	-ias	-es	-is		-us	-ius	-en-is	-er-is	-us	-as
Ins.	-ais	-iais			-omis	-iomis	-ėmis	-imis		-umis	-iais	-en-imis	-er-imis	-ais	-omis
Loc.	-uose	-iuose			-ose	-iose	-ėse	-yse		-uose	-iuose	-en-yse	-er-yse	-uose	-ose
Latvian:
	I (m)	II (m)			IV (f)		V (f)	VI (f)		III (m)		II (m)		m	f
	-ǎ-	-i-			-ā-		-ē-	-i-		-u-		-i-		-ǎ-	-ā-
sg.
Nom.	-s, -š	-is			-a		-e	-s		-us		-en-s		-s, -š	-a
Gen.	-a	-a*			-as		-es	-s		-us		-en-s		-a	-as
Dat.	-am	-im			-ai		-ei	-ij		-um		-en-im		-am	-ai
Acc.	-u	-i			-u		-i	-i		-u		-en-i		-u	-u
Ins.	-u	-i			-u		-i	-i		-u		-en-i		-u	-u
Loc.	-ā	-ī			-ā		-ē	-ī		-ū		-en-ī		-ā	-ā
pl.
Nom.	-i	-i*			-as		-es	-is		-i		-eņ-i*		-i	-as
Gen.	-u	-u*			-u		-u*	-u		-u		-eņ-u*		-u	-u
Dat.	-iem	-iem*			-ām		-ēm	-īm		-iem		-eņ-iem*		-iem	-ām
Acc.	-us	-us*			-as		-es	-is		-us		-eņ-us*		-us	-as
Ins.	-iem	-iem*			-ām		-ēm	-īm		-iem		-eņ-iem*		-iem	-ām
Loc.	-os	-os*			-ās		-ēs	-īs		-os		-eņ-os*		-os	-ās
