= Declension =

Inflection of words according to number, gender, and/or case

In linguistics, declension (verb: to decline) is the changing of the form of a word, generally to express its syntactic function in the sentence by way of an inflection. Declension may apply to nouns, pronouns, adjectives, adverbs, and determiners. It serves to indicate number (e.g. singular, dual, plural), case (e.g. nominative, accusative, genitive, or dative), gender (e.g. masculine, feminine, or neuter), and a number of other grammatical categories. Inflectional change of verbs is called conjugation.

Declension occurs in many languages. It is an important aspect of language families like Quechuan (i.e., languages native to the Andes), Indo-European (e.g. German, Icelandic, Irish, Lithuanian and Latvian, Slavic, Sanskrit, Latin, Ancient and Modern Greek, Albanian, Romanian, Kurdish, and Modern Armenian), Bantu (e.g. Swahili, Zulu, Kikuyu), Semitic (e.g. Modern Standard Arabic), Finno-Ugric (e.g. Hungarian, Finnish, Estonian), and Turkic (e.g. Turkish).

Old English was an inflectional language, but largely abandoned inflectional changes as it evolved into Modern English. Though traditionally classified as synthetic, Modern English has become a mostly analytic language.

== English-speaking perspective ==
Unlike English, many languages use suffixes to specify subjects and objects or word relationships in general. These inflections identify the specific grammatical function of a word within a sentence, known as its case. Different endings mark words as the thing performing an action (subject), things directly receiving the action (direct object), things indirectly receiving the action and objects of prepositions (indirect object), objects of prepositions, and things possessed by other things (genitive).

Inflected languages have a freer word order than modern English, an analytic language in which word order identifies the subject and object. As an example, even though both of the following sentences consist of the same words, the meaning is different:

- "The dog chased a cat."
- "A cat chased the dog."

Hypothetically speaking, suppose English were a language with a more complex declension system in which cases were formed by adding the suffixes:

-no (for nominative singular), -ge (genitive), -da (dative), -ac (accusative), -lo (locative), -in (instrumental), -vo (vocative), -ab (ablative)

The first sentence above could be formed with any of the following word orders and would have the same meaning:

- "The dogno chased a catac."
- "A catac chased the dogno."
- "Chased a catac the dogno."

As a more complex example, the sentence:

- Mum, this little boy's dog was chasing a cat down our street!

becomes nonsensical in English if the words are rearranged (because there are no cases):

- A cat was down our street chasing dog this little boy's mum!

But if English were a highly inflected language, like Latin or some Slavic languages such as Croatian, both sentences could mean the same thing. They would both contain five nouns in five different cases: mum – vocative (hey!), dog – nominative (who?), boy – genitive (of whom?), cat – accusative (whom?), street – locative (where?); the adjective little would be in the same case as the noun it modifies (boy), and the case of the determiner our would agree with the case of the noun it determines (street).

Using the case suffixes invented for this example, the original sentence would read:

- Mumvo, thisge littlege boyge dogno was chasing a catac down ourlo streetlo!

And like other inflected languages, the sentence rearranged in the following ways would mean virtually the same thing, but with different expressiveness:

- A catac was down ourlo streetlo chasing dogno thisge littlege boyge, mumvo!
- Mumvo, down streetlo ourlo a catac was chasing thisge littlege boyge dogno!

Instead of the locative, the instrumental form of "down our street" could also be used:

- Mumvo, thisge littlege boyge dogno ourin streetin was chasing a catac!
- A catac was, mumvo, ourin streetin chasing dogno thisge littlege boyge
- Ourin streetin a catac was chasing dogno thisge littlege boyge, mumvo!

Different word orders preserving the original meaning are possible in an inflected language, while modern English relies on word order for meaning, with a little flexibility. This is one of the advantages of an inflected language. The English sentences above, when read without the made-up case suffixes, are confusing.

These contrived examples are relatively simple, whereas actual inflected languages have a far more complicated set of declensions, where the suffixes (or prefixes or infixes) change depending on the gender of the noun, the quantity of the noun, and other possible factors. This complexity and the possible lengthening of words is one of the disadvantages of inflected languages. Notably, many of these languages lack articles. There may also be irregular nouns where the declensions are unique for each word (like irregular verbs with conjugation). In inflected languages, other parts of speech such as numerals, demonstratives, adjectives, and articles are also declined.

== History ==
It is agreed that Ancient Greeks had a "vague" idea of the forms of a noun in their language. A fragment of Anacreon seems to confirm this idea. Nevertheless, it cannot be concluded that the Ancient Greeks actually knew what the cases were. The Stoics developed many basic notions that today are the rudiments of linguistics. The idea of grammatical cases is also traced back to the Stoics, but it is still not completely clear what the Stoics exactly meant with their notion of cases.

== Modern English ==
In Modern English, the system of declensions is so simple compared to some other languages that the term declension is rarely used.

=== Nouns ===
Most nouns in English have distinct singular and plural forms. Nouns and most noun phrases can form a possessive construction. Plurality is most commonly shown by the ending -s (or -es), whereas possession is always shown by the enclitic -'s or, for plural forms ending in s, by just an apostrophe.

Consider, for example, the forms of the noun girl. Most speakers pronounce all forms other than the singular plain form (girl) exactly the same. (Note: The elided possessive-indicating s of the plural possessive may be realised as [z] in some speakers' pronunciations, being separated from the plural-indicating s normally by a central vowel such as [ɨ̞].)

	Singular	Plural
Plain	girl	girls
Possessive	girl's	girls'

By contrast, a few irregular nouns (like man/men) are slightly more complex in their forms. In this example, all four forms are pronounced distinctly.

	Singular	Plural
Plain	man	men
Possessive	man's	men's

For nouns, in general, gender is not declined in Modern English. There are isolated situations where certain nouns may be modified to reflect gender, though not in a systematic fashion. Loan words from other languages, particularly Latin and the Romance languages, often preserve their gender-specific forms in English, e.g. alumnus (masculine singular) and alumna (feminine singular). Similarly, names borrowed from other languages show comparable distinctions: Andrew and Andrea, Paul and Paula, etc. Additionally, suffixes such as -ess, -ette, and -er are sometimes applied to create overtly gendered versions of nouns, with marking for feminine being much more common than marking for masculine. Many nouns can actually function as members of two genders or even all three, and the gender classes of English nouns are usually determined by their agreement with pronouns, rather than marking on the nouns themselves.

There can be other derivations from nouns that are not considered declensions. For example, the proper noun Britain has the associated descriptive adjective British and the demonym Briton. Though these words are clearly related, and are generally considered cognates, they are not specifically treated as forms of the same word, and thus are not declensions.

=== Pronouns ===
Pronouns in English have more complex declensions. For example, the first person "I":

	Singular	Plural
Subjective	I	we
Objective	me	us
Dependent possessive	my	our
Independent possessive	mine	ours

Whereas nouns do not distinguish between the subjective (nominative) and objective (oblique) cases, some pronouns do; that is, they decline to reflect their relationship to a verb or preposition, or case. Consider the difference between he (subjective) and him (objective), as in "He saw it" and "It saw him"; similarly, consider who, which is subjective, and the objective whom (although it is increasingly common to use who for both).

The one situation where gender (Note: Gender in English is not grammatical but natural gender.) is still clearly part of the English language is in the pronouns for the third person singular. Consider the following:

	Masculine	Feminine	Neuter	Epicenity
Subjective	he	she	it	they
Objective	him	her	it	them
Dependent possessive	his	her	its	their
Independent possessive	his	hers	its	theirs

The distinguishing of neuter for persons and non-persons is peculiar to English. This has existed since the 14th century. However, the use of singular they is sometimes restricted to specific contexts, depending on the speaker. (In which case it's used to refer to a single person of unknown gender (e.g. "someone left their jacket behind") or a hypothetical person where gender is insignificant (e.g. "If someone wants to, then they should").) Its use has expanded due to increasing social recognition of persons who do not identify themselves as female nor male (see gender-nonbinary). The singular they mostly still uses plural verb forms, reflecting its origins.

=== Adjectives and adverbs ===
Some English adjectives and adverbs are declined for degree of comparison. The unmarked form is the positive form, such as quick. Comparative forms are formed with the ending -er (quicker), while superlative forms are formed with -est (quickest). Some are uncomparable; the remainder are usually periphrastic constructions with more (more beautiful) and most (most modestly). See degree of comparison for more.

Adjectives are not declined for case in Modern English (though they were in Old English), nor number nor gender. (Note: A few adjectives borrowed from other languages are, or can be, declined for gender, at least in writing: blond (male) and blonde (female).)

=== Determiners ===
The demonstrative determiners this and that are declined for number, as these and those.

The article is never regarded as declined in Modern English, although formally, the words that and possibly she correspond to forms of the predecessor of the (sē m., þæt n., sēo f.) as it was declined in Old English.

== Latin ==
Just as verbs in Latin are conjugated to indicate grammatical information, Latin nouns and adjectives that modify them are declined to signal their roles in sentences. There are five important cases for Latin nouns: nominative, genitive, dative, accusative, and ablative. Since the vocative case usually takes the same form as the nominative, it is seldom spelt out in grammar books. Yet another case, the locative, is limited to a small number of words.

The usual basic functions of these cases are as follows:

- Nominative case indicates the subject.
- Genitive case indicates possession and can be translated with 'of'.
- Dative case marks the indirect object and can be translated with 'to' or 'for'.
- Accusative case marks the direct object.
- Ablative case is used to modify verbs and can be translated as 'by', 'with', 'from', etc.
- Vocative case is used to address a person or thing.

The genitive, dative, accusative, and ablative also have important functions to indicate the object of a preposition.

Given below is the declension paradigm of Latin puer 'boy' and puella 'girl':

Case	Singular	Plural	Singular	Plural
Nominative	puer	puerī	puella	puellae
Genitive	puerī	puerōrum	puellae	puellārum
Dative	puerō	puerīs	puellae	puellīs
Accusative	puerum	puerōs	puellam	puellās
Ablative	puerō	puerīs	puellā	puellīs
Vocative	puer	puerī	puella	puellae

From the provided examples we can see how cases work:

liber puerī
book boy.GEN
the book of the boy

puer puellae rosam dat
boy.NOM girl.DAT rose.ACC give.3SG.PRES
the boy gives the girl a rose

== Sanskrit ==
Sanskrit, another Indo-European language, has eight cases: nominative, vocative, accusative, genitive, dative, ablative, locative and instrumental. Some do not count vocative as a separate case, despite it having a distinctive ending in the singular, but consider it as a different use of the nominative.

Sanskrit grammatical cases have been analyzed extensively. The grammarian Pāṇini identified six semantic roles or karaka, which correspond closely to the eight cases:

- agent (kartṛ, related to the nominative)
- patient (karman, related to the accusative)
- means (karaṇa, related to the instrumental)
- recipient (sampradāna, related to the dative)
- source (apādāna, related to the ablative)
- relation (sambandha, related to genitive)
- locus (adhikaraṇa, related to the locative)
- address (sambodhana, related to the vocative)

For example, consider the following sentence:

vṛkṣ-āt parṇ-aṁ bhūm-āu patati
{from the tree} {a leaf} {to the ground} falls
"a leaf falls from the tree to the ground"

Here leaf is the agent, tree is the source, and ground is the locus. The endings -aṁ, -at, -āu mark the cases associated with these meanings.

Verse 37 of the Rāmarakṣāstotram gives an example of all 8 types of declensions in Sanskrit for the singular proper noun Rāma.

Verse	Case	Translation and remarks
Rāmo rājamaṇiḥ	Nominative	Rāma is a jewel among kings The case declension here is Rāmaḥ but the visarga has undergone sandhi.
sadā vijayate Rāmaṃ rameśaṃ bhaje	Accusative	Ever victorious, I worship that Rāma who is Ramā's lord. Both words 'Rāma Rameśa' are individually declined as 'rāmaṃ rameśaṃ
Rāmeṇābhihatā niśācaracamū	Instrumental	Rāma, by whose hands are the armies of demons annhiliated Rāmeṇa is the declension that underwent sandhi with the word abhihatā
Rāmāya tasmai namaḥ	Dative	I bow to that Rāma. Dative case is used here to show that Rāma is the receiver of the reverence.
Rāmānnāsti parāyaṇaṃ parataraṃ	Ablative	There is no better support than Rāma The declension here is Rāmāt that has undergone sandhi with nāsti. Ablative case is also used for comparisons in Sanskrit
Rāmasya dāso’smyahaṃ	Genitive	I am a servant of Rāma. Normal declension without sandhi.
Rāme cittalayaḥ sadā bhavatu me	Locative	Let my thoughts always be focused on Rāma. Locative case to indicate the 'focus of thoughts'
Bho Rāma māmuddhara!	Vocative	O Rāma save me! Vocative case uses the plain stem, unlike Nominative which adds a visarga. Sometimes vocative is considered to be a different use of nominative.

== Declension in specific languages ==
- Albanian declension
- Basque declension

=== Arabic ===
- Classical and Modern Standard Arabic declension (ʾIʿrab)

=== Greek and Latin ===
- Ancient Greek and Latin First declension
- Ancient Greek and Latin Second declension
- Ancient Greek and Latin Third declension
- Greek declension
- Latin declension

=== Celtic languages ===
- Irish declension

=== Germanic languages ===
- German declension
- Icelandic declension
- Gothic declension
- Dutch declension system (abandoned)
- Middle English declension

=== Baltic languages ===
- Latvian declension
- Lithuanian declension

=== Slavic languages ===
- Bosnian, Croatian, Montenegrin and Serbian declension
- Czech declension
- Polish declension
- Russian declension
- Slovak declension
- Slovene declension
- Ukrainian declension

=== Romance languages ===
- Romanian declension

=== Indo-Aryan languages ===
- Urdu and Hindi declension

=== Uralic languages ===
- Finnish noun cases

=== Languages that lost their declension system ===
- Modern Arabic dialects (incl. Maltese)
- Most Germanic languages:
  - English
  - Dutch
  - Danish
  - many Norwegian dialects
  - many Swedish dialects
- Most Romance languages:
  - Spanish
  - Portuguese
  - French
  - Italian
  - Catalan
- Some Slavic languages
  - Bulgarian
  - Macedonian
- Some Celtic languages
  - Welsh

== See also ==
- Grammatical conjugation
- Grammatical case
- Strong inflection
- Weak inflection
