= Casally modulated preposition =

Casally modulated prepositions are prepositions whose meaning is modified by the grammatical case their arguments take. The most common form of this type of preposition is bigovernate; that is the preposition may govern one of two cases.

== Bigovernate prepositions in German ==
There exist a reasonable number of bigovernate prepositions in German; these are an, auf, hinter, in, neben, über, unter, vor and zwischen. These prepositions can take either the accusative or dative grammatical cases. The accusative case is used when there is movement relative to the object with which the preposition agrees (e.g. I go into the cinema, "Ich gehe in das Kino") whereas the dative case is used when the subject of the preposition is static in relation to the object with which the preposition agrees (e.g. I am in the cinema, "Ich bin in dem Kino"), the difference here being between the definite article (das/dem).

== Bigovernate prepositions in Latin ==
There are fewer bigovernate prepositions in Latin, the most common of which are in, sub, subter and super. These can take either the accusative or ablative cases. The meaning is modified in a similar way to German. If the preposition takes the accusative then it carries connotations of motion whereas if it takes the ablative then it suggests that the subject of the preposition is at rest. Compare "eram in horto" (I was in the garden) with "veni in hortum" (I came into the garden). Unlike German the difference between these two examples is expressed through the case-endings on the nouns (horto [ABL]/hortum [ACC]). It is much easier to distinguish between the two examples in Latin because the ablative endings are always different from the accusative endings.

It has been suggested that the use of the ablative in this way arose on account of the merging of the locative and ablative cases.

== Polygovernate prepositions in Russian ==
Some prepositions in Russian are monogovernate, one such preposition being к 'towards' governing only the dative case. However, almost all prepositions govern two or even three cases.

As is the case in German and Latin, most spatial prepositions govern the locative case when there is no movement (some prepositions, however, govern the instrumental case). The same spatial prepositions govern the accusative case when their complement is the target of a movement:

- Я был в Риме I was in Rome (locative)
- Я иду в Рим I go to Rome (accusative)
- Яблоко лежало на земле The apple lay on the ground (locative)
- Яблоко упало на землю The apple fell on the ground (accusative)
- Птицы поют за дворцом Birds sing at the back of the palace (instrumental)
- Птицы улетели за дворец Birds flew to the back of the palace (accusative)

There are, however, prepositions whose meaning drastically changes when the case of their complement changes. The most frequently used such preposition is с(o), which means [together] with with the instrumental case, from with the genitive case and like with the accusative case:

- Он упал со стеной He fell down together with the wall (instrumental)
- Он упал со стены He fell from the wall (genitive)
- Он ростом со стену He is tall like a wall (accusative)

Note: The ablative and genitive cases conflated in Balto-Slavic and for this reason the genitive case has far more meanings and usages in the Slavic languages and Russian in particular, than in Latin, Greek or German. One particular example are the prepositions от (ot, from) and до (do, to) which although having opposite meanings both govern the genitive.

Other less frequently-used bigovernate prepositions are по (dative for on, along and accusative for up to) and о(б) (prepositional for about and accusative when the complement denotes an object of a clash or touch)

- По моим плечам ходили муравьи Ants walked on my shoulders (dative)
- Я стоял по плечи в муравейнике I was up to my shoulders in the anthill (accusative)
- О земле могу я много рассказывать About the Earth I can speak a lot (prepositional)
- Он ударился о землю He hit the Earth (accusative)

The preposition в(о) in normally governs either the locative or the accusative case, as with any other spatial preposition. However, when someone is elected, his post is the complement of the same preposition in the nominative plural. The following example contains both usages:

- Дмитрий Медведев был выбран в президенты в 2008-ом году Dmitry Medvedev was elected a president in 2008

== Polygovernate prepositions in Classical Greek ==
Classical Greek has several polygovernate prepositions, in addition to bigovernate and monogovernate prepositions.

ἐπί means on with the genitive case, onto with the genitive case and in with the dative case.

== Sources ==
- M.Spencer, M. McCrorie. Advanced German Grammar. London: Longman (2000).
- R.M.Griffin. Cambridge Latin Grammar. Cambridge: Cambridge University Press (1991).
