= Oxford Latin Dictionary =

Classical Latin dictionary by Oxford

- Author: P. G. W. Glare
- Language: English
- Publisher: Oxford University Press
- Publication date: 1968 to 1982; reprinted with corrections 1996; 2nd edition 2012
- Publication place: United Kingdom
- Media type: Print (Hardcover)
- Pages: 2,400
- ISBN: 978-0-19-958031-6
- Dewey Decimal: 473/.21 19
- LC Class: PA2365 .E5 O9 2012

The Oxford Latin Dictionary (or OLD) is the standard English lexicon of Classical Latin, compiled from sources written before AD 200. Begun in 1933, it was published in fascicles between 1968 and 1982; a lightly revised second edition was released in 2012.

The dictionary was created in order to meet the need for a more modern Latin-English dictionary than Lewis & Short's A Latin Dictionary (1879), while being less ambitious in scope than the Thesaurus Linguae Latinae (in progress). It is based on a re-reading of the classical sources in the light of advances in lexicography in the creation of the Oxford English Dictionary.

== History ==
Although Lewis and Short's Latin Dictionary was widely used in the English world by the end of the nineteenth century, its faults were widely felt among classicists. While Oxford University Press had attempted the creation of a new Latin dictionary as early as 1875, these projects failed. The OLD was spurred by the submission of a 1924 report by Alexander Souter on the deficiencies of Lewis and Short; he eventually became the dictionary's first editor. The compilation of the more than one million quotations on which the work is based began in 1933. After Souter's retirement in 1939, Cyril Bailey and J.M. Wyllie were appointed co-editors. From 1949, Wyllie was the sole editor, and he was replaced, following tensions among the editorial staff, in 1954 by P.G.W. Glare, who remained in the position until the completion of the lexicon. The dictionary was originally published in eight fascicles at two years intervals from 1968 until 1982. The complete dictionary contains c. 40,000 entries (covering 100,000 senses). Classicists generally well received it.

Other members of the editorial staff included C.O. Brink (1938–42), E.A. Parker (1939–46), M. Alford (1942–45), J. Chadwick (1946–52), B.V. Slater (1947–49), D.C. Browning (1949–50), W.M. Edwards (1950–69), J.D. Craig (1952–53), C.L. Howard (1952–58), G.E. Turton (1954–70), R.H. Barrow (1954–82), S. Trenkner (1955–57), R.C. Palmer (1957–82), G.M. Lee (1968–82), and D. Raven (1969–70).

In 2012, a second edition of the dictionary was published in two volumes (the binding of the 1982 single-volume edition tends to fall apart under the paper's weight); it removes some English translations now considered to be archaic and presents the material in a clearer fashion using the Arno typeface.

== Comparison with other dictionaries ==
Although the OLD was intended as a replacement for the Lewis and Short dictionary from 1879, the decision to exclude Latin written after AD 200 has drawn criticism from users. Lewis and Short's coverage of late and ecclesiastical Latin (if inconsistent), combined with its free availability online, has kept it in continuous use.

The Thesaurus Linguae Latinae has a far more ambitious scope than the OLD, but after more than 100 years, only two-thirds of this comprehensive dictionary has been published.

== See also ==
- A Latin Dictionary
- Dictionary of Medieval Latin from British Sources
- William Whitaker's Words
