= Margaret Alford =

Pioneering woman classicist

- Born: 5 September 1868; Leavenheath, Suffolk, England
- Died: 29 May 1951 (aged 82); Paddington, London, England
- Education: Girton College, Cambridge
- Occupations: Classicist: University Lecturer, Latin Teacher, Author of Commentaries on Latin Prose Editions

Margaret Alford (5 September 1868 – 29 May 1951) was an English classicist and pioneering academic who achieved a First at Cambridge University in 1887, a time when women were not formally awarded degrees. She spent more than two decades teaching at schools and universities, while publishing and editing many books. She specialised in Latin prose, particularly the works of Livy, Tacitus and Cicero, an area almost entirely dominated by male scholars.

== Education ==
Margaret Alford was born in Leavenheath, Suffolk, but spent most of her life in London. She was taught ancient Greek from an early age by her father, Bradley Hurt Alford, a Church of England clergyman and author. Her mother, Caroline Alexa Lyall, was the elder sister of Sir Charles James Lyall. Her sister was Dorothy Banks. She attended Maida Vale High School, a girls' day school in London. She spent two terms at Bedford College, London as a Trustees Scholar, before transferring to Girton College, Cambridge, where she graduated with a First in 1887 (although women were not awarded degrees from Cambridge at that time). Here JP Postgate, the well-known supporter of women in higher education, supervised her Latin prose composition. Her older sister, Dorothy (later Banks) studied Natural Sciences at the same college. Punch magazine noted, and satirised, the success of women in Classics at Cambridge at the time, and of the two women's colleges Girton and Newnham; Alford was mentioned as 'a Classical First' in a verse called The Ladies' Year

== Career ==
- 1891–1917: Visiting Lecturer at Girton College
- 1894–1919: Visiting Lecturer at Westfield College, London
- 1904–1909: Head of Department of Latin at Bedford College, London
- 1918–1943: Managed the periodicals for the joint Societies (Hellenic and Roman), and served on the council for the Hellenic Society

During the period of 1942-1945, she served as the only woman on the editorial staff of the Oxford Latin Dictionary. Alford worked on other books including Liddell-Scott-Jones's Greek-English Lexicon, Lampe's Patristic Greek Lexicon, and index to H. M. Allen's edition of the letters of Erasmus (Opus Epistolarum Des. Erasmi Roterdami)

== Awards and honours ==
- 1943: Elected to Honorary Fellowship of Girton
- 1943: Awarded with an honorary MA from the University of Oxford

== Published works ==
Throughout her career as a university lecturer, Alford published a number of books, mostly commentaries on Latin texts:

- Livy, Book V (London: Macmillan Elementary Classics, 1892)
- Latin prose for translation: for the use of higher forms in school and of students working for pass degrees (London: Macmillan & Co., 1902)
- Versions of Latin Passages for Translation (London: Macmillan, 1910)
- Tacitus, Histories, Book I (University of London Press, 1912)
- Cicero, Letters to Atticus, Book II (London: Macmillan Red, 1929)
- Livy, Book II (London: Macmillan Elementary Classics, 1933)
