= Leavenheath =

Village in Suffolk, England

Coordinates: 51.991°N 0.840°E

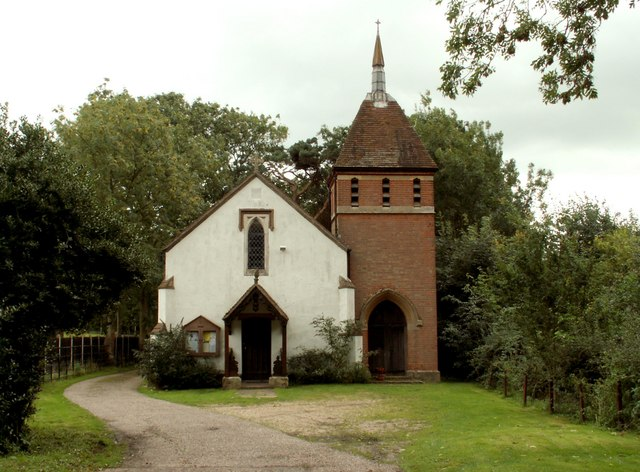
- St. Matthew, parish church of Leavenheath

- Location within Suffolk
- Population: 1,370
- District: Babergh
- Shire county: Suffolk
- Region: East
- Country: England
- Sovereign state: United Kingdom
- Post town: Colchester
- Postcode district: CO6

Leavenheath is a village and civil parish in Suffolk, England, close to the Essex border. Located on the A134 between Sudbury and Colchester, it is part of Babergh district. The parish also contains the hamlets of Cock Street and Honey Tye, and in 2001 had a population of 1,373, falling slightly to 1,370 at the 2011 Census.

The village was named after the Leaven Heath, an area of open land between Boxford, Bures, Nayland and Polstead. It does not have a village centre, but is separated into two parts around half a mile apart by Leaden Hall. The northern section is to the east of the A134, the southern section to the west. Such is the dispersed nature of the village, that it did not even have a church until St Matthew's was built, originally as a chapel of ease, in 1836, and was not designated as a parish until 1952; prior to that it was part of Stoke by Nayland Parish.

The south-eastern part of the parish is covered by the Dedham Vale AONB, whilst the south-west contains a section of the Arger Fen SSSI. In the east of the parish are The Carrs, a set of four ponds that feed the River Stour. Breach Grove and Leadenhall Woods are both designated nature reserves.

== Governance ==
An electoral ward in the same name exists. This ward includes Assington and has a total population of 1772 at the 2011 Census.

== Notable people ==
- Hannah Dodd (born 1995), actress
- Margaret Alford (1868–1951), academic
