= Gothic declension =

Declensions in the Gothic language

Gothic is an inflected language, and as such its nouns, pronouns, and adjectives must be declined in order to serve a grammatical function. A set of declined forms of the same word pattern is called a declension. There are five grammatical cases in Gothic with a few traces of an old sixth instrumental case.

== Grammatical cases ==
A complete declension consists of five grammatical cases.

=== Description of cases ===
- The nominative case, which is used to express the subject of a statement. It is also used with copulative verbs.
- The vocative case, which is used to address someone or something in direct speech. This case is indicated in English by intonation or punctuation, e.g. "Mary is going to the store" ("Mary" is nominative) compared to "Mary, are you going to the store?" or "Mary!" ("Mary" is vocative).
- The accusative case, which expresses the direct object of a verb. English does not have a distinct accusative case, though a small number of pronouns show different forms when they appear as direct or indirect object (e.g. he becoming him, she becoming her)
- The genitive case, which expresses possession, measurement, or source. The English possessive suffix enclitic "–'s" is derived from an earlier genitive case and is related to the common Gothic genitive suffix "-s", though its use in English is much more limited (non-possessive uses of the genitive case in Gothic are often translated in English using the word "of").
- The dative case, which expresses the recipient of an action, the indirect object of a verb. In English, the indirect object is generally expressed by word order (e.g. I gave Mary the book; she bought me lunch) or by prepositions such as to or for (I gave the book to Mary; she bought lunch for me).
- The instrumental case, which is used to express the place in or on which, or the time at which, an action is performed. The instrumental case only survives in a few preposition forms in Gothic.

=== Order of cases ===
Gothic language grammars often follow the common NOM-ACC-GEN-DAT order used for the Germanic languages. VOC is usually attached to the same line as ACC as a combined VOC-ACC, but if not, it may be placed between NOM and ACC (as in Wright's "Grammar of the Gothic Language").

=== Short vs. long stems ===
An important distinction in many of the declension classes below is the difference between "short" and "long" stems. Frequently declension classes are divided into two subclasses, one for short-stemmed nouns and one for long-stemmed nouns.

A short stem contains:

- Either a short vowel followed by at most a single consonant (consonants at the beginning of an ending do not count),
- Or a long vowel or diphthong with no following consonant (other than possibly a consonant at the beginning of an ending),

A long stem is all other types of stems:

- Either a long vowel or diphthong followed by at least a single consonant (not counting consonants at the beginning of an ending),
- Or a short vowel followed by at least two consonants (same caveat concerning consonants at the beginning of an ending),
- Or a word whose root (minus any prefixes and suffixes) is more than one syllable in length, e.g. ragineis "counsellor", with root ragin- and -eis being the long-stemmed -ja declension ending.

== Strong noun declensions ==
=== The -a declension ===
This declension has counterparts as the second declension (us/um) of Latin, and the omicron declension (os/on) of Greek. It contains masculine and neuter nouns.

Case	dags, dagōs day m.				waúrd, waúrda word n.			
Case	Singular		Plural		Singular		Plural	
Nominative (+ vocative plural)	dags	–s	dagōs	–ōs	waúrd	–	waúrda	–a
Accusative (+ vocative singular)	dag	–	dagans	–ans	waúrd	–	waúrda	–a
Genitive	dagis	–is	dagē	–ē	waúrdis	–is	waúrdē	–ē
Dative	daga	–a	dagam	–am	waúrda	–a	waúrdam	–am

A varied set of nouns have two stems, one occurring with endings that are null or begin with a consonant (the nominative, accusative and vocative singular) and another that occurs with endings beginning with a vowel (all but the previously listed forms).

One common situation leading to two-stem nouns is the automatic devoicing of voiced fricatives at (or near) the end of a word, e.g.:

- Stem ending in f changes in b. See table with further explanation below.
- Stem ending in short vowel + r does not receive s (-z) in the nominative case.
- Stem ending in -z does not lose the z in its nominative case. This has to do with the other cases and their pronounceability.
- The Gothic language lost its -z as it changed into a -s in many words, though it remained when it is protected by a particle. For example: wileiz-u? (wilt thou).

More information about the exceptions in the -a declension can be found at page 82, §175 of Grammar of the Gothic Language written by Joseph Wright. (Link can be found at the bottom.)

Case	hláifs, hláibōs loaf, bread m.				háubiþ, háubida head n.			
Case	Singular		Plural		Singular		Plural	
Nominative (+ vocative plural)	hláifs	–s	hláibōs	–ōs	háubiþ	–	háubida	–a
Accusative (+ vocative singular)	hláif	–	hláibans	–ans	háubiþ	–	háubida	–a
Genitive	hláibis	–is	hláibē	–ē	háubidis	–is	háubidē	–ē
Dative	hláiba	–a	hláibam	–am	háubida	–a	háubidam	–am

Other nouns with two stems are:

- masculine þius "servant" (accusative singular þiu but genitive singular þiwis, nominative plural þiwōs, etc.)
- neuter kniu "knee" (accusative singular kniu but genitive singular kniwis, nominative plural kniwa, etc.);
- neuter triu "tree" (forms parallel to kniu).

=== The -ja declension ===
This declension is really just the -a declension with a j immediately preceding. However, due to various sound laws, a new declension subcategory has arisen that does not exactly follow the form of the plain -a declension. Similar developments occurred in Greek and the Slavic languages, among others.

This declension has as counterparts the second declension nouns in (-ius/-ium) of Latin. The counterparts in Greek are some second declension nouns in (-ios/-ion), as well as many that show effects of palatalization (e.g., -zdos < *-gyos or *-dyos; -llos < *-lyos; -ptos < -*pyos; -ssos or -ttos < -*tyos; -airos/-eiros/-oiros < *-aryos/-eryos/-oryos; -ainos/-einos/-oinos < *-anyos/enyos/onyos; etc., and similarly for neuter nouns in -ion or *-yon). It contains masculine and neuter nouns.

Case	harjis, harjōs army m.				haírdeis, haírdjōs herdsman m.				kuni, kunja race n.			
Case	Singular		Plural		Singular		Plural		Singular		Plural	
Nominative (+ vocative plural)	harjis	–jis	harjōs	–jōs	haírdeis	–eis	haírdjōs	–jōs	kuni	-i	kunja	–ja
Accusative (+ vocative singular)	hari	-i	harjans	–jans	haírdi	-i	haírdjans	–jans	kuni	-i	kunja	–ja
Genitive	harjis	–jis	harjē	–jē	haírdeis	–eis	haírdjē	–jē	kunjis	–jis	kunjē	–jē
Dative	harja	–ja	harjam	–jam	haírdja	–ja	haírdjam	–jam	kunja	–ja	kunjam	–jam

The masculine nouns have a distinction between short- and long-stemmed nouns, as described above. harjis "army" is a prototypical short-stem noun, and haírdeis is a prototypical long-stem noun. Neuters, however, have merged the two types in favor of the short-stem endings. Properly, there should be a distinction in the genitive singular between short-stem -jis and long-stem -eis, as for the masculine nouns, but -jis has mostly taken over. For a few nouns, however, both forms can be used, as in genitive andbahteis or andbahtjis "of service", gawaírþeis or gawaírþjis "of peace", from neuter nouns andbahti "service" and gawaírþi "peace", respectively.

Note that the neuters in this declension can be said to follow the two-stem pattern (e.g. kuni vs. kunj-) described above for a-stems. A few neuters in this declension follow the same overall pattern but have additional vowel changes between the stems:

- gawi "region, district" (genitive gáujis)
- hawi "hay" (genitive háujis)
- taui "deed, work" (genitive tōjis)

=== The -ō declension ===
This declension counterparts the first declension (a) of Latin, and the alpha declension (a/as) of Greek. It contains feminine nouns.

Case	giba, gibōs gift f.			
Case	Singular		Plural	
Nominative-Accusative-Vocative	giba	–a	gibōs	–ōs
Genitive	gibōs	–ōs	gibō	–ō
Dative	gibái	–ái	gibōm	–ōm

=== The -jō declension ===
Nouns ending in -jō that have a short stem (see discussion above) behave identically to normal -ō stems, e.g. brakja "strife", sibja "relationship", sunja "truth". However, long-stemmed nouns in -jō have a different nominative singular ending in -i:

Case	bandi, bandjōs band f.			
Case	Singular		Plural	
Nominative (+ vocative)	bandi	–i	bandjōs	–jōs
Accusative	bandja	–ja	bandjōs	–jōs
Genitive	bandjōs	–jōs	bandjō	–jō
Dative	bandjái	–jái	bandjōm	–jōm

Note that in this particular case the "long-stem" declension includes nouns with a long vowel or diphthong and no following consonant. In addition, these nouns have a different stem in the nominative singular from all other cases:

- mawi (genitive máujōs) "maiden"
- þiwi (genitive þiujōs) "maidservant"

=== The -i declension ===
This declension counterparts the vowel stems of the third declension (is) of Latin, and the third declension of Greek. It contains masculine and feminine nouns. Note that masculine nouns have become identical to -a stem nouns in the singular, while feminine nouns have preserved the original declension.

Case	gasts, gasteis stranger, guest m.				qēns, qēneis wife f.			
Case	Singular		Plural		Singular		Plural	
Nominative (+ vocative plural)	gasts	–s	gasteis	–eis	qēns	–s	qēneis	–eis
Accusative (+ vocative singular)	gast	–	gastins	–ins	qēn	–	qēnins	–ins
Genitive	gastis	–is	gastē	–ē	qēnáis	–áis	qēnē	–ē
Dative	gasta	–a	gastim	–im	qēnái	–ái	qēnim	–im

Similar to the situation with -a stems, some nouns have a different stem in the nominative and accusative singular than in other cases:

- drus (acc. drus, gen. drusis) "fall", masc.
- baúr (acc. baúr, gen. baúris) "child, son", masc.
- náus (acc. náu, gen. nawis) "corpse", masc.
- brūþfaþs (gen. brūþfadis) "bridegroom", masc.; similarly sáuþs "sacrifice", staþs "place"
- usstass (acc. usstass, gen. usstassáis) "resurrection", fem.
- arbáiþs (gen. arbáidáis) "labor", fem.; similarly dēþs "deed", fahēþs "joy"

Some additional complications:

- háims "village" (fem.) is declined like a feminine -i stem in the singular, but like an -ō stem in the plural.
- Feminine abstract -i stems in -eins are declined partly like -ō stems in the plural:

Case	láiseins, láiseinōs doctrine f.			
Case	Singular		Plural	
Nominative	láiseins	–s	láiseinōs	–ōs
Accusative	láisein	–	láiseinins	–ins
Genitive	láiseináis	–áis	láiseinō	–ō
Dative	láiseinái	–ái	láiseinim	–im

=== The -u declension ===
This declension counterparts the fourth declension (us) of Latin and parts of the third declension of Greek (cf. πῆχυς). It contains nouns of all genders. faíhu "property" is a neuter -u stem, and like all neuters from the u stem it lacks a plural. Other remnants are the invariant neuter adjective filu "much" (with an adverbial genitive filáus), and qaíru or gáiru "spike, goad", occurring once in a gloss. leiþu "cider, fruit wine" is attested only in the accusative singular and without any context to infer its gender, so it may have been masculine or neuter.

Case	sunus, sunjus son m.				faíhu property n.	
Case	Singular		Plural		Singular	
Nominative (+ vocative plural)	sunus	–us	sunjus	–jus	faíhu	–u
Accusative (+ vocative singular)	sunu	–u	sununs	–uns	faíhu	–u
Genitive	sunáus	–áus	suniwē	–iwē	faíháus	–áus
Dative	sunáu	–áu	sunum	–um	faíháu	–áu

== Weak noun declensions (n-stems) ==
The an, on and in declensions constitute a Germanic word derivation, which is also used for adjectives in the weak form marking definiteness. The declension loosely parallels the Latin nouns in -ō, genitive -ōnis/-inis, which shares the same Indo-European declensional origin (the Greek descendant being the more regularized -ōn, -onos class).

=== The -an declension ===
Masculines and neuters belong to this declension.

Case	guma, gumans man m.				haírtō, haírtōna heart n.			
Case	Singular		Plural		Singular		Plural	
Nominative (+ vocative)	guma	–a	gumans	–ans	haírtō	–ō	haírtōna	–ōna
Accusative	guman	–an	gumans	–ans	haírtō	–ō	haírtōna	–ōna
Genitive	gumins	–ins	gumanē	–anē	haírtins	–ins	haírtanē	–anē
Dative	gumin	–in	gumam	–am	haírtin	–in	haírtam	–am

There are a few neuter irregularities:

Case	watō, watna water n.				namō, namna name n.			
Case	Singular		Plural		Singular		Plural	
Nominative-Accusative (Vocative)	watō	–	watna	–na	namō	–	namna	–na
Genitive	watins	–ins	watnē	–nē	namins	–ins	namnē	–nē
Dative	watin	–in	watnam	–nam	namin	–in	namnam	–nam

=== The -ōn declension ===
This declension is the feminine counterpart of the an declension.

Case	tuggō, tuggōns tongue f.			
Case	Singular		Plural	
Nominative	tuggō	–ō	tuggōns	–ōns
Accusative	tuggōn	–ōn	tuggōns	–ōns
Genitive	tuggōns	–ōns	tuggōnō	–ōnō
Dative	tuggōn	–ōn	tuggōm	–ōm

Note: the first g in tuggō is pronounced [ŋ]. The Gothic language borrowed the practice of denoting [ŋɡ] by gg and [ŋk] by gk from the Koine Greek in which the New Testament was originally written.

=== The -ein declension ===
This declension contains abstract feminines only.

Case	frōdei, frōdeins wisdom f.			
Case	Singular		Plural	
Nominative	frōdei	–ei	frōdeins	–eins
Accusative	frōdein	–ein	frōdeins	–eins
Genitive	frōdeins	–eins	frōdeinō	–einō
Dative	frōdein	–ein	frōdeim	–eim

== Minor noun declensions ==
=== The -r declension ===
A few family nouns inherited from Proto-Indo-European have a very archaic declension. Feminines and masculines have identical forms.

Case	swistar, swistrjus sister f.			
Case	Singular		Plural	
Nominative	swistar	–ar	swistrjus	–rjus
Accusative	swistar	–ar	swistruns	–runs
Genitive	swistrs	–rs	swistrē	–rē
Dative	swistr	–r	swistrum	–rum

Inflected thus are also brōþar m., "brother", fadar m., "father", daúhtar f., "daughter".

=== The -nd declension ===
These nouns are old present participles, corresponding to nouns in -nt in Latin and Greek.

Case	frijōnds, frijōnds friend m.			
Case	Singular		Plural	
Nominative	frijōnds	–s	frijōnds	–s
Accusative	frijōnd	–	frijōnds	–s
Genitive	frijōndis	–is	frijōndē	–ē
Dative	frijōnd	–	frijōndam	–am

=== The root nouns ===
These nouns correspond to the consonant declensions in Latin and Greek (in both cases, part of the third declension). Only traces of masculines are extant, but feminines are fairly well attested.

Case	reiks, reiks ruler m.				baúrgs, baúrgs city f.			
Case	Singular		Plural		Singular		Plural	
Nominative	reiks	–s	reiks	–s	baúrgs	–s	baúrgs	–s
Acc.	reik	–	reiks	–s	baúrg	–	baúrgs	–s
Gen.	reikis	–is, –s	reikē	–ē	baúrgs	–s	baúrgē	–ē
Dative	reik	–	reikam	–am, um	baúrg	–	baúrgim	–im

The only masculine nouns extant are mēnōþs "month" (gen. sg. mēnōþs or ?mēnōþis, dat. pl. mēnōþum); reiks "ruler" (gen. sg. reikis, dat. pl. reikam); and weitwōds "witness" (gen. sg., dat. pl. not attested).

There are nine feminine nouns attested. Note the following irregularities:

- mitaþs "measure" (gen. sg. mitads)
- nahts "night" (dat. pl. nahtam, formed after dat. pl. dagam "days")
- dulþs "feast" and waíhts "thing", also declined as i-stems.

The other five feminine nouns are alhs "temple", baúrgs "city", brusts "breast", miluks "milk", and spaúrds "racecourse".

== Adjectives ==
Adjectives in Gothic, as in the other Germanic languages, can be declined according to two different paradigms, commonly called "strong" and "weak". This represents a significant innovation in Germanic, although a similar development has taken place in the Baltic and Slavic languages.

Adjectives in Proto-Indo-European -- as is still the case in Latin, Greek, and most other daughters—are declined in exactly the same way as nouns. Germanic "strong" adjectives, however, take many of their endings from the declension of pronouns. These pronominal endings are likely to have entered the adjective inflection in the Germanic proto-language, via the inflection of possessive adjectives and other "pronominal" word classes, as evidenced by the variation between the bare stem and -ata in the neuter nominative and accusative singular of Gothic adjectives and possessive pronouns. "Weak" adjectives take the endings of -n stem nouns, regardless of the underlying stem class of the adjective.

In general, weak adjectival endings are used when the adjective is accompanied by a definite article, and strong endings are used in other situations. However, weak endings are occasionally used in the absence of a definite article, and cause the associated noun to have the same semantics as if a definite article were present. Weak adjectives are also used when the associated noun is in the vocative case. In addition, some adjectives are always declined weak or strong, regardless of any accompanying articles.

=== The strong -a declension ===
Case	blinds, blind/blindata, blinda blind											
Case	Singular						Plural					
Case	Masculine		Neuter		Feminine		Masculine		Neuter		Feminine	
Nominative	blinds	–s	blind(ata)	–(ata)	blinda	–a	blindái	–ái	blinda	–a	blindōs	–ōs
Accusative	blindana	–ana	blind(ata)	–(ata)	blinda	–a	blindans	–ans	blinda	–a	blindōs	–ōs
Genitive	blindis	–is	blindis	–is	blindáizōs	–áizōs	blindáizē	–áizē	blindáizē	–áizē	blindáizō	–áizō
Dative	blindamma	–amma	blindamma	–amma	blindái	–ái	blindáim	–áim	blindáim	–áim	blindáim	–áim

=== The strong -ja declension ===
Similar to the situation with nouns, the ja-stem adjectives are divided into two subtypes, depending on whether the stem is short or long.

==== Short-stemmed -ja declension ====
Case	midjis, midi/midjata, midja middle											
Case	Singular						Plural					
Case	Masculine		Neuter		Feminine		Masculine		Neuter		Feminine	
Nominative	midjis	–jis	midi, midjata	–i, –jata	midja	–ja	midjái	–jái	midja	–ja	midjōs	–jōs
Accusative	midjana	–jana	midi, midjata	–i, –jata	midja	–ja	midjans	–jans	midja	–ja	midjōs	–jōs
Genitive	midjis	–jis	midjis	–jis	midjáizōs	–jáizōs	midjáizē	–jáizē	midjáizē	–jáizē	midjáizō	–jáizō
Dative	midjamma	–jamma	midjamma	–jamma	midjái	–jái	midjáim	–jáim	midjáim	–jáim	midjáim	–jáim

This declension has only the following extant adjectives: aljis "other", freis "free" (stem frij-, see below), fullatōjis "perfect", gawiljis "willing", midjis "middle", niujis "new", sunjis "true", ubiltōjis "evil-doing", and unsibjis "lawless". Notes about the above adjectives:

- freis "free" has the stem frij- outside of the nominative masculine singular and presumably also the short-form nominative and accusative neuter singular and genitive masculine and neuter singular, although apparently it is unattested in those forms.
- fullatōjis "perfect" and ubiltōjis "evil-doing" should end in –taui in the short-form nominative and accusative neuter singular, although apparently it is unattested in those forms.
- Similarly, niujis "new" should have niwi as its short-form nominative and accusative neuter singular, although apparently it is unattested in those forms.

==== Long-stemmed –ja declension ====
Case	wilþeis, wilþi/wilþjata, wilþi wild											
Case	Singular						Plural					
Case	Masculine		Neuter		Feminine		Masculine		Neuter		Feminine	
Nominative	wilþeis	–eis	wilþi, wilþjata	–i, –jata	wilþi	–i	wilþjái	–jái	wilþja	–ja	wilþjōs	–jōs
Accusative	wilþjana	–jana	wilþi, wilþjata	–i, –jata	wilþja	–ja	wilþjans	–jans	wilþja	–ja	wilþjōs	–jōs
Genitive	wilþeis	–eis	wilþeis (or -jis?)	–eis (–jis?)	wilþjáizōs	–jáizōs	wilþjáizē	–jáizē	wilþjáizē	–jáizē	wilþjáizō	–jáizō
Dative	wilþjamma	–jamma	wilþjamma	–jamma	wilþjái	–jái	wilþjáim	–jáim	wilþjáim	–jáim	wilþjáim	–jáim

This declension is built out of long-stemmed -ja masculine and neuter nouns and long-stemmed -jō feminine nouns.

This declension has only five extant adjectives: aírzeis "astray", alþeis "old", faírneis "old", wilþeis "wild", and wōþeis "sweet". None of these adjectives are extent in any genitive singular forms, and hence the forms given above are reconstructions based on the behavior of the corresponding nouns. The hesitation between wilþeis or wilþjis as the neuter genitive singular form stems from the following facts:

- The –eis ending is the phonologically expected ending, and masculines genitive singulars use this ending.
- Neuter genitive singulars of long-stem nouns, on the other hand, generally use –jis, by analogy with short-stem neuter nouns.
- However, some long-stem neuter nouns use both the (phonologically regular) –eis and the (analogically replaced) –jis, as in genitive andbahteis or andbahtjis "of service", gawaírþeis or gawaírþjis "of peace".
- Given that masculine and neuter adjectives have the same genitive and dative forms in all other types of adjectives, the influence of the masculine on the neuter is expected to be very strong. This is why the most likely form is assumed to be the one in –eis, despite the impact of the corresponding neuter nouns.

=== The strong -i declension ===
Adjectives of this class have replaced most forms with forms taken from the -ja declension. Only the nominative singular, the neuter accusative singular and the masculine and neuter genitive singular have genuine -i stem forms.

Case	hráins, hráin, hráins clean											
Case	Singular						Plural					
Case	Masculine		Neuter		Feminine		Masculine		Neuter		Feminine	
Nominative	hráins	–s	hráin	–	hráins	–s	hráinjái	–jái	hráinja	–ja	hráinjōs	–jōs
Accusative	hráinjana	–jana	hráin	–	hráinja	–ja	hráinjans	–jans	hráinja	–ja	hráinjōs	–jōs
Genitive	hráinis	–is	hráinis	–is	*hráinjáizōs	*–jáizōs	hráinjáizē	–jáizē	hráinjáizē	–jáizē	hráinjáizō	–jáizō
Dative	hráinjamma	–jamma	hráinjamma	–jamma	hráinjái	–jái	hráinjáim	–jáim	hráinjáim	–jáim	hráinjáim	–jáim

The following adjectives of this type are extant (along with a few others): analáugns "hidden", anasiuns "visible", andanēms "pleasant", áuþs "desert", brūks "useful", gafáurs "well-behaved", gamáins "common", hráins "clean", sēls "kind", skáuns "beautiful", skeirs "clear", suts (?sūts) "sweet".

=== The strong -u declension ===
Similarly to -i stem adjectives, -u stem adjectives have replaced most forms with those taken from the -ja declension.

Case	hardus, hardu/hardjata, hardus hard											
Case	Singular						Plural					
Case	Masculine		Neuter		Feminine		Masculine		Neuter		Feminine	
Nominative	hardus	–us	hardu, hardjata	–u, –jata	hardus	–us	hardjái	–jái	*hardja	*–ja	hardjōs	–jōs
Accusative	hardjana	–jana	hardu, hardjata	–u, –jata	hardus	–us	hardjans	–jans	*hardja	*–ja	hardjōs	–jōs
Genitive	*hardáus	*–áus	*hardáus	*–áus	*hardjáizōs	*–jáizōs	hardjáizē	–jáizē	hardjáizē	–jáizē	hardjáizō	–jáizō
Dative	*hardjamma	*–jamma	*hardjamma	*–jamma	*hardjái	*–jái	hardjáim	–jáim	hardjáim	–jáim	hardjáim	–jáim

The following adjectives of this type are extant: aggwus "narrow", aglus "difficult", hardus "hard", hnasqus "soft", kaúrus "heavy", manwus "ready", qaírrus "gentle", seiþus "late", tulgus "steadfast", twalibwintrus "twelve years old", þaúrsus "withered", þlaqus "soft".

=== The weak declension ===
Weak adjectival endings are taken from the corresponding endings of masculine, feminine and neuter n-stems, e.g. masculine guma "man", feminine tuggō "tongue", neuter haírtō "heart". All adjectives have the same endings, regardless of the underlying stem class of the adjective. The only difference is that ja-stems, i-stems and u-stems have a -j- at the end of the stem, e.g. masculine singular nominative weak niuja "new", wilþja "wild", hráinja "clean", hardja "hard", corresponding to the strong forms niujis (short ja-stem), wilþeis (long ja-stem), hráins (i-stem), hardus (u-stem).

Case	blinda, blindō, blindō blind											
Case	Singular						Plural					
Case	Masculine		Neuter		Feminine		Masculine		Neuter		Feminine	
Nominative	blinda	–a	blindō	–ō	blindō	–ō	blindans	–ans	blindōna	–ōna	blindōns	–ōns
Accusative	blindan	–an	blindō	–ō	blindōn	–ōn	blindans	–ans	blindōna	–ōna	blindōns	–ōns
Genitive	blindins	–ins	blindins	–ins	blindōns	–ōns	blindanē	–anē	blindanē	–anē	blindōnō	–ōnō
Dative	blindin	–in	blindin	–in	blindōn	–ōn	blindam	–am	blindam	–am	blindōm	–ōm

== Pronouns ==
=== Personal pronouns ===
Gothic personal pronouns
Personal pronouns	1st person			2nd person			3rd Person						Reflexive
Personal pronouns	Singular	Dual	Plural	Singular	Dual	Plural	Masculine		Neuter		Feminine		Reflexive
Personal pronouns	Singular	Dual	Plural	Singular	Dual	Plural	Singular	Plural	Singular	Plural	Singular	Plural	Reflexive
Nominative	ik	wit	weis	þu	jut	jus	is	eis	ita	ija	si	ijōs	
Accusative	mik	ugkis	uns, unsis	þuk	igqis	izwis	ina	ins	ita	ija	ija	ijōs	sik
Genitive	meina	ugkara	unsara	þeina	igqara	izwara	is	izē	is	izē	izōs	izō	seina
Dative	mis	ugkis	unsis, uns	þus	igqis	izwis	imma	im	imma	im	izái	im	sis

=== Possessive pronouns ===
Gothic possessive personal pronouns
Possessive personal pronouns			Possessor			
Possessive personal pronouns			Nominative	Accusativ	Genitive	Dative
Possessee	Masculine	Singular	-s	-ana	-is	-amma
Possessee	Masculine	Plural	-ái	-ans	-áizē	-áim
Possessee	Neuter	Singular	-(ata)		-is	-amma
Possessee	Neuter	Plural	-a		-aizē	-áim
Possessee	Feminine	Singular	-a		-áizōs	-ái
Possessee	Feminine	Plural	-ōs		-ái	-áim

Gothic possessive pronouns are formed by adding the above shown suffixes to the genitive ("possessor") form of the given personal pronoun. Reflexive possessive pronouns are inflected similarly. The form used outside of possession is derived from the nominative feminine singular.

=== Demonstrative pronouns ===
Gothic demonstrative pronouns
Demonstrative pronouns	The/ This					
Demonstrative pronouns	Masculine		Neuter		Feminine	
Demonstrative pronouns	Singular	Plural	Singular	Plural	Singular	Plural
Nominative	sa	þái	þata	þō	sō	þōs
Accusative	þana	þans	þata	þō	þō	þōs
Genitive	þis	þizē	þis	þizē	þizōs	þizō
Dative	þamma	þáim	þamma	þáim	þizái	þáim

Compound forms with the suffix -(u)h meaning "this, these; that/ those" and with -ei creating relative pronouns also exist. The suffix -ei can also be added to first and second person pronouns to create first and second person relatives. All compound forms drop the "u" in -uh after a vowel and change word-final -s to a -z if the next letter is a vowel.

=== Interrogative pronouns ===
Gothic interrogative pronouns
Interrogative pronouns		Masculine		Neuter		Feminine	
Interrogative pronouns		Singular	Plural	Singular	Plural	Singular	Plural
What/ Who	Nominative	ƕas	*ƕái	ƕa	*ƕō	ƕō	*ƕōs
What/ Who	Accusative	ƕana	ƕans	ƕa	*ƕō	ƕō	*ƕōs
What/ Who	Genitive	ƕis	*ƕizē	ƕis	*ƕizē	*ƕizōs	*ƕizō
What/ Who	Dative	ƕamma	*ƕáim	ƕwamma	*ƕáim	ƕizái	*ƕáim
Which one (of two)	Nominative	ƕaþar	*ƕaþarái	ƕaþara(ta)	*ƕaþara	*ƕaþara	*ƕaþarōs
Which one (of two)	Accusative	*ƕaþarana	*ƕaþarans	ƕaþara(ta)	*ƕaþara	*ƕaþara	*ƕaþarōs
Which one (of two)	Genitive	*ƕaþaris	*ƕaþaráizē	*ƕaþaris	*ƕaþaráizē	*ƕaþaráizōs	*ƕaþaráizō
Which one (of two)	Dative	*ƕaþaramma	*ƕaþaráim	*ƕaþaramma	*ƕaþaráim	*ƕaþara	*ƕaþaráim
Which (of more than two)	Nominative	ƕarjis	ƕarjái	ƕarjata, ƕari	ƕarja	ƕarja	ƕarjōs
Which (of more than two)	Accusative	ƕarjana	ƕarjans	ƕarjata, ƕari	ƕarja	ƕarja	ƕarjōs
Which (of more than two)	Genitive	ƕarjis	ƕarjáizē	ƕarjis	ƕarjáizē	ƕarjáizōs	ƕarjáizē
Which (of more than two)	Dative	ƕarjamma	ƕarjáim	ƕarjamma	ƕarjamma	ƕarjái	ƕarjáim

The plural form *ƕans (masculine accusative) occurs once as part of the indefinite pronoun ƕanzuh "each, every"; the other plurals are reconstructed. Hwas is declined irregular, but shares similar forms with sa, the others are declined mostly like strong (j)a-stem adjectives. Hwaþar is only extant in the nominative masculine singular and neuter singular nominative/ accusative; the other forms are reconstructed.

The following additional pronouns exist, all declined strong as a-stems:

- ƕileiks "what sort of"
- ƕēláuþs (stem ƕēláud-) "how great"
- swaleiks "such"
- swaláuþs (stem swaláud-) "so great"

=== Indefinite pronouns ===
Three indefinite pronouns are formed by appending -uh "and" to the interrogative pronouns ƕas "who, what", ƕarjis "which (of many)", and ƕaþar "which of two"; compare the analogously formed Latin pronoun quisque "each", formed from quis "who" and -que "and". Both ƕazuh and ƕarjizuh mean "each, every"; *ƕaþaruh means "each of two".

Before -uh, -s appears in the original form of -z-, and after long vowels and stressed short vowels, the u of -uh is elided. Unstressed short vowels are dropped before -uh in the declension of ƕazuh; however, in the other two pronouns, long vowels appear in place of unstressed short vowels, preserving an older state of affairs, and the u of -uh is elided. Declension tables of ƕazuh and ƕarjizuh are presented below. Of *ƕaþaruh, only a single form is extant, the dative singular *ƕaþarammēh, occurring in the compound form áinƕaþarammēh "to each one of two".

The plural form ƕanzuh (masculine accusative) occurs once, in the expression insandida ins twans ƕanzuh "he sent them forth two and two".

Case	Indefinite #1: Each/Every		
Case	Singular		
Case	Masculine	Neuter	Feminine
Nominative	ƕazuh	ƕah	ƕōh
Accusative	ƕanuh	ƕah	ƕōh
Genitive	ƕizuh		ƕizōzuh
Dative	ƕammuh		ƕizáih

Case	Indefinite #2: Each/Every		
Case	Singular		
Case	Masculine	Neuter	Feminine
Nominative	ƕarjizuh	ƕarjatōh	ƕarjōh
Accusative	ƕarjanōh	ƕarjatōh	ƕarjōh
Genitive	ƕarjizuh		ƕarjizōzuh
Dative	ƕarjammēh		ƕarjáih

Additional pronominal forms are

- áinƕarjizuh "every one"
- ƕazuh saei, saƕazuh saei, saƕazuh izei, all meaning "whoever" and involving the relative pronoun saei/izei. The corresponding neuter form is þataƕah þei "whatever", extant only in the accusative singular.
- þisƕazuh saei "whoever/whatever", formed from indeclinable þis "of this" and ƕazuh saei, extant in the following forms:

Case	þisƕazuh saei "Whoever/Whatever"	
Case	Singular	
Case	Masculine	Neuter
Nominative	þisƕazuh saei	þisƕah þei, þisƕah þatei
Accusative	þisƕanōh saei	þisƕah þei, þisƕah þatei
Genitive	?	þisƕizuh þei
Dative	þisƕammēh saei	þisƕammēh þei

- sums "some, a certain", declined as an -a stem with an associated genitive plural object.
- sums ... sums "the one ... the other", in plural "some ... and others". -uh is generally attached to the second form and sometimes the first, as in nominative plural sumái(h) ... sumáih.
- Negative pronouns ni ƕashun, ni mannahun, ni áinshun, all meaning "no one, no, none, nothing"; compare the analogously formed Sanskrit pronoun ná káś caná "no one, none", lit. "not who and not". Ni ƕashun occurs only in the nominative masculine singular. Ni mannahun (always masculine) and ni áinshun are declined as follows:

Case	ni mannahun "No one"
Case	Singular
Case	Masculine
Nominative	ni mannahun
Accusative	ni mannanhun
Genitive	ni manshun
Dative	ni mannhun

Case	ni áinshun "No one, no, none, nothing"		
Case	Singular		
Case	Masculine	Neuter	Feminine
Nominative	ni áinshun	ni áinhun	ni áinōhun
Accusative	ni áinnōhun, ni áinōhun	ni áinhun	ni áinōhun
Genitive	ni áinishun	ni áinishun	*ni áináizōshun
Dative	ni áinummēhun	ni áinummēhun	ni áináihun

- Plain ƕas can be used indefinitely to mean "anyone, anything".
- Plain áins can be used indefinitely to mean "one, a certain one".

== Numbers ==
Gothic numbers
#	Cardinal		Ordinal	
#	Word	Declension	Word	Declension
1	áins	strong singular a-stem	fruma	irregular
1	áins	strong singular a-stem	frumists	strong a-stem
2	twái	irregular	anþar	irregular
3	þreis	irregular	þridja	Weak a-stem
4	fidwōr	undeclined or i-stem	*fidurþa	Weak a-stem
5	fimf	undeclined or i-stem	fimfta	Weak a-stem
6	saíhs	undeclined or i-stem	saíhsta	Weak a-stem
7	sibun	undeclined or i-stem	*sibunda	Weak a-stem
8	ahtáu	undeclined or i-stem	ahtuda	Weak a-stem
9	niun	undeclined or i-stem	niunda	Weak a-stem
10	taíhun	undeclined or i-stem	taíhunda	Weak a-stem
11	áinlif	undeclined or i-stem	*ainlifta	Weak a-stem
12	twalif	undeclined or i-stem	*twalifta	Weak a-stem
13	*þreitaíhun	undeclined or i-stem	*þreitaíhunda	Weak a-stem
14	fidwōrtaíhun	undeclined or i-stem	*fidurþataíhunda	Weak a-stem
15	fimftaíhun	undeclined or i-stem	fimtataíhunda	Weak a-stem
16	saíhstaíhun	undeclined or i-stem	*saíhstataíhunda	Weak a-stem
17	sibuntaíhun	undeclined or i-stem	*sibundataíhunda	Weak a-stem
18	ahtáutaíhun	undeclined or i-stem	*ahtudataíhunda	Weak a-stem
19	niuntaíhun	undeclined or i-stem	*niundataíhunda	Weak a-stem
20	twái tigjus	tigjus is a plural masculine u-stem; multiplier agrees in case		Weak a-stem
30	þreis tigjus	tigjus is a plural masculine u-stem; multiplier agrees in case		Weak a-stem
40	fedwōr tigjus	tigjus is a plural masculine u-stem; multiplier agrees in case		Weak a-stem
50	fimf tigjus	tigjus is a plural masculine u-stem; multiplier agrees in case		Weak a-stem
60	saihs tigjus	tigjus is a plural masculine u-stem; multiplier agrees in case		Weak a-stem
70	sibuntēhund	undeclined or uncertain declension		Weak a-stem
80	ahtáutēhund	undeclined or uncertain declension		Weak a-stem
90	niuntēhund	undeclined or uncertain declension		Weak a-stem
100	taíhuntēhund	undeclined or uncertain declension		Weak a-stem
100, 120	hund	neuter a-stem		Weak a-stem
(#) x 100 (or x 120)	(#) hund	multiplier agrees in case + hund		Weak a-stem
1000, 1200	þūsundi	feminine jō-stem		Weak a-stem
(#) x 1000 (or x 1200)	(#) þūsundi	multiplier agrees in case + þūsundi		Weak a-stem

Hund and þūsundi can mean either "100" and "1000" or "120" and "1200", depending on scale. Táihuntēhund always means "100". Áins has two different ordinals.

Numbers below 20 behave as adjectives, whereas those starting at 20 behave as nouns and govern the genitive case of an associated object, e.g. dagē fidwōr tiguns "for forty days", fimf þūsundjōs waírē "five thousand men", miþ twáim tigum þūsundjō mannē "with twenty thousand men". Ordinal numbers are always adjectives.

Plural forms of áins meaning "some" also occur, otherwise the numbers are always declined as plural.

Higher numbers from fidwōr "four" through niuntaíhun "nineteen" are normally undeclined, but can be declined as -i stems, e.g. dative fidwōrim, genitive *fidwōrē.

Decades sibuntēhund "seventy", ahtáutēhund "eighty", niuntēhund "ninety" and taíhuntēhund/taíhuntaíhund "one hundred" are normally undeclined, but genitive niuntēhundis "of ninety" occurs.

A handful of numerals are declined irregularly, shown below:

Gothic irregular numeral declension
Numeral declension		Masculine		Neuter		Feminine	
Numeral declension		Singular	Plural	Singular	Plural	Singular	Plural
Fruma/ Frumō/ Frumei, "1st"	Nominative	fruma	frumans	frumō	frumōna	frumei	frumeins
Fruma/ Frumō/ Frumei, "1st"	Accusative	fruman	frumans	frumō	frumōna	frumein	frumeins
Fruma/ Frumō/ Frumei, "1st"	Genitive	frumins	frumanē	frumins	frumanē	frumeins	frumeinō
Fruma/ Frumō/ Frumei, "1st"	Dative	frumin	frumam	frumin	frumam	frumein	frumeim
Twái/ Twa/ Twōs "2"	Nominative	twái		twa		twōs	
Twái/ Twa/ Twōs "2"	Accusative	twans		twa		twōs	
Twái/ Twa/ Twōs "2"	Genitive	twaddjē		twaddjē		*twaddjō	
Twái/ Twa/ Twōs "2"	Dative	twáim		twáim		twáim	
Anþar/ Anþar/ Anþara "2nd"	Nominative	anþar	anþarái	anþar	anþara	anþara	anþarōs
Anþar/ Anþar/ Anþara "2nd"	Accusative	anþarana	anþarans	anþar	anþara	anþara	anþarōs
Anþar/ Anþar/ Anþara "2nd"	Genitive	anþaris	anþaráizē	anþaris	anþaráizē	anþaráizōs	anþaráizō
Anþar/ Anþar/ Anþara "2nd"	Dative	anþaramma	anþaráim	anþaramma	anþaráim	anþarái	anþaráim
Þreis/ Þrija/ Þreis "3"	Nominative	þreis		þrija		þreis	
Þreis/ Þrija/ Þreis "3"	Accusative	þrins		þrija		þrins	
Þreis/ Þrija/ Þreis "3"	Genitive	þrijē		þrijē		*þrijō	
Þreis/ Þrija/ Þreis "3"	Dative	þrim		þrim		þrim	

Notes:

- twái and þreis are declined entirely irregularly.
- fruma is declined weak like blinda "blind" except that the feminine is declined according to the ei-stems like managei "multitude", e.g. feminine nominative frumei.
- anþar has nominative masculine and neuter anþar (no -ata form exists), and otherwise is declined a strong a-stem.

=== Other numerals ===
"Both" is bái or bajōþs, of which the following forms are extant:

Case	bái/ba/*bōs two		
Case	Masculine	Neuter	Feminine
Nominative	bái, bajōþs	ba	*bōs
Accusative	bans	ba	*bōs
Genitive	*baddjē		*baddjō
Dative	báim, bajōþum		

The extant forms of bái match the corresponding forms of twái "two", and evidence from other Germanic languages, e.g. Old English, indicates that all forms are constructed in this fashion.

Distributive numerals answer the question "how many at a time?". The isolated form tweihnái "two each" exists, declined as a plural strong adjective. Otherwise, distributive numerals are expressed using prepositional phrases, e.g. bi twans aíþþáu máist þrins "by twos or at most by threes"; ana ƕarjanōh fimftiguns "by fifties in each (company)"; insandida ins twans ƕanzuh "he sent them forth two and two".

Multiplicative numerals answer the question "how many times more?" and are formed by adding the adjectival stem -falþs to the stem of the corresponding cardinal. Extant are áinfalþs "onefold, simple"; fidurfalþs "fourfold" (note, not *fidwōrfalþs); taíhuntaíhundfalþs "hundredfold"; managfalþs "manifold".

Numeral adverbs answer the question "how often?" or "how many times?". They are formed by combining the cardinal or ordinal with the noun *sinþs "time" (lit. "a going"), and placing the result in the dative case: áinamma sinþa "once"; anþaramma sinþa "a second time"; twáim sinþam "twice"; þrim sinþam "thrice"; fimf sinþam "five times"; sibun sinþam "seven times". Compare Old English ǣne sīða "once", fīf sīða "five times".

== See also ==
- Gothic language
- Grammar of the Gothic Language
- Proto-Indo-European noun:
  - Ancient Greek grammar
  - Latin declension
  - Sanskrit nouns
