= Hindustani declension =

Declensions in Hindi and Urdu

Hindi-Urdu, also known as Hindustani, has three noun cases (nominative, oblique, and vocative) and five pronoun cases (nominative, accusative, dative, genitive, and oblique). The oblique case in pronouns has three subdivisions: Regular, Ergative, and Genitive. There are eight case-marking postpositions in Hindi and out of those eight the ones which end in the vowel -ā (the semblative and the genitive postpositions) also decline according to number, gender, and case.

== Nouns ==
All the case declension paradigms for nouns are shown below.

Case				Nominative	Oblique	Vocative
Masculine	ending in -ā	Boy	Singular	लड़का لڑکا laṛkā	लड़के لڑکے laṛke	
Masculine	ending in -ā	Boy	Plural	लड़के لڑکے laṛke	लड़कों لڑکوں laṛkõ	लड़को لڑکو laṛko
Masculine	ending in -∅	Tree	Singular	पेड़ پیڑ peṛ		
Masculine	ending in -∅	Tree	Plural	पेड़ پیڑ peṛ	पेड़ों پیڑوں peṛõ	पेड़ो پیڑو peṛo
Feminine	ending in -i/ī	Girl	Singular	लड़की لڑکی laṛkī		
Feminine	ending in -i/ī	Girl	Plural	लड़कियाँ لڑکیاں laṛkiyā̃	लड़कियों لڑکیوں laṛkiyõ	लड़कियो لڑکیو laṛkiyo
Feminine	ending in -∅	Train	Singular	ट्रेन ٹرین ṭren		
Feminine	ending in -∅	Train	Plural	ट्रेनें ٹرینیں ṭrenẽ	ट्रेनों ٹرینوں ṭrenõ	ट्रेनो ٹرینو ṭreno

Some masculine words ending in -ā (like pitā and kartā) retain 'ā' throughout their declension, only adding endings -õ and -o in oblique plural and vocative plural respectively.

== Pronouns ==
The declension of all the pronouns of Hindi-Urdu are mentioned in the table below:

=== Personal Pronouns ===
Case			Personal				
Case			1st person		2nd person		
Case			Singular	Plural	Singular	Plural	
Case			Singular	Plural	Intimate	Familiar	Formal
Nominative			मैं میں ma͠i	हम ہم ham	तू تو tū	तुम تم tum	आप آپ āp
Dative			मुझे مجھے mujhe	हमें ہمیں hamẽ	तुझे تجھے tujhe	तुम्हें تمہیں/تمھیں tumhẽ	—
Accusative			मुझे مجھے mujhe	हमें ہمیں hamẽ	तुझे تجھے tujhe	तुम्हें تمہیں/تمھیں tumhẽ	—
Oblique	Regular		मुझ مجھ mujh	हम ہم ham	तुझ تجھ tujh	तुम ہم tum	आप آپ āp
Oblique	Ergative		मैं میں ma͠i	हम ہم ham	तू تو tū	तुम ہم tum	आप آپ āp
Oblique	Emphatic		मुझी مجھی mujhī	हमीं ہمیں hamī̃	तुझी تجھی tujhī	तुम्हीं تمہیں/تمھیں tumhī̃	—
Oblique	Genitive	♂	मेरे میرے mere	हमारे ہمارے hamāre	तेरे تیرے tere	तुम्हारे تمہارے/تمھارے tumhāre	—
Oblique	Genitive	♀	मेरी میری merī	हमारी ہماری hamārī	तेरी تیری terī	तुम्हारी تمہاری/تمھاری tumhārī	—

=== Demonstrative, Relative, Interrogative Pronouns ===
Case		3rd person											
Case		Demonstrative						Relative			Interrogative		
Case		Proximal			Non-proximal			Singular	Plural	Formal	Singular	Plural	Formal
Case		Singular	Plural	Formal	Singular	Plural	Formal	Singular	Plural	Formal	Singular	Plural	Formal
Nominative	Written/Read	यह یہ yah	ये یے ye		वह وہ vah	वे وے ve^{1}		जो جو jo			कौन, क्या کَون، کیا kaun, kyā		
Nominative	Said colloquially	ये یے ye			वो وو vo			जो جو jo			कौन, क्या کَون، کیا kaun, kyā		
Dative		इसे اِسے ise	इन्हें اِنہیں/اِنھیں inhẽ		उसे اُسے use	उन्हें اُنہیں/اُنھیں unhẽ		जिसे جسے jise	जिन्हें جنھیں/جنہیں jinhẽ		किसे کیسے kise	किन्हें کنھیں/کنہیں kinhẽ	
Accusative		इसे اِسے ise	इन्हें اِنہیں/اِنھیں inhẽ		उसे اُسے use	उन्हें اُنہیں/اُنھیں unhẽ		जिसे جسے jise	जिन्हें جنھیں/جنہیں jinhẽ		किसे کیسے kise	किन्हें کنھیں/کنہیں kinhẽ	
Oblique	Regular	इस اِس is	इन اِن in		उस اُس us	उन اُن un		जिस جس jis	जिन جن jin		किस کس kis	किन کن kin	
Oblique	Ergative	इस اِس is	इन्हों اِنہوں/اِنھوں inhõ		उस اُس us	उन्हों اُنہوں/اُنھوں unhõ		जिस جس jis	जिन्हों جنہوں/جنھوں jinhõ		किस کس kis	किन्हों کنہوں/کنھوں kinhõ	
Oblique	Emphatic	इसी اِسی isī	इन्हीं اِنہیں/اِنھیں inhī̃		उसी اُسی usī	उन्हीं اُنہیں/اُنھیں unhī̃		—	—		किसी کسی kisī	किन्हीं کنہیں/کنھیں kinhī̃	

^{1} Rarely used in Urdu.

=== Possessive Pronouns ===
Pronoun		Masculine						Feminine					
Pronoun		Nominative			Oblique/Vocative			Nominative			Oblique/Vocative		
Pronoun		Singular	Plural	Formal	Singular	Plural	Formal	Singular	Plural	Formal	Singular	Plural	Formal
1st Person	Singular	मेरा میرا (merā)	मेरे میرے (mere)					मेरी میری (merī)					
1st Person	Plural	हमारा ہمارا (hamārā)	हमारे ہمارے (hamāre)					हमारी ہماری (hamārī)					
2nd Person	Intimate	तेरा تیرا (terā)	तेरे تیرے (tere)					तेरी تیری (terī)					
2nd Person	Familiar	तुम्हारा تمہارا/تمھارا (tumhārā)	तुम्हारे تمہارے/تمھارے (tumhāre)					तुम्हारी تمہاری/تمھاری (tumhārī)					

Note: The formal 2nd person pronoun आप آپ (āp) does not have possessive pronoun forms, instead the genitive postposition का کا (kā) is used with the oblique case to form the possessive pronoun.

== Postpositions ==
The case-marking postpositions of Hindi-Urdu are mentioned in the table below on the left, and the declensions of the genitive and semblative postpositions are on the right:

Case-markers
Case	Case Marker	Example	English	Example	English
Ergative	ने نے ne	लड़के ने لڑکے نے laṛke ne	boy	उन्होंने انہوں نے unhõne	they
Accusative	को کو ko	लड़के को لڑکے کو laṛke ko	the boy	उनको ان کو unko/un ko	them
Dative	को کو ko	लड़के को لڑکے کو laṛke ko	to the boy	उनको ان کو unko/un ko	to them
Instrumental	से سے se	लड़के से لڑکے سے laṛke se	with the boy	उनसे ان سے unse/un se	with them
Ablative	से سے se	लड़के से لڑکے سے laṛke se	from the boy	उनसे ان سے unse/un se	from them
Genitive	का کا kā	लड़के का لڑکے کا laṛke kā	boy's	उनका ان کا unkā/un kā	their(s)
Inessive	में میں mẽ	लड़के में لڑکے میں laṛke mẽ	in the boy	उनमें ان میں unmẽ/un mẽ	in them
Adessive	पे/पर پے/پہ / پر pe/par	लड़के पे لڑکے پہ laṛke pe	on the boy	उनपे ان پے unpe/un pe	on them
Terminative	तक تک tak	लड़के तक لڑکے تک laṛke tak	till the boy	उनतक ان تک untak/un tak	til them
Semblative	सा سا sā	लड़के सा لڑکے سا laṛke sā	boyish	उनसा ان سا unsā/un sā	like them

Case	Genitive Postposition						Semblative Postposition					
Case	Masculine			Feminine			Masculine			Feminine		
Case	Singular	Plural	Formal	Singular	Plural	Formal	Singular	Plural	Formal	Singular	Plural	Formal
Nominative	का کا kā	के کے ke		की کی kī			सा سا sā	से سے se		सी سی sī		
Oblique	के کے ke			की کی kī			से سے se			सी سی sī		
Vocative	के کے ke			की کی kī			से سے se			सी سی sī		

== Verbs ==
In the table below, ♦ represents the verbal root and suffixes are added to the verb roots to construct different participles and other verbal forms.

ASPECTUAL PARTICIPLES
Participles				Example bolnā / बोलना بولنا / to say	
		Singular	Plural	Singular	Plural
Habitual	♂	♦-tā	♦-tē	बोलता بولتا boltā	बोलते بولتے boltē
Habitual	♀	♦-tī	♦-tī̃	बोलती بولتی boltī	बोलतीं بولتیں boltī̃
Habitual Adjectival	♂	♦-tā huā	♦-tē huē	बोलता हुआ بولتا ہوا boltā huā	बोलते हुए بولتے ہوئے boltē huē
Habitual Adjectival	♀	♦-tī huī	♦-tī huī̃	बोलती हुई بولتی ہوی boltī huī	बोलती हुईं بولتی ہوئیں boltī huī̃
Perfective	♂	♦-(y)ā	♦-(y)ē	बोला بولا bolā	बोले بولے bolē
Perfective	♀	♦-(y)ī	♦-(y)ī̃	बोली بولی bolī	बोलीं بولیں bolī̃
Perfective Adjectival	♂	♦-(y)ā huā	♦-(y)ē huē	बोला हुआ بولا ہوا bolā huā	बोले हुए بولے ہوۓ bolē huē
Perfective Adjectival	♀	♦-(y)ī huī	♦-(y)ī huī̃	बोली हुई بولی ہوئ bolī huī	बोली हुईं بولی ہوئیں bolī huī̃

NON-ASPECTUAL PARTICIPLES
Participles				Example bolnā / बोलना بولنا / to say			
		Singular	Plural	Singular	Plural	Singular	Plural
Infinitive	♂	♦-nā	♦-nē	बोलना بولنا bolnā		बोलने بولنے bolnē	
Infinitive	♀	♦-nī	♦-nī̃	बोलनी بولنی bolnī		बोलनीं بولنیں bolnī̃	
Prospective & Agentive	♂	♦-nēvālā	♦-nēvālē	बोलनेवाला بولنے والا bolnēvālā		बोलनेवाले بولنے والے bolnēvālē	
Prospective & Agentive	♀	♦-nēvālī	♦-nēvālī̃	बोलनेवाली بولنے والی bolnēvālī		बोलनेवालीं بولنے والیں bolnēvālī̃	
Oblique Infinitive		♦-nē		बोलने بولنے bolnē			
Conjunctive		♦-kē, ♦-kar		बोलके, बोलकर بول کے، بول کر bolkē, bolkar			
Progressive		♦-tē-♦-tē		बोलते-बोलते بولتے بولتے boltē-boltē			

== See also ==
- Hindustani grammar
- Hindustani phonology
- Hindustani etymology
- Hindustani orthography
