= William Lawrence Banks =

British banker and horticulturalist

- Born: 1938
- Died: 2022 (aged 83–84)

William Lawrence Banks CBE DL VMH was vice president of the Royal Horticultural Society from 1992 until 2022.

== Early life and education ==
Banks was the son of Lillian Jean (née Walker) and Richard Alford Banks, born in 1938. They lived in the family estate of Hergest Croft gardens in Herefordshire. After studying at the University of Oxford he undertook National Service in the Navy.

== Career ==
He was employed as a merchant banker from 1961 until 1998. He held several roles within the Royal Horticultural Society from 1975 until his death in 2022. He was a treasurer in the 1980s and a vice president from 1992 to 2022. He was chair of the International Dendrology Society (1998–2003).

== Honours and awards ==
He was awarded the Victoria Medal of Honour in 1987 by the Royal Horticultural Society and made CBE in 1998 for services to medical education and clinical research. He had been Chair of the Council of the Royal Postgraduate Medical School.

== Personal life ==
In 1963 he was married to landscape architect Elizabeth Christina Saunders, who served as president of the Royal Horticultural Society from 2010 to 2013. They had two children together. He died at home in Herefordshire 14 June 2022.
