= Elizabeth Banks (architect) =

British landscape architect

Elizabeth Banks CBE (born 1941), is a retired British landscape architect specializing in the restoration of historic landscapes who was the first woman and professional horticulturalist to be president of the Royal Horticultural Society from 2010 to 2013. She was appointed a CBE for services to horticulture in 2017.

== Royal Horticultural Society ==
After starting her business in 1987, Banks designed Rosemoor Gardens for the RHS. Over several years she also designed six gardens installed at the Chelsea Flower Show and was awarded a Gold medal for five of them. Banks served as president of the Royal Horticultural Society from 2010 to 2013. She was the first professional horticulturalist to hold this position. She succeeded Giles Coode-Adams, who had held the position from 2008–2010.

== Hergest Croft Gardens ==
Banks and her husband, Lawrence, managed Hergest Croft Gardens from 1988–2010, when their younger son, Edward, took over. During this time, they designed and planted the Maple Grove, as well as other exotic trees. They moved to live at Ridgebourne, in Herefordshire.
