= WBOW (disambiguation) =

WBOW is a radio station (102.7 FM) licensed to serve Terre Haute, Indiana, United States, which held the WBOW-FM callsign from 2003 to 2012 and has held the WBOW callsign since 2017.

WBOW may also refer to:

- WBOW (1230 AM), a defunct radio station (1230 AM) formerly licensed to serve Terre Haute, Indiana, which held the call sign WBOW from 1927 to 1993
- WBOW (640 AM), a defunct radio station (640 AM) formerly licensed to serve Terre Haute, Indiana, which operated from 1993 to 2001
- WZZQ (FM), a defunct radio station (107.5 FM) formerly licensed to serve Terre Haute, Indiana, which held the call sign WBOW-FM 1968 to 1971, and again from 1971 to 1974
- WIBQ, a radio station (1300 AM) licensed to serve Terre Haute, Indiana, which held the call sign WBOW from 2002 to 2014
- WWVR (FM), a radio station (98.5 FM) licensed to serve Paris, Illinois, which held the call sign WBOW from 2014 to 2017
- WIBU, a defunct radio station (1440 AM) formerly licensed to serve Paris, Illinois, United States, which held the call sign WBOW in 2017
