= Third declension =

Declension paradigm in Indo-European

The third declension is a category of nouns in Latin and Greek with broadly similar case formation—diverse stems, but similar endings. Sanskrit also has a corresponding class (although not commonly termed as third), in which the so-called basic case endings are applied very regularly.

In contrast with the first- and second-declension endings, those of the third declension lack a theme vowel (a or o/u in the first and second declensions) and so are called athematic.

One distinguishing feature of third-declension nouns is a genitive singular ending of a short vowel and s: Latin rēg-is "of a king" Greek χειρ-ός (cheir-ós) "of a hand", and Sanskrit bhagavat-as "of the blessed (one)". Another is a dative singular ending of i (short i in Greek, long ī in Latin): rēg-ī "for a king"; χειρ-ί (cheir-í) "for, with the hand". This corresponds to an -e ending in Sanskrit, which might have been a contracted ai or lengthened i: bhagavat-e "for the blessed (one)"

Many third-declension nouns, unlike first- or second-declension nouns, show different stems depending on case and number—usually one stem for the nominative singular, and another for the rest of the cases, though some Greek nouns have three stems. Greek stems are often formed by ablaut: Latin homō "person" and homin-ēs "people"; Greek πατήρ (patēr’) "father", πατρ-ός (patr-ós) "of a father", and πατέρ-ες (patér-es), "fathers". In Sanskrit the situation is similar to that in Greek, but the strongest stem is used somewhat more.

A subcategory within both the Latin and Greek third declension is nouns with consonant stems. These, unlike all first- and second-declension nouns, end in a consonant. Often the consonant at the beginning of certain endings undergoes a sound change with the consonant of the stem: Latin rēx "king", from rēg-s (compare the earlier-mentioned rēgis); πούς (poús) "foot", and Attic dative plural ποσί (posí) "on foot" from πόδ-ς (pód-s) and ποδ-σί (pod-sí). These changes are subject to sandhi in Sanskrit.

== Greek third-declension nouns with vowel endings ==
Other Greek nouns whose stems in the earliest Greek (notably Mycenaean) ended in ι (i) or υ (u), and j (English consonantal y) or ϝ (digamma; English w) in e-grade, have in later Greek undergone sound changes that markedly distinguish them from run-of-the-mill third-declension nouns. In particular, the stems with j or ϝ lose this sound, and in some cases the preceding vowel is lengthened by compensatory lengthening. In Attic, if there is a short vowel adjacent in the ending, the two vowels switch their lengths by quantitative metathesis. Illustrative of the process is the development of the genitive singular of βασιλεύς (basileús), "king", πόλις (pólis), "city", and ἄστυ (ástu), "town":

early Greek *βασιλῆϝ-ος → Homeric βασιλῆος → Attic βασιλέως
early Greek *πόλεj-oς → Homeric πόληος → Attic πόλεως
early Greek *ϝάστηϝ-ος → *ἄστηος → Attic ἄστεως
*basilēw-os → basilēos → basiléōs
*póley-os → pólēos → póleōs
*wástēw-os → *ástēos → ásteōs

== See also ==
- Latin declension
- Ancient Greek nouns
