= WPFR =

WPFR may refer to:

- WPFR (AM), a radio station (1480 AM) licensed to serve Terre Haute, Indiana, United States
- WEHP (FM), a radio station (93.7 FM) licensed to serve Clinton, Indiana, which held the call signs WPFR from 1997 to 2000 and WPFR-FM from 2000 to 2023
- WIBQ, a radio station (1300 AM) licensed to serve Terre Haute, Indiana, which held the call sign WPFR from 1983 to 1987
- WBOW, a radio station (102.7 FM) licensed to serve Terre Haute, Indiana, which held the call sign WPFR from 1961 to 1992
- French Wikipedia
