= Quantitative metathesis =

Sound change affecting Greek vowel length

Quantitative metathesis (or transfer of quantity) is a specific form of metathesis or transposition (a sound change) involving quantity or vowel length. By this process, two vowels near each other – one long, one short – switch their lengths, so that the long one becomes short, and the short one becomes long.

In theory, the definition includes both

long-short → short-long

and

short-long → long-short,

but Ancient Greek, which the term was originally created to describe, displays only the former, since the process is part of long-vowel shortening.

== Ancient Greek ==
In the Attic and Ionic dialects of Ancient Greek, ēo and ēa often exchange length, becoming eō and eā.

This quantitative metathesis is more accurately described as one form of long-vowel shortening. Usually if quantitative metathesis affects a word, other kinds of shortening do as well, in the forms where quantitative metathesis cannot occur:

- ēwo → eō (quantitative metathesis)
- ēōs → eōs (shortening of long diphthong before consonant)
- ēi → ei (analogical shortening)

In general, the vowels affected by this shortening were separated by the Proto-Indo-European semivocalic versions of u or i, usually deleted in later Greek: w (written ϝ or υ̯ ) or y (written ι̯ ).

=== First declension ===
The Homeric form of the genitive singular in the masculine first declension sometimes undergoes quantitative metathesis:

- Πηλεΐδης Pēleḯdēs (patronym from Πηλεύς Pēleús: "Peleus-son", Achilles)

Πηλεΐδᾱο Pēleḯdāo → *Πηλεΐδηο *Pēleḯdēo → Πηλεΐδεω Pēleḯdeō (genitive singular; alternate form Πηληϊάδεω Pēlēïádeō in the first line of the Iliad)

The Attic genitive singular Πηλεΐδ-ου Pēleḯd-ou uses a copy of the second-declension ending, which came from the same original form as the ending -oio (used in Homer) — o-syo, thematic vowel o and case-ending -syo). The Homeric form comes from the same case ending, with the first-declension pseudo-thematic vowel ā.

=== Second declension ===
Nouns in a small subclass of the second declension (known as the "Attic declension") lengthen the o, oi of the ending to ō, ōi. Sometimes this is quantitative metathesis:

Ionic ληός lēós (from *λᾱϝός lāwós) → Attic λεώς leṓs "people"
ληοί lēoí → λεῴ leōí (nominative plural)

But sometimes, when a long vowel occurs in the ending, ē is shortened to e without an accompanying lengthening of the vowel in the ending (but ou changes to ō to follow the other forms):

ληοῦ lēoú → λεώ leṓ (genitive singular)
ληῷ lēōî → λεῴ leōí (dative singular)

=== Third declension ===
Some third-declension nouns had, in Proto-Indo-European, stems in -u or -i in zero-grade, -ew or -ey in short e-grade, and -ēw or -ēy in long ē-grade. Others had -āw with no variation in ablaut grade, which changed in some forms to ēw, by the Attic-Ionic ā → ē shift.

In many cases, the w or j was deleted, but sometimes it is preserved as the last element of a diphthong (-eus, -aus).

Stems with ē underwent shortening in Classical Attic-Ionic, but early forms with long ē are preserved in Homer to maintain the original meter. Some forms exemplify the quantitative-metathesis type of shortening:

- βασιλεύς basileús (shortened from *βασιλήϝς *basilḗws) "king"

Homeric (early Attic-Ionic) βασιλῆος basilêos (from βασιλῆϝος basilêwos) → Classical Attic βασιλέως basiléōs (genitive singular)
βασιλῆα basilêa → βασιλέᾱ basiléā (accusative singular)
βασιλῆας basilêas → βασιλέᾱς basiléās (accusative plural)

- Attic ναῦς naûs "ship" (from *νᾱῦς *nāûs by shortening of ā: Latin nāv-is)

νηός nēós (from *νᾱϝός *nāwós) → νεώς neṓs) (genitive singular)

- πόλις pólis "city"

πόληος pólēos (from *πόληι̯ος *pólēyos) → πόλεως póleōs (genitive singular)

- ἄστυ ástu "town"

*ἄστηος *ástēos (from *ϝάστηϝος *wástēwos) → ἄστεως ásteōs (genitive singular)

The accent of the genitive singular of the last two words violates the rules of accentuation. Normally the long vowel of the last syllable would force the accent forward to the second-to-last syllable, giving *πολέως *poléōs and *ἀστέως *astéōs, but instead the accent remains where it was before shortening.

Other forms of these nouns shorten ē to e, but because the vowel of the ending is long, no quantitative metathesis occurs:

- βασιλήων *basilḗōn → βασιλέων basiléōn (genitive plural)

Some forms shorten ē to e before i according to the analogue of the other forms, but without lengthening the i:

Homeric βασιλῆi basilêi → Attic βασιλεῖ basileî (dative singular)

Other forms involve no shortening, since they come from a short e-grade form of the stem. The accent of the genitive plural is sometimes irregular because it follows the analogue of the genitive singular:

*πολέι̯-ων poléy-ōn → πόλεων póleōn (genitive plural — re-accented after genitive singular)

*ϝαστέϝ-ων

- wastéw-ōn → ἄστεων ásteōn (also re-accented)

=== Participle ===
The perfect participle of the verb θνῄσκω thnēískō "die" undergoes vowel shortening, and quantitative metathesis in the oblique forms:

- *τεθνηϝώτς tethnēwṓts → τεθνεώς tethneṓs "dead" (masculine nominative singular: perfect with stative meaning)

*τεθνηϝότος *tethnēwótos → τεθνεῶτος tethneôtos (masculine/neuter genitive singular)

== See also ==
- Metathesis (linguistics)
- Ancient Greek nouns: Vowel-stems
