= WTHI =

WTHI may refer to:

- WTHI-FM, a radio station (99.9 FM) licensed to Terre Haute, Indiana, United States
- WTHI-TV, a television station (channel 10) licensed to Terre Haute, Indiana, United States
- WPFR (AM), a radio station (1480 AM) licensed to Terre Haute, Indiana, United States, which held the call sign WTHI until 2000
