= Mispronunciation =

Incorrect or inaccurate pronunciation of a word

In linguistics, mispronunciation is the act of pronouncing a word incorrectly. Languages are pronounced in different ways by different people, depending on factors like the area they grew up in, their level of education, and their social class. Even within groups of the same area and class, people can pronounce words differently.

A standard of pronunciation is the most common way to pronounce a word. Standards vary among groups. Dictionaries include pronunciations.

Languages constantly change, split up, and diverge. Diversity within languages as a natural consequence of language evolution is now acknowledged. This diversity is studied.

== Pronunciation in dictionaries ==
Early dictionaries, such as those by Samuel Johnson in England and later Noah Webster in the United States, played a large role in making spelling more uniform. When dictionaries began to add pronunciation guides, they played a similar role there. At first, American dictionaries (at least) tended to avoid listing pronunciations that they considered non-standard, and thus they played a prescriptive role (the British tradition is far more descriptive). However, following the general trend in linguistics, American dictionaries are now becoming more descriptive while British dictionaries are becoming less so (with Australian ones remaining in between); this is the case in other respects as well as with pronunciation. For example, the pronunciation of the word nuclear as if it were spelled nucular is one that is frowned upon by some, but the pronunciation is listed in some dictionaries that prefer to list current, common pronunciations rather than one prescribed as "correct".

== Pronunciation change ==
The following are some of the processes by which pronunciation can change.

=== Omission of phonemes ===
Many words have lost phonemes (consonant or vowel sounds) somewhere in their histories. Sometimes, this changes the standard of pronunciation. For example, the silent k at the start of many words in the English language was originally pronounced. However, a word is mispronounced if a phoneme is omitted when it is not normally pronounced that way. For example, some speakers omit the first c sound from Antarctic, resulting in a pronunciation ("ant-AR-tik").

=== Adaptation to a different language ===
Words and names that are adopted from one language to another can be mispronounced because the phonology of the source language is different from that in the destination language.

Proper nouns such as names of people and places are written as foreign words and often given their native pronunciation too.

== Terms ==
An incorrect pronunciation of Launceston (the name of a city in Tasmania), which follows the word's spelling literally

- Spelling pronunciation: Pronouncing a word according to its infelicitous or ambiguous spelling.
- Aphesis: The loss of the sound at the start of a word.
- Aspiration: An "h" sound at the beginning of a word. For example, the "h" in honor (British: honour) is not pronounced, but it is in "happy." As with all pronunciation "rules," conventions regarding the aspirated "H" differ from region to region. In parts of the US, it is customary to pronounce "herb" without the initial "h" sound, while in the UK, the initial "h" is aspirated.
- Epenthesis: The addition of one or more sounds to a word, especially to the interior of a word (prothesis at the beginning and paragoge at the end are commonly used). Epenthesis may be divided into two types: excrescence, for the addition of a consonant, and anaptyxis for the addition of a vowel.
- Metathesis: The reversal of letters within a word when pronounced. For example, "iron" is pronounced as "iorn."
- Orthoepy: is the study of pronunciation of a particular language, within a specific oral tradition.
- Shibboleth: Any practice that shows one's social or regional origin. This usually refers to features of language, and particularly to a word whose pronunciation identifies its speaker as a member of a particular group.
- Spoonerism: The exchange of the initial letters or syllables between two words or even within a word, with comic results—especially when the result changes the speaker's intended meaning.

== Automatic detection ==
Using computational techniques, such as machine learning, it is possible to automatically detect mispronunciations in recorded speech.

== See also ==
- Pronunciation
