= Attic declension =

Declension pattern of some Attic nouns

The Attic declension is a group of second-declension nouns and adjectives in the Attic dialect of Ancient Greek, all of whose endings have long vowels. In contrast, normal second-declension nouns have some short vowels and some long vowels. This declension is called Attic because in other dialects, including Ionic and Koine, the nouns are declined normally.

== History ==
In Proto-Greek, Attic-declension nouns had long ᾱ ā and digamma (ϝ w) before the endings. The Doric dialect preserved the ᾱ, but lost the digamma by the classical period. In the Aeolic dialect, the digamma was retained as upsilon (υ u).

In the Ionic dialect, the ᾱ changed to long η ē. In Attic, η was shortened to ε e and, if possible, the vowel of the ending was lengthened to ω ō or (if it was a diphthong with iota) ῳ ōi.

- Doric νᾱός (Aeolic ναῦος) → Ionic νηός → Attic νεώς "temple"
  nāós (naûos) → nēós → neṓs
- νηοῦ → νεώ (genitive)
  nēoû → neṓ
- νηῷ → νεῴ (dative)
  nēō̂i → neṓi

The shortening and lengthening was caused by quantitative metathesis, the switching of vowel lengths. In the forms where there is no lengthening, the change is simply vowel shortening.

== Accent ==
When the last syllable is accented, it takes an acute, even if the non-Attic form has a circumflex.

If the non-Attic form is accented on the third-from-last syllable, the Attic form is accented on the same syllable, even when it violates the rules of accent. Normally the accent would be forced forward to the second-to-last syllable.

- Homeric Μενέλᾱος → Ionic Μενέληος → Attic Μενέλεως (not *Μενελέως)

This is as if εω were analysed as one long vowel instead of a short vowel and long vowel. This occurs with the Homeric first-declension ending -εω (synizesis).

== Sources ==
- Herbert Weir Smyth. Greek Grammar. paragraphs 237, 238, 239: Attic declension; paradigm; accent.

== See also ==
- Ancient Greek nouns: Attic declension
- Quantitative metathesis
- Ancient Greek dialects
- Attic Greek
- Ionic Greek
- Koine Greek
