= WINH =

WINH may refer to:

- WINH (FM), a radio station (91.9 FM) licensed to serve Hinckley, Minnesota, United States
- WWVR (FM), a radio station (98.5 FM) licensed to serve Paris, Illinois, United States, which held the call sign WINH from 2006 to 2009
