= WIBQ =

Radio station in Terre Haute, Indiana, United States

- Terre Haute, Indiana; United States
- Frequency: 1230 kHz

Ownership
- Owner: Midwest Communications; (Midwest Communications, Inc.)
- Sister stations: WWVR; WTHI-FM; WBOW; WMGI

History
- First air date: 1958
- Last air date: January 12, 2026
- Former call signs: WMFT (1958–1963); WAAC (1963–1983); WPFR (1983–1987); WYTL (1987–1991); WJSH (1991–2000); WSJX (2000–2002); WBOW (2002–2014)
- Former frequencies: 1300 kHz (1958–2011)

Technical information
- Facility ID: 136105
- Class: C
- Power: 1,000 watts
- Transmitter coordinates: 39°29′21.1″N 87°25′10.1″W

WIBQ (1230 AM) was a radio station licensed to Terre Haute, Indiana, United States, and served the Terre Haute area. It first began broadcasting in 1958 under the call sign WMFT. Last owned by Midwest Communications, through licensee Midwest Communications, Inc., it carried a talk radio format upon its 2026 closure.

== History ==
WIBQ's history combines the intellectual property of a now-defunct 1300 AM with a newer license on 1230 AM.

=== AM 1300 history ===
The Mobley and Ford families, organized as the Citizens Broadcasting Company, received the construction permit for WWVR on 1300 kHz. Before going on air, the call letters changed to WMFT. After several sales within Citizens, the station relaunched as WAAC on May 1, 1963. By 1977, ownership was concentrated in Martha Foulkes, doing business as Marchild, Inc.

Foulkes sold WIBQ in 1982 to the Oak Ridge Boys Broadcasting Corporation of Indiana. The new owners relaunched the station as WPFR on March 17, 1983, simulcasting WPFR-FM (now WBOW). On November 9, 1987, the call sign was changed to WYTL. The company that owned WPFR, WPFR-FM, and WYTL went into bankruptcy and both stations went off the air in 1991.

In 1992, current WAXI morning personality Ronn Mott purchased the station with the help of banker Terry Tevlin, the call sign had been changed to WJSH prior to the sale on October 22, 1991. The station was again sold to an individual in Connecticut which eventually led to the station going off the air for a second time in 1996.

The station was again sold in late 1996, this time to current owner Crossroads Communications. They brought the station back on the air in January 1997, simulcasting new sister station WSDM-FM. In 1998 the simulcast ended and the format was changed to Southern Gospel with some programming coming from Reach Network out of Nashville, Tennessee.

The format was again changed in 1999 to sports radio ("The X") prompting the call sign to be changed to WSJX on March 1, 2000. The call sign was changed to WBOW on August 1, 2002, utilizing the legendary call sign that had been used on 1230 AM and 640 AM in the Terre Haute metropolitan area from 1927 until 2001 when 640 AM went dark. The WBOW call sign was later picked up by sister station 102.7 FM in 2003 as WBOW-FM. The station continued to broadcast a sports radio format along with sister station WSDX, featuring programming from ESPN Radio, until September 18, 2012, when AM 1300 changed its format to news/talk.

=== WIBQ moves to 1230 AM ===
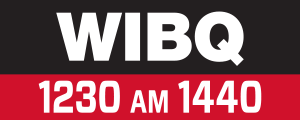
Logo during simulcast with WIBU

On June 14, 2011, the Bott Broadcasting Company obtained the construction permit for 1230 AM in Terre Haute as WYGJ, bringing the frequency back to life in the city since the demise of WBUZ, the station that had replaced WBOW when it moved to a new 640 AM facility in the early 1990s. With three months before the permit was to expire, in March 2014, Bott sold the permit to Midwest to relocate WIBQ from 1300 to 1230. The WYGJ call letters moved to 1300 AM, which went silent and was turned in to the Federal Communications Commission (FCC).

On January 12, 2026, WIBQ went off the air and its license was surrendered to the FCC. The licensed was cancelled on that date. Its 97.9 FM translator changed its parent station to WTHI-HD2 and changed its format to oldies as "Superhits 97.9".
