= Don Fischer =

American sports broadcaster

Don Fischer (born September 26, 1947) is the radio play-by-play announcer of Indiana Hoosiers men's basketball and football. He has been "the Voice of the Hoosiers" since 1973.

== Early life ==
Fischer grew up in Rochelle, Illinois, a suburb of Rockford. He was an ardent sports fan from at least the age of eight. His favorite team was the Pittsburgh Pirates, and he frequently pulled in Bob Prince's broadcasts of their games. He also listened to Harry Caray and Gene Elston.

By his own admission, Fischer was an indifferent student. After graduating from high school in 1965, college was out of the question, and he went through six jobs in a little over a year. While at the sixth job, as a ticket clerk at the Chicago, Burlington and Quincy Railroad station in Mendota, he saw a full-page ad in Sport for a home correspondence course offered by a broadcasting school in Wisconsin. Halfway through the course, he learned a radio station in Butte, Montana, was looking for a DJ and janitor. While he was still raw, station officials liked his audition tape enough that they invited him for an interview. He got the job, and spent 15 months there. He then came back east and got his first taste of play-by-play by calling games for high schools in and around Ottawa and Springfield, Illinois.

When his employers in Springfield changed formats and dropped sports programming, Fischer got in touch with Joe Tait, whom he had met while calling the Illinois High School Association basketball tournament. By this time, Tait was general manager and sports director at WBOW in Terre Haute, Indiana. However, Tait was about to move to Cleveland as the radio voice of the Cleveland Cavaliers, and recommended that Fischer take his place as WBOW's sports director. He did as many as 175 high school and college games per year. However, in 1973, the station's new owners decided to drop sports programming.

== The Voice of the Hoosiers ==
Fischer was not out of work for long, however. His former boss at WBOW, Harvey Glor, had learned that WIRE in Indianapolis had won the rights to create the first exclusive radio network for IU sports, and was looking for an announcer. Glor suggested that Fischer apply for the job. The 26-year-old Fischer was among the last of 300 people to apply for the job, but was hired. He has been the only full-time radio voice in Hoosiers' history.

Fischer is best known for his calls of Hoosier basketball, having called six of IU's eight Final Fours and three of its five national champions. In football, he has called all but one of the Hoosiers' 18 all-time bowl appearances, including the 2025 season which resulted in the Hoosiers winning the national championship.

During his first IU game, Fischer inadvertently metathesized his new employer's name, calling it the "University of Indiana" instead of "IU" or "Indiana University" at least three times in the first half. Fischer admitted later that he was used to his home state's own style of word order, with the University of Illinois being known as that or the "U of I". His procedural memory was not used to university being the last word rather than the first in IU's name. Fans were so upset that WIRE's switchboard "lit up like a Christmas tree," and he feared he would be fired in short order. However, WIRE retained him. Fischer has become a Hoosier fixture, calling over 2,000 football and basketball games.

He was named Indiana Sportscaster of the Year 22 times by the National Sportscasters and Sportswriters Association, and an additional four times by the Indiana Sportswriters and Sportscasters Association. The latter organization inducted him into their Hall of Fame in 2004. He was also inducted into the Indiana Broadcast Pioneers Hall of Fame in 2010. From 1973 to 1987, he also called college basketball games for ABC Sports. He has occasionally called preseason television games for the Indianapolis Colts.

Fischer attributes his longevity to good conditioning. In an interview with Awful Announcing, Fischer described himself as a "frustrated athlete" who has kept in shape "throughout most of my life."
