= WJSH (disambiguation) =

WJSH is a radio station (104.7 FM) licensed to Folsom, Louisiana.

WJSH may refer to:

- Ware Junior Senior High School, a school in Ware, Massachusetts
- Waseca Junior and Senior High School, a school in Waseca, Minnesota
- Watervliet Junior-Senior High School, a school in Watervliet, New York
- Woodbury Junior-Senior High School, a school in Woodbury, New Jersey
- WIBQ, a radio station (1230 AM) licensed to Terre Haute, Indiana, which held the call sign WJSH from 1991 to 2000
