= WBUZ =

WBUZ may refer to:

- WBUZ (FM), a radio station (102.9 FM) licensed to La Vergne, Tennessee, United States
- WBUZ (New York), a defunct AM radio station in Fredonia, New York, United States
- WTOD (FM), a radio station (106.5 FM) licensed to Delta, Ohio, United States that held the WBUZ callsign from 1994 to 2000
