= Greek nouns =

Greek nouns may refer to:

- Ancient Greek nouns
- Modern Greek grammar: Nouns
