= Wally Bruner =

American journalist and television host (1931–1997)

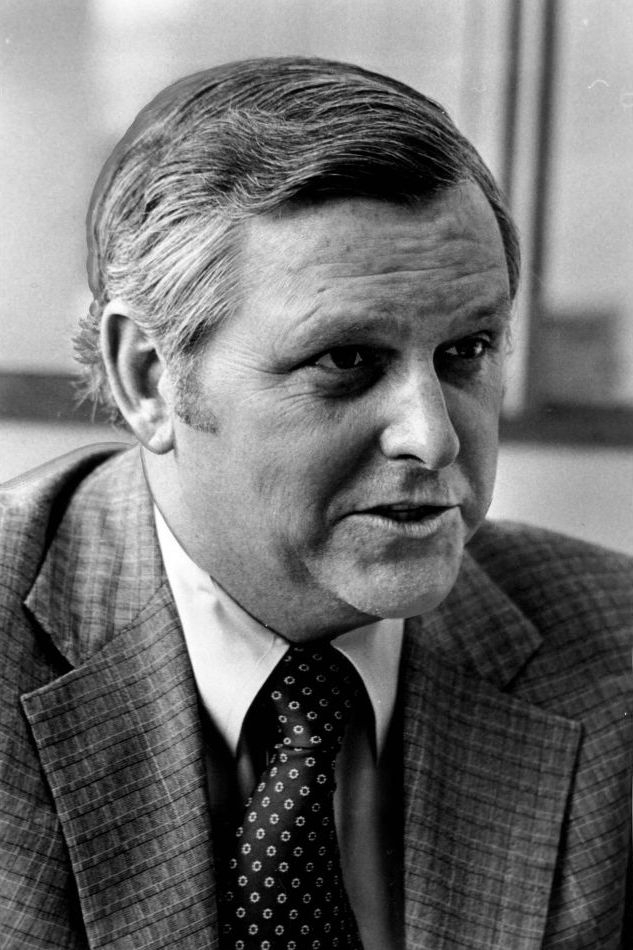
Bruner in 1975

Wallace Bruner Jr. (March 4, 1931 – November 3, 1997) was an American journalist and television host. He covered Congress and the Lyndon Johnson administration for ABC News in the 1960s. He was the first host of the 1968–1975 syndicated version of What's My Line? and went on to host the syndicated home repair show Wally's Workshop. He was also one of the first Americans to receive a heart transplant.

== Personal life ==
Bruner was born on March 4, 1931, in Ames, Iowa, to Wallace and Audrey (Scott) Bruner. He was raised in Tell City, Indiana.

He married his classmate, the former Patricia Thomas, after graduation. The two later jointly built and operated radio station WKZI in Casey, Illinois. They had eight children: Rickey, born in 1950, Sherri, born in 1951; Michael, born in 1952, Ted and Tim (twins), born in 1954, Kathy and Kevin (twins), born in 1955, and Kristine, born in 1957. They divorced in the late 1960s.

Bruner met his second wife, Natalie, on Capitol Hill as she was the press secretary for Senator George Smathers. They had two children, Wally Jr. and Lee. Natalie co-starred on Wally's Workshop. In the early 1990s, she ran unsuccessfully for the United States Congress on the Democratic ticket against Dan Burton of Indiana; her husband served as her campaign manager.

Bruner himself was also active in politics. He served as campaign manager for Senator Vance Hartke (D-Indiana), and as west coast coordinator of Senator Eugene McCarthy's campaign for president. He also produced an album of poetry with Senator Everett Dirksen (R-Illinois) and created one of the first film libraries for the purpose of selling archived interviews and footage to the network news programs.

Bruner was one of the first heart transplant recipients in the United States, after he suffered a heart attack in his 50s.

Bruner died on November 3, 1997, of liver cancer, in Indianapolis, at age 66. Natalie, along with the ten children, survive him.

== Early television career ==
Bruner began his career in television as "Wally the Weatherman" with WTHI-TV in Terre Haute, Indiana, in the mid-1950s and continued with a variety of roles in small-market stations around the country. He also built and operated radio station WKZI in Casey, Illinois, with his first wife, Patricia. He also was News Director of KTVK, the then ABC affiliate in Phoenix, Arizona, where he worked with his Assistant News Director and cinematographer, Stanley Rocklin.

He then landed a job as Capitol Hill correspondent for ABC News and he moved to Washington, D.C. As a news correspondent, he covered the US Congress and the White House throughout the late 1960s; was nominated for an Emmy Award for his coverage of the war in Santo Domingo; and went to Vietnam to cover the war. Upon his return from Vietnam, he helped organize the AFTRA strike to force the networks to treat war correspondents more fairly. Following his time with ABC, he served as co-anchor with Alan Smith of the nightly news for Washington, D.C. television station WTTG.

== What's My Line? ==
In 1968, producer Mark Goodson approached Bruner to audition for the new syndicated version of What's My Line? Bruner's background as an ABC News correspondent had been shared by the program's original host, John Charles Daly.

Part of Bruner's audition was an opportunity to view old kinescopes of the original CBS version. Bruner told Goodson that he did not need to do so, since one of his jobs in the 1950s had been to direct commercial breaks of the network feed of What's My Line? He claimed to have seen every episode that aired over a period of several years.

Bruner hosted the show from CBS Studio 50, the Ed Sullivan Theater, from 1968 to 1972. Broadway actor Larry Blyden succeeded him for the program's final three seasons.

== Wally's Workshop ==
After leaving What's My Line? with over 1,000 episodes under his belt, Bruner created and hosted a home-repair how-to show he called Wally's Workshop. The show featured Bruner and his second wife Natalie working on home projects in a studio space.

Wally's Workshop was syndicated in 80 markets, running from 1971 to circa 1985. During his first four years hosting Wally's Workshop, Bruner made one last appearance on What's My Line? This time, he did so as its "mystery guest," during one of the editions that Blyden moderated.

Media offices
Preceded by John Daly	Host-moderator of What's My Line? 1968–1972	Succeeded by Larry Blyden
