= WLHW =

- Casey, Illinois; United States
- Frequency: 91.5 MHz
- Branding: Word Power, Inc.

Programming
- Format: Christian radio

Ownership
- Owner: American Hope Communications, Inc.
- Sister stations: WKZI; WEHP; WPFR

History
- First air date: 2006

Technical information
- Licensing authority: FCC
- Facility ID: 73713
- Class: A
- ERP: 6,000 watts
- HAAT: 60 meters (200 ft)
- Transmitter coordinates: 39°18′14.1″N 87°58′15.1″W

Links
- Public license information: Public file; LMS
- Website: wjly.org

WLHW is a Christian radio station licensed to Casey, Illinois, broadcasting on 91.5 FM. The station is owned by American Hope Communications, Inc.

WLHW was originally owned by Word Power, Inc. Effective October 29, 2021, it was sold to American Hope Communications, along with WKZI, WPFR, WPFR-FM, and three translators, for $179,000.
