= Compensatory lengthening =

Lengthening of vowel sounds in place of a deleted consonant

Compensatory lengthening in phonology and historical linguistics is the lengthening of a vowel sound that happens upon the loss of a following consonant, usually in the syllable coda, or of a vowel in an adjacent syllable. Lengthening triggered by consonant loss may be considered an extreme form of fusion (Crowley 1997:46). Both types may arise from speakers' attempts to preserve a word's moraic count.

== Examples ==
=== English ===
An example from the history of English is the lengthening of vowels that happened when the voiceless velar fricative /x/ and its palatal allophone [ç] were lost from the language. For example, in the Middle English of Chaucer's time the word night was phonemically /nixt/; later the /x/ was lost, but the /i/ was lengthened to /iː/ to compensate, causing the word to be pronounced /niːt/. (Later the /iː/ became /aɪ/ by the Great Vowel Shift.)

Both the Germanic spirant law and the Ingvaeonic nasal spirant law show vowel lengthening compensating for the loss of a nasal.

Non-rhotic forms of English have a lengthened vowel before a historical post-vocalic */r/: in Scottish English, girl has a short /ɪ/ followed by a light alveolar /r/, as presumably it did in Middle English; in Southern British English, the */r/ has dropped out of the spoken form and the vowel has become a "long schwa" [əː].

=== Classical Hebrew and Aramaic ===
Compensatory lengthening in Classical Hebrew and Aramaic is dependent on the class of consonant which follows the prefix (definite article in Hebrew and prefix waw-hahipukh in both languages).

E.g. (using the Hebrew definite article [hey with pataḥ plus dagesh in following consonant]):

- Before ע and א it is usually הָ.
- Before ח and ה it is usually הַ. If it is pretonic it may be הָ.
- But when it is propretonic, whatever the guttural, it will usually be הֶ.

=== Ancient Greek ===
Compensatory lengthening is very common in Ancient Greek. It is particularly notable in forms where n or nt comes together with s, y (= ι̯), or i. The development of nt + y was perhaps thus:

- *mont-yă → montsa (palatalization ty → ts) → mõtsa (nasalization and vowel lengthening) → mõssa → mõsa (shortening ss → s) → mōsa (denasalization, retention of long vowel) = μοῦσα "muse"

Forms with this type of compensatory lengthening include the nominative singular and dative plural of many participles, adjectives, and nouns, the 3rd person plural ending for present and future active of all verbs, and the 3rd person singular present of athematic verbs:

- *πάντ-ς → πᾶς "every, whole" (masculine nominative singular)
- *πάντ-ι̯ᾰ → *πάντσα → πᾶσα (feminine)
- *πάντ-σι → πᾶσι (masculine/neuter dative plural)
- compare παντ-ός (m./n. genitive singular)
- *όντ-ι̯ᾰ → *όντσα → οὖσα participle "being" (feminine nominative singular)
- *οντ-ίᾱ → *ονσία → οὐσία "property, essence"
- compare ὀντ-ός (m./n. genitive singular, from participle ὤν "being",)
- Doric ἄγ-ο-ντι → ἄγοντσι → Attic/Ionic ἄγουσι "they drive"
- Doric φα-ντί → *φαντσί → Attic/Ionic φᾱσί "they say"

=== Indo-Aryan languages ===
In the evolution of the modern Indo-Aryan languages, there is a first stage in which consonant clusters with dissimilar consonants preceded by a short vowel undergo assimilation resulting in consonant clusters with similar consonants. In the second stage, the first consonant of the cluster or geminate was lost, which was accompanied by the lengthening of that vowel and sometimes additional nasalization. In Punjabi, only the first stage occurred, while most of the other modern Indo-Aryan languages underwent the second stage as well.

Sanskrit	Punjabi	Hindi	Translation
हस्तः (hastaḥ)	ਹੱਥ (hatth)	हाथ (hāth)	hand
सप्त (sapta)	ਸੱਤ (satt)	सात (sāt)	seven
अष्ट (aṣṭa)	ਅੱਠ (aṭṭh)	आठ (āṭh)	eight
कर्तनम् (kartanaṃ)	ਕੱਟਨਾ (kaṭṭanā)	काटना (kāṭanā)	cutting
कर्म (karma)	ਕੰਮ (kamm)	काम (kām)	work
अर्धम् (ardhaṃ)	ਅੱਧਾ (addhā)	आधा (ādhā)	half
अद्य (adya)	ਅੱਜ (ajj)	आज (āj)	today
सर्पः (sarpaḥ)	ਸੱਪ (sapp)	साँप (sā(n)p)	snake
अक्षि (akṣi)	ਅੱਖ (akkh)	आँख (ā(n)kh)	eye
दुग्धम् (dugdhaṃ)	ਦੁੱਧ (duddh)	दूध (dūdh)	milk
पुत्रः (putraḥ)	ਪੁੱਤ (putt)	पूत (pūt)	son

=== Maltese ===
The phonemes /ɣ/, /ʕ/, and /h/ were all vocalised in Maltese during a period spanning from the 18th to 20th centuries (except in word-final position where they were generally merged with /ħ/). In the spelling they are still represented, however, as għ for historic /ɣ/ and /ʕ/, and h for historic /h/. These vowelised consonants lengthen adjacent short vowels, i.e. both preceding and following ones. For example, jagħmel ("he does"), formerly [ˈjaʕ.mɛl], now pronounced [ˈjaː.mɛl], and jitgħallem ("he learns"), formerly [jɪtˈʕal.lɛm], now pronounced [jɪˈtaːl.lɛm].

=== Turkish ===
The voiced velar fricative (/ɣ/), has undergone a sound change in Turkish by which the consonant was completely lost and compensatory lengthening of the preceding vowel occurred. Even though the sound has been completely lost in standard Turkish, the sound change is not yet complete in some Turkish dialects and the corresponding velar fricative found in cognate words in the closely related Azerbaijani language and the Turkish-influenced Crimean Tatar language. The previous consonantal nature of the sound is evinced by earlier English loanwords from Turkish, such as yogurt/yoghurt (modern Turkish yoğurt, Turkish pronunciation: [joˈurt]) and agha (modern Turkish ağa, Turkish pronunciation: [a'a]).

The letter Ğ in Turkish alphabet and its counterpart ⟨غ⟩ in Ottoman Turkish were once pronounced as /ɣ/. In modern Turkish, Ğ is used either as a silent letter indicating a syllable break or as a vowel lengthener for the preceding sound. It can also indicate the /j/ sound, if the preceding vowel is an /e/.

== See also ==
- Mora
- Phonological history of English
- Ancient Greek nouns
