= WBOW =

Classic hits radio station in Terre Haute, Indiana

- Terre Haute, Indiana; United States
- Broadcast area: Terre Haute metropolitan area
- Frequency: 102.7 MHz
- Branding: 102.7 WBOW

Programming
- Format: Classic hits

Ownership
- Owner: Midwest Communications; (Midwest Communications, Inc.)
- Sister stations: WWVR; WMGI; WTHI-FM

History
- First air date: 1961 (as WPFR)
- Former call signs: WPFR (1961–1983); WPFR-FM (1983–1992); WLEZ (1992–2003); WBOW-FM (2003–2012); WDWQ (2012–2017)
- Call sign meaning: Banks of the Wabash Broadcasting Association (founding owners of WBOW (1230 AM))

Technical information
- Licensing authority: FCC
- Facility ID: 6334
- Class: B
- ERP: 28,000 watts
- HAAT: 201 meters (659 ft)
- Transmitter coordinates: 39°20′13.1″N 87°28′0″W

Links
- Public license information: Public file; LMS
- Webcast: Listen live
- Website: 1027wbow.com

WBOW (102.7 FM) is a radio station broadcasting a classic hits format. Licensed to Terre Haute, Indiana, it serves the Terre Haute metropolitan area. It first began broadcasting in 1961 under the call sign WPFR. The station is owned by Midwest Communications through licensee Midwest Communications, Inc.

== History ==
The station signed on in 1961 as WPFR. When its companion station AM 1300 (later WIBQ) became WPFR on March 17, 1983, the call sign was changed to WPFR-FM with a Top 40/CHR format, as "Power 103". By 1987, its CHR format had faded into a short-lived Rock 40 format but only lasted for less than a year, retaining back its mainstream format. The company that owned WPFR and WPFR-FM went into bankruptcy and both stations went off the air in 1991. Bomar Broadcasting purchased the license for 102.7 FM in 1992 and changed the call sign to WLEZ on April 1, 1992. In September 1993, the station went back on the air with a beautiful music format after a new transmitter was constructed. By 1997, the format had shifted to a soft adult contemporary format which eventually was supplied by Jones Radio Network.

On May 12, 2003, the station was sold to Crossroads Communications. The call sign was changed to WBOW-FM on September 1, 2003, as "Light Rock B102-7", utilizing the call sign that had been used on 1230 AM and 640 AM in the Terre Haute metropolitan area from 1927 until 2001 when 640 AM went dark. The previous WBOW-FM had operated with those call letters between 1968 and 1974. The WBOW call sign was also picked up by sister station AM 1300 in 2002.

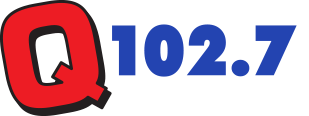
Logo as "Q102.7"

On July 1, 2012, WBOW-FM was sold by Crossroads Communications to Midwest Communications and changed its call letters to WDWQ and changed its format to country, branded as "Q102.7". The sale of WDWQ and WBOW was consummated on October 26, 2012, at a purchase price of $1.3 million.

WDWQ switched to a classic hits format on December 26, 2017, and brought back the WBOW call letters. The first song to air as a classic hits format was "Still the One" by Orleans.

WBOW's facilities are located at 925 Wabash Avenue, Suite 300 in Terre Haute, Indiana.
