= WBUZ (New York) =

Radio station in Fredonia, New York (1957–1991)

Fredonia; United States
- Broadcast area: Western New York
- Frequency: 1570 kHz
- Branding: 1570 The Buzz

Programming
- Format: Defunct (was country music)
- Affiliations: ABC/C

Ownership
- Owner: Henry Serafin (dba Catocin Broadcasting)

History
- First air date: August 11, 1957
- Last air date: June 1, 1991
- Call sign meaning: BUZz

Technical information
- Class: D
- Power: 250 watts (day); 143 watts (night)

WBUZ (1570 AM, "1570 The Buzz") was a radio station that was based in Fredonia, New York. The station was privately owned by Henry Serafin.

== History ==
The station signed on the air in August 1957 under the ownership of permittee Louis W. Skelly, who received the permit to build the station on August 27, 1956. Studios and offices were located at 15 East Main Street in Fredonia. The station operated at a daytime-only power of 250 watts.

Skelly, a native of Austintown, Ohio, sold the station to Dunkirk-Fredonia Broadcasting, Inc., which also owned the Dunkirk-Fredonia Observer newspaper. The transaction was finalized on January 1, 1959.

On April 4, 1963, the Federal Communications Commission (FCC) granted permission to move the station to 2 West Main Street in Fredonia, with the transmitting equipment and tower located on Clinton Avenue. The station would remain at this address until July 6, 1973, when a fire damaged the building, prompting a temporary relocation to 60 West Main Street, and then 27 East Main Street after a permanent studio location could be obtained. Later in September of that same year, the station received pre-sunrise authorization to operate at 90 watts from 6am to local sunrise.

Catocin Broadcasting Corporation, a company owned by Washington D.C. communications attorney Lauren Colby and Henry Serafin, purchased the station on March 12, 1973. Five years later, Colby's interest in the company was acquired by Serafin, who became the sole stockholder.

WBUZ relocated its studios and offices in 1985 to 14 Water Street in Fredonia. By the end of the decade, the station received authorization to operate at night with a limited power of 143 watts.

Catocin, under Serafin's control, maintained ownership until the station fell silent after its license was canceled by the FCC on June 1, 1991.

== Revocation of licenses ==
Public objection to WBUZ's license renewal first surfaced on May 6, 1981. FCC records indicate the filing of an "Informal Objection to License Renewal" by attorney Andrew Schwartzman, who filed the objection on behalf of Chautauqua County Rural Ministry, the Dunkirk-Fredonia League of Women Voters, and the Dunkirk branch of the NAACP. The objections arose out of Serafin's alleged refusal to hire an African-American woman as a secretary, and his refusal to grant equal time to opposing views surrounding matters concerning public housing, local police, and a water fluoridation project as required under the Fairness Doctrine of the era.

In September 1985, the American Society of Composers, Authors and Publishers revoked WBUZ's license to play songs by ASCAP artists due to Serafin defaulting on royalty payments. WBUZ continued to air the songs, prompting ASCAP to sue. Residents also complained that Serafin was running contests and not awarding the stated prizes.

In April 1987, the FCC's board recommended the cancellation of WBUZ's license. When Serafin said he needed time to try finding a buyer for the station, federal judge Walter Miller offered Serafin the option of additional time by selling under the FCC's 'distress sale' policy, which allows discounted sales to minorities. Serafin reportedly refused the offer, and the station fell silent in 1989.

The WBUZ calls would end up on a short-lived AM station in Terre Haute, Indiana, in 2000 (see WBOW [1230 AM]). The station, in the midst of its own license revocation proceedings, closed the next year. There is now a WBUZ FM licensed in the Nashville, Tennessee, area.
