= WIBU =

Former simulcast of WIBQ, Terre Haute, Indiana

Paris, Illinois; United States
- Broadcast area: Terre Haute, Indiana
- Frequency: 1440 kHz
- Branding: The Talk Station 97.9, 1230, 1440

Programming
- Format: News/talk
- Affiliations: Fox News Radio; Compass Media Networks; Genesis Communications Network; Premiere Networks; Westwood One

Ownership
- Owner: Duey E. Wright; (Midwest Communications, Inc.)
- Sister stations: WIBQ

History
- First air date: 1951 (as WPRS)
- Last air date: July 6, 2025
- Former call signs: WPRS (1951–2017); WBOW (2017)
- Call sign meaning: similar to WIBQ

Technical information
- Licensing authority: FCC
- Facility ID: 51152
- Class: B
- Power: 1,000 watts day; 250 watts night
- Transmitter coordinates: 39°36′19.68649″N 87°43′31.74139″W

Links
- Public license information: Public file; LMS
- Webcast: Listen live
- Website: www.wibqam.com

WIBU (1440 AM) was a radio station broadcasting a news/talk format. Licensed to Paris, Illinois, United States, the station served the Terre Haute metropolitan area. The station was owned by Midwest Communications and featured programming from Fox News Radio, Compass Media Networks, Genesis Communications Network, Premiere Networks, and Westwood One.

The station broadcast local news during the morning, with some talk and local sports programming as well.

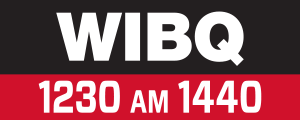
Logo before 97.9 translator sign on

On July 6, 2023, Midwest Communications surrendered WIBU's license to the Federal Communications Commission (FCC). The FCC cancelled the station's license on August 22.
