= Word stem =

Part of a word responsible for its lexical meaning

In linguistics, a word stem is a word part responsible for a word's lexical meaning. The term is used with slightly different meanings depending on the morphology of the language in question. For instance, in Athabaskan linguistics, a verb stem is a root that cannot appear on its own and that carries the tone of the word.

Typically, a stem remains unmodified during inflection with few exceptions due to apophony (for example in Polish, miast-o ("city") and w mieści-e ("in the city"); in English, sing, sang, and sung, where it can be modified according to morphological rules or peculiarities, such as sandhi).

Word stem comparisons across languages have helped reveal cognates that have allowed comparative linguists to determine language families and their history.

== Root vs stem ==
The word friendship is made by attaching the morpheme -ship to the root word friend (which some linguists also call a stem). While the inflectional plural morpheme -s can be attached to friendship to form friendships, it can not be attached to the root friend within friendship to form friendsship. A stem is a base from which all its inflected variants are formed. For example, the stabil- (a variant of stable unable to stand alone) is the root of the destabilized, while the stem consists of de·stabil·ize, including de- and -ize. The -(e)d, on the other hand, is not part of the stem.

A stem can be a lone root, such as the verb run; a compound of roots, such as the compound nouns meatball and bottleneck; or a derivation with affixes, such as the verbs blacken and standardize.

The stem of the verb to wait is wait: The stem is the word part that is common to all of its inflected variants.

1. wait (infinitive, imperative, present subjunctive, and present indicative except in the 3rd-person singular)
2. waits (third person singular of the simple present indicative)
3. waited (simple past)
4. waited (past participle)
5. waiting (present participle)

== Citation forms and bound morphemes ==
In languages with very little inflection, such as English and Chinese, the stem is usually not distinct from the "normal" form of the word (the lemma, citation, or dictionary form). However, in other languages, word stems may rarely or never occur on their own. For example, the English verb stem run is indistinguishable from its present tense form (except in the third person singular). However, the equivalent Spanish verb stem corr- never appears as such because it is cited with the infinitive inflection (correr) and always appears in speech as either a non-finite (infinitive or participle) or conjugated form. Such morphemes that cannot occur on their own in this way are usually referred to as bound morphemes.

In computational linguistics, the term "stem" is used for the part of the word that never changes, even morphologically, when inflected, and a lemma is the base form of the word. For example, given the word "produced", its lemma (linguistics) is "produce", but the stem is "produc-" because of the inflected form "producing".

== Paradigms and suppletion ==
A list of all the inflected forms of a word stem is called its inflectional paradigm. The paradigm of the adjective tall is given below, and the stem of this adjective is tall.

- tall (positive); taller (comparative); tallest (superlative)

Some paradigms do not make use of the same stem throughout; this phenomenon is called suppletion. An example of a suppletive paradigm is the paradigm for the adjective good: its stem changes from good to the bound morpheme bet-.

- good (positive); better (comparative); best (superlative)

== Oblique stem ==
=== Latin and Greek ===
Both in Latin and Greek, the declension (inflection) of some nouns uses a different stem in the oblique cases than in the nominative and vocative singular cases. Such words belong to, respectively, the so-called third declension of the Latin grammar and the so-called third declension of the Ancient Greek grammar. For example, the genitive singular is formed by adding -is (Latin) or -ος (Greek) to the oblique stem, and the genitive singular is conventionally listed in Greek and Latin dictionaries to illustrate the oblique.

Latin word	meaning	oblique stem
adeps	fat	adip-
altitudo	height	altitudin-
index	pointer	indic-
rex	king, ruler	reg-
supellex	equipment, furniture	supellectil-

Greek word	meaning	oblique stem
ἄναξ (ánax)	lord	ἄνακτ- (ánakt-)
ἀνήρ (anḗr)	man	ἀνδρ- (andr-)
κάλπις (kálpis)	jug	κάλπιδ- (kálpid-)
μάθημα (máthēma)	learning	μαθήματ- (mathḗmat-)

English words derived from Latin or Greek often involve the oblique stem: adipose, altitudinal, android, and mathematics.

Historically, the difference in stems arose due to sound changes in the nominative. In the Latin third declension, for example, the nominative singular suffix -s is combined with a stem-final consonant. If that consonant was c, the result was x (a mere orthographic change), while if it was g, the -s caused it to devoice, again resulting in x. If the stem-final consonant was another alveolar consonant (t, d, r), it elided before the -s. In a later era, n before the nominative ending was also lost, producing pairs like atlas, atlant- (for English Atlas, Atlantic).

=== Indo-Aryan ===
In a similar fashion to its classical relatives in Latin and Greek, Sanskrit has oblique consonant-final stems. These can be obtained through consonant sandhi, which induces voicing or other sound changes, often on final consonants of non-final words or affixes (though sometimes initial sounds of non-initial words or affixes can also be involved):

Word	Oblique stem	Word/affix	Compound
sat (truth)	sad	-bhiḥ, instrumental plural	sadbhiḥ (by/with many truths)
bhagavat (divine)	bhagavad	gītā (song)	bhagavadgītā (the Bhagavad Gita)

Generally, Indo-Aryan nominals prior to New Indo-Aryan have their lemma or citation form in the singular vocative case, rather than the singular nominative case like in the majority of languages historically, so compound words are usually composed of multiple words in their vocative forms. However, Sanskrit's -an and -in stems often do not have their lemma in the singular vocative case, so their compound forms are instead minimally marked.

First word, vocative	Nominative	Oblique stem	Second word, vocative	Nominative	Correct compound	Nominative	Erroneous compounds
rakta (blood)	raktaḥ	rakta	bīja (seed)	bījaḥ	raktabīja (pomegranate, lit. bloodseed)	raktabījaḥ	*raktasbījaḥ
rājan (king, chief)	rājā	rāja	putra (son)	putraḥ	rājaputra (prince, lit. king's son)	rājaputraḥ	*rājāputraḥ, *rājanputra

Significant phonetic changes in Middle Indo-Aryan meant that almost all nouns in Pali, Prakrit and Apabhramsa had the singular vocative case as their lemma, and consequently as their combining form, leading to a widespread disappearance of unique oblique stems like in Sanskrit's -an and -in stems. New Indo-Aryan underwent significant case syncretism, so the singular nominative case is now considered the predominant lemma, and consequently the most frequent combining form. But some languages such as Hindustani and Punjabi exhibit distinct oblique -e stems as combining forms for many masculine nouns ending in -ā:

Hindustani word (lemma)	Masculine	Oblique stem	Word compound
कला kalā (art)	No	कला kalā	कलाकार kalākār (artist)
दावा dāvā (claim)	Yes	दावे dāve	दावेदार dāvedār (claimant)
ठेका ṭhekā (contract)	Yes	ठेके ṭheke	ठेकेदार ṭhekedār (contractor)
रिश्ता riśtā (relationship)	Yes	रिश्ते riśte	रिश्तेदार riśtedār (relative)

Punjabi word (lemma)	Masculine	Oblique stem	Word compound
ਸੇਵਾ sevā (service)	No	ਸੇਵਾ sevā	ਸੇਵਾਦਾਰ sevādār (volunteer, disciple)
ਕੂੜਾ kūṛā (rubbish)	Yes	ਕੂੜੇ kūṛe	ਕੂੜੇਦਾਨ kūṛedān (garbage can)
ਮੂਸਾ mūsā (Moosa)	Yes	ਮੂਸੇ mūse	ਮੂਸੇਵਾਲਾ mūsevālā (resident of Moosa)
ਜੱਥਾ jatthā (squadron)	Yes	ਜੱਥੇ jatthe	ਜੱਥੇਦਾਰ jatthedār (commander, jathedar)

The oblique -e stem in these languages is quite literally a singular masculine oblique case, but in Hindustani it is also a singular masculine vocative case. Punjabi has since developed a distinct singular masculine vocative, but its word compounding behavior still acts as though it is equivalent to the oblique. The use of the singular vocative case as a unique oblique stem in parts of modern Indo-Aryan is hence a partial vestige of archaic Indo-Aryan grammar, where the singular vocative frequently served as both the lemma and the oblique stem.

== See also ==
- Lemma (morphology)
- Lexeme
- Morphological typology
- Morphology (linguistics)
- Principal parts
- Root (linguistics)
- Stemming algorithms (computer science)
- Thematic vowel
