= WKZI =

- Casey, Illinois; United States
- Broadcast area: Charleston-Mattoon area
- Frequency: 800 kHz

Programming
- Format: Christian radio

Ownership
- Owner: American Hope Communications, Inc.
- Sister stations: WLHW; WEHP; WPFR

History
- First air date: December 14, 1963

Technical information
- Licensing authority: FCC
- Facility ID: 73711
- Class: B
- Power: 250 watts
- Transmitter coordinates: 39°18′16.1″N 87°58′17.1″W
- Translators: 94.7 W234CK (Casey); 107.9 W300DD (Greenup)

Links
- Public license information: Public file; LMS
- Website: wjly.org

WKZI (800 AM) is a Christian radio station licensed to Casey, Illinois, United States. The station is owned by American Hope Communications, Inc.

== History ==
The station began broadcasting December 14, 1963, and was owned by Paul Dean Ford. It initially aired a big band format. By 1968, the station had adopted a country music format, which it continued to air until 1992. It was taken silent in 1992. In 1993, WKZI was transferred to Word Power, Inc., a nonprofit run by the Ford family, and the station adopted its current Christian format.

Effective October 29, 2021, the station was sold to American Hope Communications, along with WLHW, WPFR, WPFR-FM, and three translators, for $179,000.
