= WPFR (AM) =

- Terre Haute, Indiana; United States
- Frequency: 1480 kHz
- Branding: WPFR 106.3 FM

Programming
- Format: Conservative talk
- Affiliations: Premiere Networks; Salem Radio Network; Townhall News; Westwood One

Ownership
- Owner: American Hope Communications, Inc.
- Sister stations: WEHP; WKZI; WLHW

History
- First air date: January 6, 1948
- Former call signs: WTHI (1948–2000)

Technical information
- Licensing authority: FCC
- Facility ID: 70653
- Class: D
- Power: 244 watts day; 30 watts night
- Transmitter coordinates: 39°30′5.2″N 87°23′11.3″W
- Translator: 106.3 W292FT (Terre Haute)

Links
- Public license information: Public file; LMS
- Webcast: Listen live
- Website: wpfrnow.com

WPFR (1480 kHz) is a conservative talk AM radio station licensed to Terre Haute, Indiana. The station is owned by American Hope Communications, Inc.

== History ==
The station began broadcasting January 6, 1948, and originally held the call sign WTHI. The station ran 1,000 watts 24 hours a day. In 1970, the station's daytime power was increased to 5,000 watts. WTHI AM 1480, along with WTHI-FM, and WTHI-TV were long owned by Tony Hulman, and remained in his family's hands until 1998, when all three stations were sold to Emmis Communications.

WTHI aired a Top 40 format from the mid-1960s until January 1974, when the station adopted a country music format. By 1983, the station had adopted a MOR format. By 1988, the station had begun airing an oldies format. By 1991, the station had returned to airing a country music format, simulcasting 99.9 WTHI-FM.

The station adopted a news-talk format in 1992. As a news-talk station, WTHI was Terre Haute's home for prominent national personalities such as Rush Limbaugh and Paul Harvey, as well as The Bob & Tom Show. The station also carried The Mike Pence Show, a statewide talk show which Pence hosted prior to his election to congress.

In 2000, the station was donated to Word Power, Inc., and its call sign was changed to WPFR, with the station adopting a Christian format. The station was taken off the air in March 2020.

Effective October 29, 2021, it was sold to American Hope Communications, along with WKZI, WLHW, WPFR-FM, and three translators, for $179,000.
