= First declension =

Declension paradigm in Indo-European

The first declension is a category of declension that consists of mostly feminine nouns in Ancient Greek and Latin with the defining feature of a long ā (analysed as either a part of the stem or a case-ending). In Greek grammar, it is also called the alpha declension, since its forms have the letter α, at least in the plural.

In Latin and Greek grammar, the first declension is analyzed as a thematic declension. But its lack of a Proto-Indo-European thematic vowel (o or e) and of any nominative singular ending (ordinarily -s or -os) does not neatly place it within either of the Proto-Indo-European nominal categories, thematic and athematic. Therefore, it is assumed to be a newer formation: a suffix based on the neuter plural ending *-(e)h₂, forming a collective noun.

== Latin ==
=== Latin nouns and adjectives ===
Latin first declension has only one set of endings for both feminine and masculine nouns. Within this category of declension, most of these nouns are feminine.

The very small native masculine group includes only a few occupation nouns and nouns imported from the Greek masculine first declension.

- agricola "farmer" ← ager, agro- "field" and root of colō "I cultivate"
- poēta "poet" ← ποιητής poiētēs "one who composes" poetry
- pīrāta "pirate" ← πειρᾱτής peirātēs "one who makes an attempt on" someone
- aurīga "charioteer" ← aurea "horse's bridle" and agō "I do, lead, drive"

The same endings are used for the feminine gender of Latin adjectives.

== Ancient Greek ==
=== Greek nouns ===
Greek first declension has two basic classes of feminine endings and one basic class of masculine endings, distinguished by their original nominative singular: long -ā, short -(y)ă, long -ās. But besides the nominative and accusative singular of feminines, and nominative, genitive, and vocative singular of masculines, forms are the same between subclasses.

In the Attic dialect, an ā-ē split divides each class into two subclasses: nouns with ᾱ and nouns with η. By contrast, other dialects tend to generalize the vowel one way or the other — Ionic has only ē, and Doric and Aeolic have only ā.

=== Greek adjectives ===
The feminine of first- and second-declension adjectives uses the -ā class of the first declension:

- -os, -ā/ē, -on

First- and third-declension adjectives, including participles in -nt-, use the -(y)ă class. Here are examples of this class, which is complex because of sound changes involving the y (see Ancient Greek nouns: short a):

- -us, -eia, -u
- -ās, -aina, -an
- -ōn, -ousa, -on
- -ās, -āsa, -an
- -eis, -eisa, -en

== See also ==
- For specific information on the first declension as it appears in Latin and Greek, see the appropriate sections in Latin declension and Ancient Greek nouns.
