= WMGI =

Coordinates: 39.456°N 87.481°W

Terre Haute, Indiana; United States
- Broadcast area: Terre Haute metropolitan area
- Frequency: 100.7 MHz (HD Radio)
- Branding: 100.7 Mix FM

Programming
- Format: Top 40 (CHR)
- Subchannels: HD2: Superhits (oldies)

Ownership
- Owner: Midwest Communications; (Midwest Communications, Inc.)
- Sister stations: WBOW; WTHI-FM; WWVR

History
- First air date: June 13, 1960 (as WVTS)
- Former call signs: WVTS (1960-1986)

Technical information
- Licensing authority: FCC
- Facility ID: 6828
- Class: B
- ERP: 50,000 watts
- HAAT: 149 meters (489 ft)
- Translator: HD2: 97.9 W250BZ (Terre Haute)

Links
- Public license information: Public file; LMS
- Webcast: Listen live; HD2: Listen live
- Website: www.mymixfm.com; HD2: superhits979.com

WMGI (100.7 FM) is a radio station owned by Midwest Communications, Inc. in Terre Haute, Indiana. The studios are located at 925 Wabash Avenue in Terre Haute.

== History ==
On December 31, 1994, WMGI dropped soft adult contemporary for country music as "Highway 101", but listeners reacted negatively to what turned out to be a stunt. WMGI then switched to contemporary hit radio as "100.7 Mix FM", with Beau Richards as program director and morning co-host; the first song was "What Is Love" by Haddaway. Ratings doubled and WMGI was second to WTHI-FM. In fact, WMGI had an audience of over 70 percent of teenagers. Tom Watson consulted the change. WMGI was the first station to have Kato Kaelin as a guest, on April Fool's Day, at a time when he was still testifying in the O.J. Simpson trial.

== HD Radio ==
WMGI's HD2 channel airs a 1960s-70s oldies format branded as "Superhits." On January 12, 2026, the format began simulcasting on 97.9 W250BZ in Terre Haute, Indiana. That station is now "Superhits 97.9."
