= WEHP (FM) =

Clinton, Indiana; United States
- Broadcast area: Terre Haute, Indiana
- Frequency: 93.7 MHz
- Branding: WEHP 93.7 FM

Programming
- Format: Christian radio

Ownership
- Owner: American Hope Communications, Inc.
- Sister stations: WPFR; WKZI; WLHW

History
- First air date: June 2000
- Former call signs: WPFR (1997–2000); WPFR-FM (2000–2023)
- Former frequencies: 93.9 MHz (2000–2011)

Technical information
- Licensing authority: FCC
- Facility ID: 73712
- Class: A
- ERP: 1,950 watts
- HAAT: 178 meters (584 ft)
- Transmitter coordinates: 39°30′14″N 87°26′37″W

Links
- Public license information: Public file; LMS
- Website: wehp.life

WEHP is a Christian radio station licensed to Clinton, Indiana, transmitting on 93.7 MHz. The station serves the Terre Haute, Indiana, area, and is owned by American Hope Communications. The station began broadcasting in June 2000, and originally on 93.9 MHz. In 2011, the station's frequency was changed to 93.7 MHz. The station was taken off the air in March 2020.

WEHP was originally owned by Word Power, Inc. Effective October 29, 2021, it was sold to American Hope Communications, along with WKZI, WLHW, WPFR 1480 AM, and three translators, for $179,000.
