= WZZQ (FM) =

Radio station in Terre Haute, Indiana, United States (1967–2001)

- Terre Haute, Indiana; United States
- Frequency: 107.5 MHz

Ownership
- Owner: Contemporary Media, Inc.

History
- First air date: September 28, 1967
- Last air date: October 4, 2001
- Former call signs: WBOW-FM (1968–1971, 1971–1974); WHOE (March 22 – September 7, 1971); WBOQ (1974–1982); WZZQ (1982–1995, 2000–2001); WZZQ-FM (1995–2000)

Technical information
- Facility ID: 13729
- ERP: 27,500 watts
- HAAT: 204 meters
- Transmitter coordinates: 39°30′14.4″N 87°26′38.4″W

WZZQ was a radio station on 107.5 FM in Terre Haute, Indiana, United States, which broadcast between 1967 and 2001.

WZZQ went off the air when its licensee, Contemporary Media, Inc., had all of its licenses cancelled in response to a Federal Communications Commission investigation. The frequency remained vacant for nearly 16 years until WYLJ signed on in August 2017.

== History ==
The station signed on September 28, 1967, as WBOW-FM, companion to WBOW (1230 AM). The station would be co-owned with WBOW for the entirety of its existence. It was the second attempt by WBOW at establishing a presence on the FM dial. The first WBOW-FM had signed on in December 1947 on 101.1 MHz, beating WTHI-FM by a month. This station disappeared on June 19, 1956, when the Federal Communications Commission (FCC) granted a request to cancel the license and delete the call letters.

In its first six years on the air, the new WBOW-FM was a simulcast of its AM counterpart, though it used the WHOE call letters for six months in 1971. That changed on February 1, 1974, when WBOW-FM became WBOQ "Alternative Radio" with a format described as freeform but middle-of-the-road. Later in the 1970s, WBOQ became a country music station.

In 1982, then-WBOW and WBOQ were sold to Contemporary Media, Inc., headed by Michael S. Rice. WBOQ was relaunched as a rock station, WZZQ, on June 15 of that year. Ten years later, in 1992, WZZQ became a rock-leaning CHR station. Between 1995 and 2001, it simulcast on 1230 AM, which from 1995 to 2000 also took on the WZZQ call letters.

The president of Contemporary Media was Michael S. Rice. In 1994, Rice was convicted of sexually abusing five teenage boys in Missouri. The next year, the FCC opened a hearing to revoke the licenses of all of the stations owned by Contemporary Media and its sister companies, Contemporary Broadcasting and Lake Broadcasting, which also owned FM stations in Columbia and Eldon, Missouri, as well as two additional unbuilt stations in the same state.

In 1997, an FCC administrative law judge ruled that the licenses should be revoked. The FCC affirmed the decision in March 1998. Rice appealed, losing in federal appeals court. In March 2001, the Supreme Court refused to hear the case. All Contemporary stations ceased operations by FCC order on October 4, 2001.
