= Nucular =

Common, prescribed-against pronunciation of "nuclear"

Nucular is a common, proscribed pronunciation of the word nuclear. It is a rough phonetic spelling of /ˈnjuːkjələr/. The Oxford English Dictionary's entry dates the word's first published appearance to 1943.

== Dictionary notes ==
This is one of two contentious pronunciations that receive particular mention in the FAQ of the Merriam-Webster Dictionary:

Though disapproved of by many, pronunciations ending in \-kyə-lər\ have been found in widespread use among educated speakers, including scientists, lawyers, professors, congressmen, United States cabinet members, and at least two United States presidents and one vice president. While most common in the United States, these pronunciations have also been heard from British and Canadian speakers.

The American Heritage Dictionary notes:

The pronunciation (noo'kyə-lər), which is generally considered incorrect, is an example of how a familiar phonological pattern can influence an unfamiliar one ... [since] much more common is the similar sequence (-kyə-lər), which occurs in words like particular, circular, spectacular, and in many scientific words like molecular, ocular, and vascular.

The Oxford English Dictionary notes:

The colloquial pronunciation British /ˈnjuːkjʊlə/, U.S. /ˈn(j)ukjələr/ (frequently rendered in written form as nucular[...]) has been criticized in usage guides since at least the mid 20th century [...] although it is now commonly given as a variant in modern dictionaries.

In his 1999 book The Big Book of Beastly Mispronunciations, logophile Charles Harrington Elster wrote that the vast majority of those he spoke to while writing his book as well as 99% of the 1985 usage panel of Morris & Morris's Harper Dictionary of Contemporary Usage specifically condemned the use of the word and characterized it as a mispronunciation. Elster's own view on the matter derives from the root of the word: "nucleus". Arguing by analogy, Elster suggests that "Molecular comes from molecule, and particular comes from particle, but there is no nucule to support nucular."

== Notable users ==
The U.S. presidents Dwight D. Eisenhower, Bill Clinton, George W. Bush and vice president Walter Mondale used this pronunciation. In his 2005 book Going Nucular, linguist Geoffrey Nunberg suggested that the presidents' reasons for their differing pronunciations may be distinct. Whereas Eisenhower's pronunciation most likely arose from lack of familiarity (he first learned the word in midlife), Bush's usage may represent a calculated effort to appeal to populist sentiment, though Nunberg's theory here is rejected by linguist Steven Pinker. This analysis is repeated in the second edition of Elster's Big Book of Beastly Mispronunciations.

Oxford professor Marcus du Sautoy used this pronunciation in a BBC documentary.

The nuclear physicist Edward Teller, "father" of the American hydrogen bomb, supposedly used "nucular", and it does have some currency in the American nuclear research establishment. But in a 1965 interview on Project Plowshare, Teller used the standard pronunciation.

The 17th U.S. Secretary of Energy, Chris Wright, said "nucular" several times in his welcome remarks on February 5, 2025.

== Motivation ==
Pinker has proposed a phonotactic explanation for the conversion of nuclear to nucular: the unusual and disfavored sequence [kli.ər] is gradually transformed to a more acceptable configuration via metathesis. But Arnold Zwicky notes that [kli.ər] presents no difficulty for English speakers in words such as pricklier and deems the postulation of metathesis unnecessary. He suggests a morphological origin, combining the slang nuke with the common sequence -cular (molecular, particular, etc.). Supporting Zwicky's hypothesis, Geoffrey Nunberg quotes a government weapons specialist: "Oh, I only say 'nucular' when I'm talking about nukes." Nunberg argues that this pronunciation by weapons specialists and by politicians such as Bush may be a deliberate choice. He suggests that the reasons for this choice are to assert authority or to sound folksy.

== See also ==
- Bushism
- Political gaffe
