= Metathesis (linguistics) =

Switching the order of sounds

Metathesis (/məˈtæθəsɪs/ mə-TATH-ə-siss; from Greek μετάθεσις, from μετατίθημι "to put in a different order") is the transposition of sounds or syllables in a word or of words in a sentence. Most commonly, it refers to the interchange of two or more contiguous segments or syllables, known as adjacent metathesis or local metathesis:

- anemone > **anenome (onset consonants of adjacent syllables)
- cavalry > **calvary (codas of adjacent syllables)

Metathesis may also involve interchanging non-contiguous sounds, known as nonadjacent metathesis, long-distance metathesis, or hyperthesis, as shown in these examples of metathesis sound change from Latin to Spanish:

- Latin parabola > Spanish palabra "word"
- Latin miraculum > Spanish milagro "miracle"
- Latin periculum > Spanish peligro "danger, peril"
- Latin crocodilus > Spanish cocodrilo "crocodile"

Many languages have words that show this phenomenon, and some even use it as a regular part of their grammar, such as Hebrew and Fur. The process of metathesis has altered the shape of many familiar words in English as well.

The original form before metathesis may be deduced from older forms of words in the language's lexicon or, if no forms are preserved, from phonological reconstruction. In some cases it is not possible to settle with certainty on the original version.

== Rhetorical metathesis ==
Dionysius of Halicarnassus was a historian and scholar in rhetoric living in 1st century BC Greece. He analysed classical texts and applied several revisions to make them sound more eloquent. One of the methods he used was re-writing documents on a mainly grammatical level: changing word and sentence orders would make texts more fluent and "natural", he suggested. He called this way of re-writing metathesis.

== Examples ==
=== American Sign Language ===
In American Sign Language, several signs which have a pre-specified initial and final location in reference to the body of the person signing (such as the signs RESTAURANT, PARENT, or TWINS) can have the order of these two locations reversed in contexts which seem to be purely phonological. While not possible with all signs, this does happen with quite a few. For example, the sign DEAF, prototypically made with the "1" handshape making contact first with the cheek and then moving to contact the jaw (as in the sentence FATHER DEAF), can have these locations reversed if the preceding sign, when part of the same constituent, has a final location more proximal to the jaw (as in the sentence MOTHER DEAF). Both forms of the sign DEAF are acceptable to native signers. A proposed prerequisite for metathesis to apply in ASL is that both signs must be within the same region on the body. Constraints on the applications of metathesis in ASL has led to discussions that the phonology breaks down the body into regions distinct from settings.

=== Amharic ===
Amharic has a few minor patterns of metathesis, as shown by Wolf Leslau. For example, "matches" [kəbrit] is sometimes pronounced as [kərbit], [mogzit] "nanny" is sometimes pronounced as [mozgit]. The word "Monday" is [säɲo], which is the base for "Tuesday" [maksäɲo], which is often metathesized as [maskäɲo]. All of these examples show a pair of consonants reversed so that the stop begins the next syllable.

=== Azerbaijani ===
Metathesis among neighbouring consonants happens very commonly in Azerbaijani:

- köprü > körpü "bridge"
- yapraq > yarpaq "leaf"
- topraq > torpaq "soil"
- tütsü > tüstü "smoke"

=== Basque ===
The phenomenon is quite common dialectally.

-euskara (Southern dialects, Standard Basque) vs. eskuara (Navarro-Labourdin dialect), meaning "Basque language").

-lukete (Standard Basque, Northern dialects) vs. luteke (Navarrese dialect), conditional non-past auxiliary transitive verb, as in "ikusiko lukete", meaning "they would see it / him / her").

-pertsona ("person", Standard Basque and most dialects) vs. presuna ("Low-Navarrese dialect).

-hodei ("cloud", Standard Basque, Southern dialects) vs. hedoi .. (Northern dialects).

=== Danish ===
Some common nonstandard pronunciations of Danish words employ metathesis:

- billeder > bidler "pictures"
- gennem > gemmen "through"

But metathesis has also historically changed some words:

- kros > kors " (Christian) cross"

=== Egyptian Arabic ===
A common example of metathesis in Egyptian Arabic is when the order of the word's root consonants has changed.

- Classical Arabic zawj > Egyptian Arabic gōz "husband"
- Classical Arabic mil‘aqah > ma‘la’a "spoon"

The following examples of metathesis have been identified in Egyptian Arabic texts, but are not necessarily more common than their etymological spellings:

- Allāh yil‘an > Allāh yin‘al "God curse!"
- fir’a masṛaḥiyyah > fir’a maṛsaḥiyya "theatre troupe"
- falsafah > falfasa "philosophy"

The following loanwords are also sometimes found with metathesis:

- manalog > malanōg "monologue"
- Persian zanjabil > Egyptian Arabic ganzabīl ~ zanzabīl "ginger"
- isbitalya > istibalya "hospital"
- banalti > balanti "penalty" (in football)

The likely cause for metathesis in the word "hospital" is that the result resembles a common word pattern familiar to Arabic speakers (namely a Form X verbal noun).

Perhaps the clearest example of metathesis in Egyptian Arabic is the modern name of the city of Alexandria: (Al-)Iskandariya (الإسكندرية). In addition to the metathesis of x /ks/ to /sk/, the initial Al of Alexandria has been reanalyzed as the Arabic definite article.

=== English ===
Metathesis is responsible for some common speech errors, such as children acquiring spaghetti as pasketti. The word ask has the nonstandard variant ax pronounced /æks/; the spelling ask is found in Shakespeare and in the King James Bible and ax in Chaucer, Caxton, and the Coverdale Bible. The word "ask" derives from Proto-Germanic *aiskōną.

Some other frequent English pronunciations that display metathesis are:

- nuclear > nucular /ˈn(j)uːkjʊlər/ (re-analysed as nuke + -cular suffix in molecular, binocular)
- prescription > perscription /pərˈskrɪpʃən/
- introduce > interduce /ɪntərˈd(j)uːs/
- asterisk > asterix /ˈæstərɪks/
- comfortable > comfturble /ˈkʌm(p)ftərbəl/
- cavalry > calvary /ˈkælvəri/
- iron > iorn /'aɪ.ɚn/
- foliage > foilage /ˈfoɪlɪdʒ/
- aforementioned > afrementioned /ˈæfrəˌmɛnʃənd/
- pretty > purty /ˈpɜːrti/
- jewelry > jewlery /'dʒ(j)uːləri/
- animal > aminal /ˈæmɪnəl/

The process has shaped many English words historically. Bird and horse came from Old English bridd and hros; wasp and hasp were also written wæps and hæps.

The Old English beorht underwent metathesis to bryht, which became Modern English bright.

The Old English þrēo "three" formed þridda "third" and þrēotene "thirteen". These underwent metathesis to forms which became Modern English third and thirteen.

The Old English verb wyrċan "to work" had the passive participle ġeworht "worked". This underwent metathesis to wroht, which became Modern English wrought.

The Old English þyrl "hole" underwent metathesis to þryl. This gave rise to a verb þrylian "pierce", which became Modern English thrill, and formed the compound nosþryl "nose-hole" which became Modern English nostril (May have occurred in the early Middle English Period: "nosþyrlu" (c. 1050); "nos-thirlys" (c. 1500). In 1565 "nosthrille" appears; "thirl"/"thurl" survived even longer, until 1878).

Metathesis is also a common feature of the West Country dialects.

=== Finnish ===
In western dialects of Finnish, historical stem-final /h/ has been subject to metathesis (it is lost in standard Finnish). That leads to variant word forms:

- orhi "stallion" (standard *orih > ori)
- sauhu "smoke" (standard *savuh > savu)
- valhe "lie" (standard *valeh > vale)
- venhe "boat" (standard *veneh > vene)

Some words have been standardized in the metathetized form:

- *mureh > murhe "sorrow"
- *pereh > perhe "family"
- *uroh > urho "hero"
- *valehellinen > valheellinen "untrue"

Sporadic examples include the word vihreä "green", which derives from older viherä, and the vernacular change of the word juoheva "jovial" to jouheva (also a separate word meaning "bristly").

=== French ===
Etymological metathesis occurs in the following French words:

- brebis from popular Latin berbex meaning "sheep" (early 12th century).
- fromage from popular Latin formaticus, meaning "formed in a mold" (1135).
- moustique (1654) from French mousquitte (1603) by metathesis. From Spanish mosquito ("little fly").

Deliberate metathesis also occurs extensively in the informal French pattern of speech called verlan (itself an example: verlan < l'envers, meaning "the reverse" or "the inverse"). In verlan new words are created from existing words by reversing the order of syllables. Verlanization is applied mostly to two-syllable words and the new words that are created are typically considerably less formal than the originals, and/or take on a slightly different meaning. The process often involves considerably more changes than simple metathesis of two phonemes but this forms the basis for verlan as a linguistic phenomenon. Some of these words have become part of standard French.

A few well known examples are:

- laisse tomber > laisse béton
- lourd > relou
- louche > chelou
- français > céfran

Some Verlan words are metathesized more than once:

- arabe > beur > rebeu

=== Ancient Greek ===
In Greek, the present stem often consists of the root with a suffix of y (ι˰ in Greek). If the root ends in the vowel a or o, and the consonant n or r, the y exchanges position with the consonant and is written i:

- *cháryō > chaírō "I am glad" — echárē "he was glad"
- *phányō > phaínō "I reveal" — ephánē "he appeared"

For metathesis of vowel length, which occurs frequently in Attic and Ionic Greek, see quantitative metathesis.

=== Hebrew ===
In Hebrew the verb conjugation (binyan) hitpaēl (התפעל) undergoes metathesis if the first consonant of the root is an alveolar or postalveolar fricative. Namely, the pattern hiṯ1a22ē3 (where the numbers signify the root consonants) becomes hi1ta22ē3. Examples:

- No metathesis: root lbš לבש = hitlabbēš הִתְלַבֵּש ("he got dressed").
- Voiceless alveolar fricative: root skl סכל = histakkēl הִסְתַּכֵּל ("he looked [at something]").
- Voiceless postalveolar fricative: root šdl שׁדל = hištaddēl הִשְׁתַּדֵּל ("he made an effort").
- Voiced alveolar fricative: root zqn זקן = hizdaqqēn הִזְדַּקֵּן ("he grew old"); with assimilation of the T of the conjugation.
- Voiceless alveolar affricate: root t͡slm צלם = hit͡stallēm הִצְטַלֵּם ("he had a photograph of him taken"); with assimilation (no longer audible) of the T of the conjugation.

Hebrew also features isolated historical examples of metathesis. For example, the words כֶּֽבֶשׂ keves and כֶּֽשֶׂב kesev (meaning "lamb") both appear in the Torah.

=== Hindustani ===
Like many other natural languages Urdu and Hindi also have metathesis like in this diachronic example:

Sanskrit जन्म (جنمہ) janma /dʒənmə/ > Urdu جنم and Hindi जनम janam /dʒənəm/ "Birth"

More examples

- Portuguese igreja became Urdu (گرجا) and Hindi गिर्जा (girjā), meaning "church"

=== Hungarian ===
In case of a narrow range of Hungarian nouns, metathesis of a h sound and a liquid consonant occurs in nominative case, but the original form is preserved in accusative and other suffixed forms:

- kehely "chalice", but kelyhet (accusative), kelyhem (possessive), kelyhek (plural)
- teher "burden", but terhet (acc.), terhed (poss.), terhek (pl.)
- pehely "flake", but pelyhet (acc.), pelyhe (poss.), pelyhek (pl.)

The other instances are boholy [intestinal] villus/fluff/fuzz/nap vs. bolyhok, moholy vs. molyhos down/pubescence [on plants], and the obsolete vehem animal's fetus (cf. vemhes "pregnant [animal]"). The first of them is often used in the regular form (bolyh).

=== Japanese ===
- /fuiɴki/ for /fuɴiki/ (雰囲気), meaning "atmosphere" or "mood"
- Small children commonly refer to kusuri "medicine" as sukuri.
- arata- "new" contrasts with atarashii "new".

The following are examples of argot used in the entertainment industry.

- /neta/ for /tane/ (種), the former meaning "content [of news article]", "food ingredient", "material (for joke or artwork)", the latter "seed", "species","source"
- /sisu/ for /susi/
- The word for "sorry", gomen, is sometimes inverted to mengo (backslang).

=== Javanese ===
Modern Javanese has some metathesis including changing sounds between Old Javanese to Modern Javanese, or between Standard Modern Javanese to its dialect forms. i.e. Old Javanese "krya" is adopted to Modern Javanese "karya" (work) or "kriya" (handwork), even the original sound must be "kreya".

=== Kildin Sami ===
Metathesis is relatively common in Kildin Sami: some consonant clusters can have a metathetic option, and both forms oftentimes are considered to be equal variants of one another.

- соа̄ввьй ~ соа̄ййв "the South; southern"
- Proto-Samic: *puolvë > пӯллв ~ пӯввл "knee"
- Proto-Samic: *pëlvë > пэ̄ллв ~ пэ̄ввл "cloud"
- Proto-Samic: *(h)uvjë > уввьй ~ уййв "down (soft feathers)"
- Proto-Samic: *āvlē > а̄ввьл ~ а̄лльв "horizontal bar with hooks for hanging a cauldron over a fire"

=== Kurdish ===
In Kurdish no example has been found according to which sounds exchange places and this, in turn, clarifies the claim that metathesis in Kurdish is sporadic and irregular.

- Maktab > Matkap
- Tasbih > tabsih
- tarza > tazra
- qopche > qoch-pe

=== Lakota ===
- The words pȟaŋkéska and kȟaŋpéska are dialectal variants of the same word, meaning "abalone" or "porcelain".
- The word čhuthúhu, meaning "rib," has its origins in čhuté "side of the body" and huhú "bone", but is more commonly metathesized as thučhúhu.

=== Malay (including Malaysian and Indonesian variants) ===
Metathesis from earlier protoform, though not so prevalent in Malay, can still be seen, as in the following:

Proto-Malayo-Polynesian: *uʀsa > rusa "deer"
Proto-Malayo-Polynesian: *qudip > hidup "alive"
Proto-Malayo-Polynesian: *dilaq > lidah "tongue"
Proto-Malayo-Polynesian: *laqia > halia "ginger""

Loanwords can also be products of metathesis. The word tembikai "watermelon" is a metathesis of mendikai borrowed from Tamil: கொம்மட்டிக்காய், romanized: kommaṭṭikkāy.

=== Navajo ===
In Navajo, verbs have (often multiple) morphemes prefixed onto the verb stem. These prefixes are added to the verb stem in a set order in a prefix positional template. Although prefixes are generally found in a specific position, some prefixes change order by the process of metathesis.

For example, prefix a- (3i object pronoun) usually occurs before di-, as in

adisbąąs "I'm starting to drive some kind of wheeled vehicle along" [ < 'a- + di- + sh- + ł + -bąąs].

However, when a- occurs with the prefixes di- and ni-, the a- metathesizes with di-, leading to an order of di- + a- + ni-, as in

diʼnisbąąs "I'm in the act of driving some vehicle [into something] and getting stuck" [ < di-ʼa-ni-sh-ł-bąąs < 'a- + di- + ni- + sh- + ł + -bąąs]

instead of the expected *adinisbąąs (a-di-ni-sh-ł-bąąs) (a- is reduced to -).

=== Prakrit ===
Prakrit lost many of its consonant clusters from Sanskrit to aspirates due to metathesis. Clusters with /h/ also became reversed.

- Sanskrit: hasta → hahta (Note: Reconstructed based on attested terms.) > hatha → hattha "hand"
- Sanskrit: cihna > ciṇha "sign"
- Sanskrit: brāhmaṇa > bāmhaṇa "Brahmin"

=== Proto-Indo-European ===
Metathesis has been used to explain the development of thorn clusters in Proto-Indo-European (PIE). It is hypothesised in the non-Anatolian and non-Tocharian branch, a coronal followed by a dorsal *TK first assimilated to *TsK, and thereafter underwent metathesis to *KTs, so *TK > *TsK > *KTs.

PIE h₂ŕ̥tḱos "bear" (cf. Hittite hartaggas) > *h₂ŕ̥tsḱos > *h₂ŕ̥ḱtsos (cf. Sanskrit ṛ́kṣa, Ancient Greek ἄρκτος)
PIE dʰéǵʰōm "earth" (cf. Hittite tēkan) → zero-grade *dʰǵʰōm > *dʰsǵʰōm > *ǵʰdsʰōm (cf. Sanskrit kṣám, Ancient Greek χθών)

=== Punjabi ===
Punjabi sometimes corrupts loanwords via metathesis:

- Arabic: matlab > matlab > matbal "meaning"

Some dialectal words in Punjabi also form due to metathesis, such as in Malwai:

- tuhāḍā > thauḍā, realised as thoḍā "your"
- tuhānū̃ > thaunū̃, realised as thonū̃ "to ye"

=== Romanian ===
Similar to the French verlan is the Totoiana, a speech form spoken in the village of Totoi in Romania. It consists in the inversion of syllables of Romanian words in a way that results unintelligible for other Romanian speakers. Its origins or original purpose are unknown. Its current use is recreative.

=== Rotuman ===
The Rotuman language of Rotuman Island (a part of Fiji) uses metathesis as a part of normal grammatical structure by inverting the ultimate vowel with the immediately preceding consonant.

=== Slavic languages ===
Regular metathesis of liquid consonants is an important historical change during the development of the Slavic languages: a syllable-final liquid (*r or *l), preceded by a short vowel (*e or *o), metathesized to become syllable-initial. However, the exact outcome of the change varies across the different Slavic languages.

A number of Proto-Indo-European roots indicate metathesis in Slavic forms when compared with other Indo-European languages:

PIE	non-Slavic reflexes	Proto-Slavic	Slavic reflexes
*ǵʰortós	English garden, Latin hortus, Lithuanian gar̃das	*gȏrdъ	Old Church Slavonic градъ (gradŭ), Czech hrad, Polish gród, Kashubian gard, Russian го́род (górod), Serbo-Croatian grȃd
*h₂melǵ-	English milk, Lithuanian melžti	*melko̍	Old Church Slavonic млѣко (mlěko), Czech mléko, Polish mleko, Russian молокó (molokó), Serbo-Croatian mlijéko or mléko
*h₂ermos (*h₂er-)	English arm	*őrmę	Old Church Slavonic рамо (ramo), Czech rameno, Polish ramię, Russian ра́мя (rámja), Serbo-Croatian rȁme

Various sporadic metatheses also occurred in individual Slavic languages: (Note: For a variety of examples see: Franz Miklosich, Vergleichende Lautlehre der slavischen Sprachen. Erster Band: Lautlehre, Wien, 1879, and Rajko Nahtigal, Slovanski jeziki, Ljubljana, 1952, pp. 188–189.)

- Bulgarian га́рван (gárvan) < dialectal га́вран (gávran) < Proto-Slavic *ga̋vornъ ("raven") (Note: For further examples see: Стефан Младенов, История на български език, София, 1979, pp. 161–162.)
- Polish pchła < Proto-Slavic *blъxa̍ ("flea")
- Russian ладо́нь (ladón') < dialectal доло́нь (dolón') < Proto-Slavic *dőlnь ("palm of the hand")
- Serbo-Croatian sȁv < dialectal vȁs < Proto-Slavic *vьśь ("all") (Note: For further examples see: August Leskien, Grammatik der serbo-kroatischen Sprache. 1. Teil: Lautlehre, Stammbildung, Formenlehre, Heidelberg, 1914, pp. 98–99.)
- Slovak hmla, Ukrainian імла́ (imlá) < Proto-Slavic *mьgla̍ ("fog")
- Ukrainian ведмі́дь (vedmíd') < Proto-Slavic *medvě̋dь ("bear") (Note: For further examples see: Юрій Шевельов, Історична фонологія української мови, Харків, 2002, pp. 947–948.)

=== Scots Gaelic ===
Dùn Breatann, the Gaelic name for Dumbarton meaning 'Fort of the Britons' sees 'Breatann' morphing into '-barton' in English.

=== Spanish ===
Old Spanish showed occasional metathesis when phonemes not conforming to the usual euphonic constraints were joined. This happened, for example, when a clitic pronoun was attached to a verb ending: it is attested that forms like dejadle "leave [plural] him" were often metathesized to dejalde (the phoneme cluster /dl/ does not occur elsewhere in Spanish). The Spanish name for Algeria (Argelia) is likely a metathesis of the Arabic name for the territory (al-Jazāʼir).

Lunfardo, an argot of Spanish from Buenos Aires, is fond of vesre, metathesis of syllables. The word vesre itself is an example:

- revés > vesre "back, backwards"

Gacería, an argot of Castile, incorporates metathesized words:

- criba > brica

Some frequently heard pronunciations in Spanish display metathesis:

- calcomanía > calcamonía
- dentífrico > dentrífico
- croqueta > cocreta

=== Straits Salish languages ===
In the Salishan languages Northern Straits and Klallam, metathesis is used as a grammatical device to indicate "actual" aspect. The actual aspect is most often translated into English as a be ... -ing progressive. The actual aspect is derived from the "nonactual" verb form by a CV → VC metathetic process (i.e., consonant metathesizes with vowel). Examples from the Saanich (SENĆOŦEN) dialect of Northern Straits:

T̵X̱ÉT "shove" (nonactual)	→	T̵ÉX̱T "shoving" (actual)
ṮPÉX̱ "scatter" (nonactual)	→	ṮÉPX̱ "scattering" (actual)
T̸L̵ÉQ "pinch" (nonactual)	→	T̸ÉL̵Q "pinching" (actual)

See Montler (1986, 1989, 2015) and Thompson & Thompson (1969) for more information.

=== Swahili ===
In Swahili, some foreign words can undergo metathesis during their importation. For instance, "American" becomes "mmarekani".

=== Telugu ===
From a comparative study of Dravidian vocabularies, one can observe that the retroflex consonants (ʈ, ɖ, ɳ, ɭ, ɻ) and the liquids of the alveolar series (r, ɾ, l) do not occur initially in common Dravidian etyma, but Telugu has words with these consonants at the initial position. It was shown that the etyma underwent a metathesis in Telugu, when the root word originally consisted of an initial vowel followed by one of the above consonants. When this pattern is followed by a consonantal derivative, metathesis has occurred in the phonemes of the root-syllable with the doubling of the suffix consonant (if it had been single); when a vowel derivative follows, metathesis has occurred in the phonemes of the root syllable attended by a contraction of the vowels of root and (derivative) suffix syllables. These statements and the resulting sequences of vowel contraction may be summed up as follows:

Type 1: V^{1}C^{1}-C² > C^{1}V^{1}-C²C²

Type 2: V^{1}C^{1}-V²- > C^{1}V^{1}-

Examples:

- lē = lēta "young, tender" < *eɭa
- rē = rēyi "night" < *ira
- rōlu "mortar" < oral < *ural

=== Turkish ===
Two types of metathesis are observed in Turkish. The examples given are from Anatolian Turkish, though the closely related Azerbaijani language is better known for its metathesis:

- Close type:
  - köprü = körpü "bridge"
  - toprak = torpak "ground"
  - kirpi = kipri "hedgehog"
  - kibrit = kirbit "match"
  - komşu = koşnu "neighbour"
  - kimse = kisme "nobody"
  - bayrak = baryak "flag"
  - ekşi = eşki "sour"
  - yalnız = yanlız "alone"
- Distant type:
  - bulgur = burgul "bulgur"
  - ödünç = öndüç "loan"
  - lanet = nalet "curse"

== In popular culture ==
- Metathesis is described by the character Data in the episode "Hollow Pursuits" in the television series Star Trek: The Next Generation after Captain Picard accidentally addresses Lieutenant Barclay as "Mr. Broccoli".

== See also ==
- Pleophony
- Anagram
- Dyslexia
- Epenthesis
- Quantitative metathesis
- Spoonerism

== General references ==
- Hume, E., & Seyfarth, S. (2019). "Metathesis". In M. Aronoff (ed.), Oxford Bibliographies in Linguistics. New York: Oxford University Press. doi:10.1093/obo/9780199772810-0242.
- Key, T. Hewitt (1854). "On Metathesis" (PDF). Transactions of the Philological Society. 1 (11): 206–216. doi:10.1111/j.1467-968X.1854.tb00767.x.
- Montler, Timothy. (1986). An outline of the morphology and phonology of Saanich, North Straits Salish. Occasional Papers in Linguistics (No. 4). Missoula, Montana: University of Montana Linguistics Laboratory. (Revised version of the author's PhD dissertation, University of Hawaiʻi).
- Thompson, Laurence C.; Thompson, M. Terry (1969). "Metathesis as a grammatical device". International Journal of American Linguistics. 35 (3): 213–219. doi:10.1086/465056. S2CID 143798020.
- Young, Robert W., & Morgan, William Sr. (1987). The Navajo language: A grammar and colloquial dictionary, (rev. ed.). Albuquerque: University of New Mexico Press. ISBN 0-8263-1014-1
