= WBOW (640 AM) =

Radio station in Terre Haute, Indiana, United States (1993–2001)

- Terre Haute, Indiana; United States
- Frequency: 640 kHz

Ownership
- Owner: Contemporary Media, Inc.

History
- First air date: June 9, 1993
- Last air date: October 4, 2001

Technical information
- Facility ID: 14888
- Power: 500 watts (day); 250 watts (night)
- Transmitter coordinates: 39°29′20.4″N 87°25′12″W

WBOW was a radio station on 640 AM in Terre Haute, Indiana, United States, which broadcast between 1993 and 2001.

It was created by the relocation of the intellectual property of WBOW (1230 AM) to a new license on 640 kHz. The station shut down when its licensee, Contemporary Media, Inc., had all of its licenses cancelled in response to a Federal Communications Commission investigation.

== History ==
On June 9, 1993, WBOW and its adult standards format moved from 1230 AM to 640. The lower frequency provided an improved coverage area even with reduced power (500 watts versus 1,000 watts on 1230). At 1230, the station was the first radio station in Terre Haute. A new station, WBFX, debuted on 1230 as WBOW moved to the new 640. Soon after, WBOW moved to a sports/talk format.

=== License cancellation ===
In 1994, Contemporary Media president Michael S. Rice was convicted of sexually abusing five teenagers in Missouri. The next year, the Federal Communications Commission (FCC) opened a hearing to revoke the licenses of all of the stations owned by Contemporary Media and its sister companies, Contemporary Broadcasting and Lake Broadcasting, which also owned FM stations in Columbia, Missouri and Eldon, Missouri, as well as two additional unbuilt stations in the same state.

In 1997, an FCC administrative law judge ruled that the licenses should be revoked. The FCC affirmed the decision in March 1998. Rice appealed, losing in federal appeals court. In March 2001, the Supreme Court refused to hear the case. All Contemporary Media stations ceased operations by FCC order on October 4, 2001.

The WBOW call letters have since been used by several unrelated stations in the Terre Haute area, including the current WBOW (102.7 FM).
