= Second declension =

Declension paradigm in Indo-European

The second declension is a category of nouns in Latin and Greek with similar case formation. In particular, these nouns are thematic, with an original o in most of their forms. In Classical Latin, the short o of the nominative and accusative singular became u.

Both Latin and Greek have two basic classes of second-declension nouns: masculine or feminine in one class, neuter in another. Most words of the former class have -us (Latin) or -ος -os (Greek) in the nominative singular, except for the r-stem nouns in Latin, and the "Attic" declension and contracted declension in Attic Greek (when these groups are considered part of this declension). The latter class, i.e. the neuter nominative/accusative singular, usually ends with -um in Latin and -ον (-on) in Greek, matching the accusative of the former. In Latin, the masculine words of the second declension that end with -us in the nominative case are differently declined from the latter in the vocative case: such words end with -e.

== See also ==
For specifics on the second declension as it appears in Latin and Greek, see the appropriate sections in Latin declension and Ancient Greek nouns.

The Wiktionary appendix Second declension contains more detailed information and full paradigm tables for the Latin second declension.
