= WBOW (1230 AM) =

Radio station in Terre Haute, Indiana (1927–2001)

- Terre Haute, Indiana; United States
- Frequency: 1230 kHz

Ownership
- Owner: Contemporary Media, Inc.

History
- First air date: June 15, 1927
- Last air date: October 4, 2001
- Former call signs: WRPI (1927–1928); WBOW (1928–1993); WBFX (1993–1995); WZZQ (1995–2000); WBUZ (2000–2001)

Technical information
- Facility ID: 13730
- Power: 1,000 watts
- Transmitter coordinates: 39°29′24″N 87°25′4.8″W

WBOW was a radio station on 1230 AM in Terre Haute, Indiana, United States, which broadcast between 1927 and 2001.

In the early 1990s, WBOW's intellectual property moved to a new 640 AM facility. The 1230 AM facility then became WBFX, WZZQ and WBUZ, closing down when its licensee, Contemporary Media, Inc., had all of its licenses cancelled in response to a Federal Communications Commission investigation.

== History ==
=== WBOW ===
WBOW was the first successful radio station in Terre Haute, though it was not the first outright. That distinction belonged to WEAC, a short-lived station owned by Camille C. Baines that broadcast between May 30 and August 1922.

While the station began operations slightly earlier in the year, after a tune-up and frequency change, it formally signed on June 15, 1927, as WRPI, a service of then-Rose Polytechnic Institute, on 1440 kHz. Local listeners and radio manufacturer Carl Stahl contributed the funds to build the station. The next year, after Rose almost shuttered WRPI, the station split from the institute and became commercial WBOW, owned by and named for the Banks of the Wabash Broadcasting Association. Banks of the Wabash also acquired a portable station, KGFO, to join WBOW for the purpose of making remote broadcasts; General Order 40 relocated the station to 1310 kHz later in 1928, and WBOW upgraded from 100 watts to 250 watts in 1936. After two attempts to make frequency changes were denied, WBOW moved to 1200 kHz in 1939 and to 1230 in 1941 with NARBA. In the early days of its existence, entertainer Burl Ives was a staff announcer at WBOW, with game show announcer Jay Stewart also an alumnus of the station.

For years, WBOW was a full-service news and top-40 voice, and often the leading station, in the Terre Haute area. It was long affiliated with NBC radio. The station was sold to Radio WBOW, Inc., in 1957, and the new owners further boosted power to 1,000 watts in 1961. The 1960s also saw WBOW gain an FM counterpart, WBOW-FM 107.5, which would remain co-owned with WBOW for the rest of its history as WBOW-FM, WHOE, WBOQ, and WZZQ. Prior to starting his long tenure as lead play-by-play announcer for the Cleveland Cavaliers Radio Network in 1970, Joe Tait was WBOW's morning host, and later, doubled as station manager. When Tait left for Cleveland, he was succeeded by Don Fischer, who would later go on to be the radio voice of the Indiana Hoosiers.

In its waning years, WBOW flipped to adult standards, and the station became affiliated with the ABC Information network, as well as NBC Talknet.

=== WBFX, WZZQ and WBUZ ===
In 1992, WBOW moved to 640 AM, giving it a better signal and wider coverage. The 1230 frequency became WBFX with an album-oriented rock format, and in 1995, it became WZZQ, simulcasting 107.5 FM. WZZQ became WBUZ in 2000, maintaining the FM simulcast.

=== License cancellation ===
In 1982, then-WBOW and WBOQ were sold to Contemporary Media, Inc. The president of Contemporary Media was Michael S. Rice. In 1994, Rice was convicted of sexually abusing five teenagers in Missouri. The next year, in light of the felony conviction, the Federal Communications Commission opened a hearing to revoke the licenses of all five stations owned by Contemporary Media and its sister companies, Contemporary Broadcasting and Lake Broadcasting, which also owned FM stations in Columbia, Missouri (KFMZ), and Eldon, Missouri (KBMX), as well as two additional unbuilt stations in the same state.

In 1997, an FCC administrative law judge ruled that the licenses should be revoked. The FCC affirmed the decision in March 1998. Rice appealed, losing in federal appeals court. In March 2001, the Supreme Court refused to hear the case. All Contemporary stations ceased operations by FCC order on October 4, 2001. Incidentally, WBUZ was the second station by that call sign to have had its license revoked; another WBUZ in Fredonia, New York, had lost its license in 1991.

=== Reuse of the 1230 frequency ===
On June 14, 2011, the Bott Broadcasting Company obtained the construction permit for 1230 AM in Terre Haute as WYGJ. With three months before the permit was to expire, in March 2014, Bott sold the permit to Midwest to relocate WIBQ from 1300 to 1230.
