= WWVR =

- Paris, Illinois; United States
- Broadcast area: Terre Haute, Indiana
- Frequency: 98.5 MHz
- Branding: 98.5 The River

Programming
- Format: Classic rock
- Affiliations: Indianapolis Colts Radio Network

Ownership
- Owner: Midwest Communications; (Midwest Communications, Inc.)
- Sister stations: WBOW; WMGI; WTHI-FM

History
- First air date: 1952 (as WPRS-FM at 98.3)
- Former call signs: WPRS-FM (1952–1974); WACF (1974–2006); WINH (2006–2009); WIBQ (2009–2014); WBOW (2014–2017)
- Former frequencies: 98.3 MHz (1952–1974)

Technical information
- Licensing authority: FCC
- Facility ID: 51153
- Class: B1
- ERP: 11,500 watts
- HAAT: 145 meters (476 ft)
- Transmitter coordinates: 39°27′28.3″N 87°28′50.4″W

Links
- Public license information: Public file; LMS
- Webcast: Listen Live
- Website: 985theriver.com

WWVR (98.5 FM, "The River") is a radio station broadcasting a classic rock format. Licensed to Paris, Illinois, United States, the station serves the Champaign, Illinois, and Terre Haute, Indiana, areas. The station is owned by Midwest Communications, Inc.
