= Indo-European thematic vowel =

Concept in Indo-European linguistics

In Indo-European studies, a thematic vowel or theme vowel is the vowel *e or *o from ablaut placed before the ending of a Proto-Indo-European (PIE) word. Nouns, adjectives, and verbs in the Indo-European languages with this vowel are thematic, and those without it are athematic. Used more generally, a thematic vowel is any vowel found at the end of the stem of a word.

Outside Indo-European, the term "thematic vowel" is also used in the grammar of Kartvelian languages (see Georgian verb paradigm for more information on thematic vowels).

== Proto-Indo-European ==
PIE verbs and nominals (nouns and adjectives) consist of three parts:

$$\underbrace{\underbrace{\mathrm{root+suffix}}_{\mathrm{stem}} + \mathrm{ending}}_{\mathrm{word}}$$

The thematic vowel, if present, occurs at the end of the suffix (which may include other vowels or consonants) and before the ending:

- *gʷʰér-mo-s 'heat' > Ancient Greek θέρμος (thérmos)
- *bʰér-e-ti '(he) bears' > Sanskrit bhárati, Gothic 𐌱𐌰𐌹𐍂𐌹𐌸 (baíriþ)

Athematic forms, by contrast, have a suffix ending in a consonant, or no suffix at all (or arguably a null suffix):

- *ph₂-tér-s 'father' > English father
- *h₁és-mi '(I) am' > English am

For several reasons, athematic forms are thought to be older, and the thematic vowel was likely an innovation of late PIE: Athematic paradigms (inflection patterns) are more "irregular", exhibiting ablaut and mobile accent, while the thematic paradigms can be seen as a simplification or regularisation of verbal and nominal grammar. In the Anatolian languages, which were the earliest to split from PIE, thematic verbs are rare or absent. Furthermore, during late PIE and in the older daughter languages, a number of athematic forms were replaced by thematic ones, as in prehistoric Greek *thes- 'god' versus *thes-o- > Classical Greek θεός (theós).

The thematic vowel technically belongs to the suffix and not the ending, as each suffix is inherently either thematic or athematic. It is also used in some cases to derive stems from roots directly, acting as a suffix in itself (as in the second example above). However, when considering endings which are different for thematic and athematic inflections, it is generally included in the endings as well; see the section on fusion below.

=== Verbs ===
In verbs, the thematic vowel is *e word-finally or when the following ending begins with a coronal obstruent (*t, *d, *dʰ or *s) and *o otherwise. Here is the present active indicative paradigm of *bʰer- 'carry':

Person	Singular	Dual	Plural
1st	*bʰér-o-h₂	*bʰér-o-wos	*bʰér-o-mos
2nd	*bʰér-e-si	*bʰér-e-tes	*bʰér-e-te
3rd	*bʰér-e-ti	*bʰér-e-tes	*bʰér-o-nti

For comparison, here is an example of an athematic verb, *dewk- 'to draw'. The plural forms ablaut to zero-grade on the root and shift the accent to the ending:

Person	Singular	Dual	Plural
1st	*déwk-mi	*duk-wós	*duk-mós
2nd	*déwk-si	*duk-tés	*duk-té
3rd	*déwk-ti	*duk-tés	*duk-énti

(The first person singular ending is sometimes *-m(i) and sometimes *-h₂, depending on tense, voice and thematicity.)

==== Origin ====
The PIE verb is characterized by two distinct sets of endings: one found in the thematic present and the perfect, and another found in the aorist and the athematic present. The middle endings seem like a mixture of these two. The thematic conjugation was widespread in what Donald Ringe terms "Western Indo-European" (Western IE), i.e. IE excluding Tocharian and especially Anatolian. The biggest problem on the origin of PIE thematic inflection is that the thematic endings have more in common with the PIE perfect (which formally, though not functionally and lexically, corresponds to the ḫi-conjugation in Hittite and other Anatolian languages), and that the actual etymological cognates reconstructed of thematic presents are few among the verbs belonging to the Anatolian ḫi-conjugation. In fact, most of the verbs belonging to the ḫi-conjugation in Anatolian actually have lexical cognates that inflect as athematic verbs in Western IE. All types of verbs belonging to the ḫi-conjugation in Hittite can be shown to have, or to originally have had the ablaut pattern with *o in the singular and the zero-grade in the plural, which is exactly the pattern of the Western PIE perfect.

The thematic presents in Western PIE also do not have quantitative ablaut, which indicates their relatively recent origin. This all has caused some linguists to speculate that perfect and thematic present endings go back to a single Early PIE prototype. According to Matasović, the Early PIE stative (becoming the perfect) is responsible for the original form of the thematic suffix *-o-, while the e-grade form is secondary. Verbs forming the underived thematic presents are overwhelmingly bivalent/transitive, and there are no statives in the Late PIE thematic inflection since all the original Early PIE statives either remained athematic presents, or they became Western PIE perfects. It is also probable that some Early PIE middle verbs also became thematic in the Western PIE period, since they lack middle correspondences in Anatolian.

=== Nouns ===
In nouns, the thematic vowel is almost always *o, and only becomes *e when there is no ending or when followed by *h₂ in the neuter nominative/accusative plural. Here is an example paradigm for *h₂ŕ̥tḱos 'bear', a thematic animate noun, supplemented by the neuter *h₂érh₃trom 'plough' for the nominative/accusative:

Case	Singular	Dual	Plural
Nom.	*h₂ŕ̥tḱ-o-s	*h₂ŕ̥tḱ-o-h₁	*h₂ŕ̥tḱ-o-es
Voc.	*h₂ŕ̥tḱ-e-∅	*h₂ŕ̥tḱ-o-h₁	*h₂ŕ̥tḱ-o-es
Acc.	*h₂ŕ̥tḱ-o-m	*h₂ŕ̥tḱ-o-h₁	*h₂ŕ̥tḱ-o-ns
Nom./acc. neut.	*h₂érh₃-tro-m	*h₂érh₃-tro-ih₁	*h₂érh₃-tre-h₂
Gen.	*h₂ŕ̥tḱ-o-s?		*h₂ŕ̥tḱ-ō-m
Abl.	*h₂ŕ̥tḱ-o-(h₂)at		*h₂ŕ̥tḱ-o-(i)bʰ-
Dat.	*h₂ŕ̥tḱ-o-ei		*h₂ŕ̥tḱ-o-(i)bʰ-
Instr.	*h₂ŕ̥tḱ-o-h₁		*h₂ŕ̥tḱ-o-(i)bʰ-
Loc.	*h₂ŕ̥tḱ-o-i		*h₂ŕ̥tḱ-o-isu

Again, athematic nouns show ablaut and accent shifts, mainly between the "strong" cases (nominative and vocative in all numbers, and accusative singular/dual) and the "weak" cases (all others). A few endings are also different from the thematic paradigm; for example, the nominative/accusative neuter has *-∅ instead of *-m. See Athematic accent/ablaut classes of PIE nouns for examples.

==== Origin ====
There are several theories about the rise of o-stems in PIE nominal inflection. Two are the most prominent:

- o-stems reflect an ergative system that existed in the prehistory of PIE, and
- o-stems arise from pronouns.

===== Ergative theory =====
Pedersen was the first to notice that the subject of the transitive verb looked as if it had the form of the genitive (a sigmatic case) if it were active, and as if it had the form of the instrumental case if it were inactive. Furthermore, the subject and object of intransitive verbs seemed to have the form of the absolutive (i.e. an asigmatic case). This caused an asymmetry between the valencies of transitive and intransitive verbs, summarized in the table below:

Verb	Role	Nominative system	Ergative system
transitive	subject	nominative	ergative
transitive	object	accusative	absolutive
intransitive	subject	nominative	absolutive

This theory was further developed by Beekes and Kortlandt, who assumed that the nominative syntax of old Indo-European languages was formed later and that the case system of the PIE language was primarily based on the ergative syntax. The same ending shared by the nominative and accusative neuter, originally designating inactive nouns, originated from the originally absolutive case, while the ergative was used with the active subject. Beekes claims the sigmatic genitive-ablative developed from the ergative. After the transformation of the ergative system into the nominative system, the form reconstructed as *CC-R-ós became the nominative, a new case of subject. Later what was to become the thematic vowel *-o- spread to other cases as well, giving rise to o-stem inflection.

Similar theories that assume the ergative past of the PIE syntax have been formulated by Gamkrelidze and Ivanov and Schmalstieg.

A related theory that also derives the thematic conjugation from an oblique case form was proposed by Ranko Matasović, who, however, identified the source form as the genitive. Matasović argued that the thematic o-stem nouns were the result of the nominalisation of adjectives, which in turn arose through the reinterpretation as nominative forms of original (attributively used) genitives of athematic (mostly deverbal) root-nouns. For example, the stem *(h)yug-o (cf. Latin iugum) was abstracted from *(H)yug-os, which was originally a genitive of a root noun *(H)yewg-s (cf. Latin coniūx). Thus, a phrase like *uk^{w}sōn yug-os 'ox of yoking' was reinterpreted as 'yoked ox'. This theory, like the previous one, would explain why there is much evidence in favour of original syncretism of the nominative and genitive singular in the o-stems.

===== Pronominal theory =====
According to Jean Haudry o-stems originated from pronouns with a determining function that were suffixed to a nominal base, playing the role of a postpositional article. There exists a number of typological parallels for such a development:

- in Balto-Slavic, where definite adjectives are formed by suffixing the PIE relative pronoun *yo- / *yeh₂.
- modern Balkan and Scandinavian languages, which developed postpositional determination using demonstratives
- mimation and nunation in Semitic languages.

== Developments from thematic and athematic paradigms ==
Thematic and athematic forms were passed on to the daughter languages of Proto-Indo-European. In the most ancient languages, such as Sanskrit and Ancient Greek, the distinction between athematic and thematic nouns and verbs is preserved. In later languages, the thematic versus athematic distinction in nouns was replaced by distinctions between various thematic ("vowel") and athematic ("consonant") declensions, and athematic verbs are typically regarded as irregular.

As a consequence of such language changes, the distribution of thematic and athematic words differs widely in Indo-European languages. Latin, for example, has only very few athematic verbs, while Sanskrit preserves a large number of these. Greek resembles both Sanskrit and Latin in different respects.

=== Fusion ===
Even in ancient languages, the thematic vowel is often indistinguishable from the case ending, because the two have fused together:

- Old Latin sax-o-is > Classical Latin sax-īs, dative plural of sax-u-m (Old Latin sax-o-m) 'stone'
- Homeric θε-ᾱ́-ων (the-ā́-ōn) > Attic θε-ῶν (the-ôn), genitive plural of θε-ᾱ́ (the-ā́) 'goddess'

In Latin, athematic verbs were lost, except for a few, which were considered irregular or adopted into one of the four thematic conjugations:

- s-um, es, es-t, s-umus, es-tis, s-unt (irregular) 'be'
- (ferō,) fer-s, fer-t, (ferimus,) fer-tis, fer-unt (irregular) 'carry'
- (dō,) dā-s, da-t, da-mus, da-tis, da-nt (first conjugation) 'give'

==== Thematic a ====
Although the a of the Greek and Latin first declension was not originally a thematic vowel, it is considered one in Greek and Latin grammar. In both languages, first-declension nouns take some endings belonging to the thematic second declension. An a-stem noun was originally a collective noun suffixed with *-eh₂, the ending of the neuter plural.

*bʰardʰ-éh₂-∅ (no case ending) > Proto-Italic *farβā > Latin barba 'beard'

==== Athematic vowels ====
Sometimes vowels near the end of a noun or verb, where one would expect a thematic vowel, are not actually thematic vowels. Either these vowels are placed after an e or o, or they are on their own.

In both Latin and Greek, there are athematic nouns whose stems end in i or u (with the allophones y or w before vowels). These include Latin nāvis 'ship' and Greek thesis 'placement'; Latin senātus 'council of elders' or 'senate' and Greek basileus 'king'. Because these vowels are not e or o, they are not thematic, and the nouns take the same endings as consonant-stem nouns.

- Latin nāvi-s, senātu-s · rēg-s 'king'
- Greek thesi-s, basileu-s · Arab-s (Araps) 'Arab'

In Latin, there are four conjugations depending on the vowel before the endings (which include the thematic vowel): a, e, none, i. Although all the verbs belonging to these conjugations are thematic, these four vowels are not the thematic vowel of the different declensions: the thematic vowel is an e/o that has either fused with the endings and conjugation vowel or changed to i/u.

In Greek, some of the Latin conjugations are represented by contracted verbs instead, in which the stem vowel contracts with the ending (which includes the thematic vowel). This results in different vowels in the ending from the non-contracted verbs.

- tīmaeis > tīmāis 'you honor'

== Individual languages ==
=== Latin ===
In Latin, nouns of the first, second, fourth, and fifth declensions are considered thematic; the first declension has the theme vowel a, the second o, the fourth u, and the fifth e. Stems with i are treated together with athematic stems in the third declension, as they came to closely resemble one another. Latin verbs are subject to a similar classification: the first conjugation contains vowel stems with a, the second with e, and the fourth with i. There are no Latin verbs with o or u, and very few are athematic, but they are considered irregular verbs.

For example, consider the noun endings of the Latin "first declension" singular of the word rosa 'rose':

Nom.	rosa
Acc.	rosam
Gen.	rosae
Dat.	rosae
Abl.	rosā

The vowel a is prominent in these case endings, so nouns like rosa came to be known as "a-stem" nouns, with a being the "theme vowel," and such a word was later analysed as having a stem containing a root plus a suffix. In fact, philologists now believe that the suffix in PIE was *-eh₂, with a laryngeal that usually became a in the daughter languages.

=== Sanskrit ===
Sanskrit grammar ordains a vikaraṇapratyaya (modificatory affix) between a verbal root and the tense-ending. Thematic verbal roots are those with an -a in the vikaraṇapratyaya, to wit, roots belonging to the 1st, 4th, 6th and 10th conjugation classes.

Among nominals, those with the prātipadika (stem) ending in -a would the thematic nominals by this definition.

=== Ancient Greek ===
==== Verbs ====
The distinction between thematic and athematic stems is especially apparent in the Greek verb; they fall into two classes that are marked by quite different personal endings. Thematic verbs are also called -ω (-ō) verbs in Greek; athematic verbs are -μι (-mi) verbs, after the first person singular present tense ending that each of them uses. The entire conjugation seems to differ quite markedly between the two sets of verbs, but the differences are really the result of the thematic vowel reacting (fusing) with the verb endings, apart from the first person singular which already had different endings for thematic and athematic verbs in PIE. In classical Greek, the present tense active endings for athematic verbs are:

-μι, -ς, -σι, -μεν, -τε, -ασι(ν)
(-mi, -s, -si, -men, -te, -asi(n))

while the thematic verbs took the endings:

-ω, -εις, -ει, -ομεν, -ετε, -ουσι(ν)
(-ō, -eis, -ei, -omen, -ete, -ousi(n))

In Greek, athematic verbs, except for those that end in -νῡμι -nūmi, are a closed class of inherited forms from PIE.

==== Nouns ====
Greek preserves thematic nouns in the first (or alpha) declension and second (or omicron) declension, and athematic nouns in the third declension.

Declension of the athematic noun πούς (poús) 'foot':

	Attic form	Reconstructed form before δσ > σ (ds > s)
Nom.	πούς (poús)	*πόδ-ς (*pód-s)
Gen.	ποδός (podós)	ποδ-ός (pod-ós)
Dat.	ποδί (podí)	ποδ-ί (pod-í)
Acc.	πόδα (póda)	πόδ-α (pód-a) < *πόδ-m̥ (*pód-m̥)
Voc.	πούς (poús)	*πόδ-ς (*pód-s)

Declension of the thematic noun ἄνθρωπος (ánthropos) 'human':

Nom.	ἄνθρωπ-ος (ánthrōp-os)
Gen.	ἀνθρώπ-ου (anthrṓp-ou)
Dat.	ἀνθρώπ-ῳ (anthrṓp-ōi)
Acc.	ἄνθρωπ-ον (ánthrōp-on)
Voc.	ἄνθρωπ-ε (ánthrōp-e)

=== Other languages ===
Most other Indo-European languages have similar distinctions, or had them in their past. Marked contrasts between thematic and athematic verbs appear in Lithuanian, and Old Church Slavonic. In the Germanic and Insular Celtic languages, the theme vowels are often hard to perceive because of the loss of final vowels. However, their presence is still felt, in a manner that defines different ways of declining nouns or conjugating verbs, so philologists still occasionally speak of vowel stems and consonant stems in these languages as well.

While Old English still contrasted "vowel stems" (thematic) and "consonant stems" (athematic), this distinction is no longer a meaningful one in Modern English, as in other languages whose morphology has been drastically simplified by analogy.

== Etymology ==
In the term thematic vowel, theme refers to the stem of a word. For example, in the Ancient Greek verb τέμνω (témnō) 'cut', tem- is the root, and temn- is the stem or theme for the present tense. Hence, thematic vowel loosely means "stem vowel".
