= WTHI-FM =

- Terre Haute, Indiana; United States
- Frequency: 99.9 MHz (HD Radio)
- Branding: HI-99 WTHI

Programming
- Format: Country
- Affiliations: Compass Media Networks; Westwood One

Ownership
- Owner: Midwest Communications; (Midwest Communications, Inc.)
- Sister stations: WBOW; WMGI; WWVR

History
- First air date: October 1948
- Call sign meaning: Terre Haute, Indiana (sometimes interpreted as Tony Hulman Incorportated)

Technical information
- Licensing authority: FCC
- Facility ID: 70652
- Class: B
- ERP: 38,000 watts
- HAAT: 145 meters (476 ft)
- Transmitter coordinates: 39°27′28.3″N 87°28′50.4″W

Links
- Public license information: Public file; LMS
- Webcast: Listen live
- Website: www.hi99.com

WTHI-FM (99.9 MHz; "HI-99") is a radio station running a country music format in Terre Haute, Indiana. The station's studios and broadcast tower are located along Ohio Street in downtown Terre Haute. The station is owned by Midwest Communications.

WTHI-FM has led the Terre Haute market ratings for over twenty years. In 2007, the station celebrated 25 years in the country format. Over the years, WTHI has raised more than $1,000,000 for the kids at St. Jude Children's Research Hospital.

WTHI-FM's former studio building, which was shared with sister station WWVR and former sister station WTHI-TV (which was co-owned with WTHI-FM from 1954 to 2005), was demolished in December 2012 to accommodate parking for a new office building constructed behind the former WTHI building and facing Wabash Avenue. The old building was constructed as a garment factory in 1906, but housed WTHI-FM and WTHI-TV from 1954 to 2012. WTHI-FM and WWVR, which were later joined by new acquisitions WFNF and WFNB, moved into their new office building in August 2012; this separated the stations from WTHI-TV, which moved to its own new building (at 800 Ohio Street) in October 2012.
