= Ancient Greek nouns =

In Ancient Greek, all nouns are classified according to grammatical gender (masculine, feminine, neuter) and are used in a number (singular, dual, or plural). According to their function in a sentence, their form changes to one of the five cases (nominative, vocative, accusative, genitive, or dative). The set of forms that a noun will take for each case and number is determined by the declension that it follows.

== Cases ==
The five cases of Ancient Greek each have different functions.

=== Nominative ===
The Ancient Greek nominative, like the Proto-Indo-European nominative, is used for the subject and for things describing the subject (predicate nouns or adjectives):

- Σωκράτης γὰρ σοφὸς ἦν καὶ δίκαιος.

Sōkrátēs gàr sophòs ên kaì díkaios.
"For Socrates was wise and just."

=== Vocative ===
The vocative is used for addressing people or things. It is frequently the same as the nominative in the singular and always the same in the plural.

- ἀληθῆ λέγεις, ὦ Σώκρατες

alēthê légeis, ô Sṓkrates
"What you say is true, Socrates."

=== Accusative ===
The accusative is used for the object of a verb, and also after prepositions. After prepositions it is often used for the destination of motion:

- πέμπουσιν ἐς Κρήτην ἀγγέλους

pémpousin es Krḗtēn angélous
"They send messengers to Crete."

=== Genitive ===
The Ancient Greek genitive can often be translated with the preposition "of" or the English possessive case:

- ἡ τοῦ Καίσαρος γυνή.

hē toû Kaísaros gunḗ.
"The wife of Caesar."

It is also used after prepositions, especially those which mean "from":

- ἀπῆλθεν ἐκ τῆς ἀγορᾶς.

apêlthen ek tês agorâs.
"He went away from the market-place."

=== Dative ===
The Ancient Greek dative corresponds to the Proto-Indo-European dative, instrumental, or locative. When it corresponds to the dative, it expresses the person or thing that is indirectly affected by an action, and can often be translated with the prepositions "to" or "for":

- λέγει τὴν μαντείαν τῷ Σωκράτει.

légei tḕn manteían tôi Sōkrátei.
"He tells the oracle to Socrates."

When the dative corresponds to the Proto-Indo-European instrumental, it expresses the thing with which something is done, and can often be translated by the preposition "with":

- ἔβαλλέ με λίθοις

éballé me líthois
"He was hitting me with stones."

When the dative corresponds to the Proto-Indo-European locative case (this is often the case when it is used with prepositions), it expresses location (sometimes figuratively) or time, and can often be translated by "in", "at", or "on":

- τρίτῳ ἔτει ὡμολόγησαν Ἀθηναίοις.

trítōi étei hōmológēsan Athēnaíois.
"In the third year they came to an agreement with the Athenians."

The dative is also frequently used after prepositions, such as ἐν (en) "in":

- ἐν τῇ μάχῃ ἀπέθανεν.

en têi mákhēi apéthanen.
"He died in the battle."

== Declension ==
declension, meaning	number	strong cases: nominative, accusative	weak cases: genitive, dative
first declension: "gathering, marketplace"	singular	ἀγορᾱ́, ἀγορᾱ́ν agorā́, agorā́n	ἀγορᾶς, ἀγορᾷ agorâs, agorâi
first declension: "gathering, marketplace"	plural	ἀγοραί, ἀγορᾱ́ς agoraí, agorā́s	ἀγορῶν, ἀγοραῖς agorôn, agoraîs
second declension: "god"	singular	θεός, θεόν theós, theón	θεοῦ, θεῷ theoû, theôi
second declension: "god"	plural	θεοί, θεούς theoí, theoús	θεῶν, θεοῖς theôn, theoîs
third declension: "foot"	singular	πούς, πόδα poús, póda	ποδός, ποδί podós, podí
third declension: "foot"	plural	πόδες, πόδας pódes, pódas	ποδῶν, ποσί podôn, posí

=== Accent of strong and weak cases ===
For first- and second-declension nouns accented on the ultima and third-declension nouns with a single-syllable stem, the strong cases (nominative and accusative) have one type of accent, and the weak cases (genitive and dative) have another.

Specifically, the first- and second-declension nouns have acute (´) in the strong cases, but circumflex (ˆ) in the weak cases. Third-declension nouns have the accent on the stem in the strong cases, but the ending in the weak cases.

Both of these patterns can be summarized by a single rule suggested by Paul Kiparsky: pre-ending accent in the strong cases and post-stem accent in the weak cases.

For first- and second-declension nouns, Kiparsky's rule is more complex. The thematic vowel (ο or ᾱ) counts as neither stem nor ending, but alternates between the two depending on which accent is considered. For post-stem accent, it counts as part of the ending; for pre-ending accent, it counts as part of the stem.

==== Greek definite article ====
	ὁ, ἡ, τό "the"								
	singular			dual			plural		
	m.	f.	n.	m.	f.	n.	m.	f.	n.
nominative	ὁ	ἡ	τό	τώ			οἱ	αἱ	τᾰ́
accusative	τόν	τήν	τό	τώ			τούς	τᾱ́ς	τᾰ́
genitive	τοῦ	τῆς	τοῦ	τοῖν			τῶν		
dative	τῷ	τῇ	τῷ	τοῖν			τοῖς	ταῖς	τοῖς

=== First declension ===
The first declension or alpha declension is considered thematic, with long alpha (ᾱ) at the end of the stem, though it is derived from original athematic Indo-European forms. In Attic Greek, this changes to η everywhere except after ε, ι or ρ. The first declension includes mostly feminine nouns, but also a few masculine nouns, including agent nouns in -της, patronyms in -ίδης, and demonyms.

The first-declension genitive plural always takes a circumflex on the last syllable. In Homeric Greek the ending was -ᾱ́ων or -έων (through shortening from *-ηων). -έων was contracted to -ῶν in Attic.

==== Feminine long a-stem ====
	feminine: ἡ											
	ᾱ									η		
	χώρα "country"			θεά "goddess"			οἰκία "house"			φωνή "voice"		
	sg.	du.	pl.	sg.	du.	pl.	sg.	du.	pl.	sg.	du.	pl.
nominative	χώρᾱ	χώρᾱ	χῶραι	θεᾱ́	θεᾱ́	θεαί	οἰκίᾱ	οἰκίᾱ	οἰκίαι	φωνή	φωνᾱ́	φωναί
vocative	χώρᾱ	χώρᾱ	χῶραι	θεᾱ́	θεᾱ́	θεαί	οἰκίᾱ	οἰκίᾱ	οἰκίαι	φωνή	φωνᾱ́	φωναί
accusative	χώρᾱν	χώρᾱ	χώρᾱς	θεᾱ́ν	θεᾱ́	θεᾱ́ς	οἰκίᾱν	οἰκίᾱ	οἰκίᾱς	φωνήν	φωνᾱ́	φωνᾱ́ς
genitive	χώρᾱς	χώραιν	χωρῶν	θεᾶς	θεαῖν	θεῶν	οἰκίᾱς	οἰκῐ́αιν	οἰκιῶν	φωνῆς	φωναῖν	φωνῶν
dative	χώρᾳ	χώραιν	χώραις	θεᾷ	θεαῖν	θεαῖς	οἰκίᾳ	οἰκῐ́αιν	οἰκίαις	φωνῇ	φωναῖν	φωναῖς

==== Feminine short a-stem ====
Some nouns have short ᾰ in the nominative, vocative and accusative singular, but are otherwise identical to other feminine first-declension nouns. They are recessively accented, i.e. the accent retreats as far left as the rules of Greek accentuation allow.

Most nouns in this category were formed with the suffix *-ya (sometimes written -ι̯ᾰ). The *y (representing the semivowel [j]) undergoes one of several sound changes with the consonant at the end of the stem:

- *glōkʰ-ya > γλῶσσᾰ, Attic γλῶττᾰ "tongue" (palatalization; compare γλωχῑν "point")
- *mor-ya > μοῖρᾰ "portion" (metathesis; compare μόρος)
- *gepʰur-ya > γέφῡρᾰ "bridge" (compensatory lengthening of υ after loss of ι̯)
- PIE *n̥-leh₂dʰ-es-ya > Proto-Greek *ə-lātʰeh-ya > *a-lātʰeyya > Attic Greek ἀλήθειᾰ "truth" (assimilation of *h to *y; compare ἀληθές "something true")

	feminine: ἡ					
	ᾱ			η		
	ἀλήθεια (ᾰ-) "truth"			γλῶσσα (ᾰ-) "tongue"		
	sg.	du.	pl.	sg.	du.	pl.
nominative	ἀλήθειᾰ	ἀληθείᾱ	ἀλήθειαι	γλῶσσᾰ	γλώσσᾱ	γλῶσσαι
vocative	ἀλήθειᾰ	ἀληθείᾱ	ἀλήθειαι	γλῶσσᾰ	γλώσσᾱ	γλῶσσαι
accusative	ἀλήθειᾰν	ἀληθείᾱ	ἀληθείᾱς	γλῶσσᾰν	γλώσσᾱ	γλώσσᾱς
genitive	ἀληθείᾱς	ἀληθείαιν	ἀληθειῶν	γλώσσης	γλώσσαιν	γλωσσῶν
dative	ἀληθείᾳ	ἀληθείαιν	ἀληθείαις	γλώσσῃ	γλώσσαιν	γλώσσαις

==== Masculine a-stem ====
Masculine first-declension nouns end in -ᾱς or -ης in Attic. Homer retains the older masculine ending -ᾱ and uses ναύτᾱ "sailor" instead of ναύτᾱς or ναύτης: compare Latin nauta.

The masculine genitive singular ending comes from the second declension. Homeric Greek uses -ᾱο or -εω.

	masculine: ὁ					
	ᾱς			ης		
	νεᾱνίᾱς "young man"			ποιητής "creative artist"		
	sg.	du.	pl.	sg.	du.	pl.
nominative	νεᾱνίᾱς	νεᾱνῐ́ᾱ	νεᾱνίαι	ποιητής	ποιητᾱ́	ποιηταί
vocative	νεᾱνίᾱ	νεᾱνῐ́ᾱ	νεᾱνίαι	ποιητᾰ́	ποιητᾱ́	ποιηταί
accusative	νεᾱνίᾱν	νεᾱνῐ́ᾱ	νεᾱνίᾱς	ποιητήν	ποιητᾱ́	ποιητᾱ́ς
genitive	νεᾱνίου	νεᾱνῐ́αιν	νεᾱνιῶν	ποιητοῦ	ποιηταῖν	ποιητῶν
dative	νεᾱνίᾳ	νεᾱνῐ́αιν	νεᾱνίαις	ποιητῇ	ποιηταῖν	ποιηταῖς

=== Second declension ===
The second or omicron declension is thematic, with an -ο or -ε at the end of the stem. It includes one class of masculine and feminine nouns and one class of neuter nouns.

When a second-declension noun is accented on the ultima, the accent switches between acute for the nominative, accusative, and vocative, and circumflex for the genitive and dative. The only exceptions are Attic-declension and contracted nouns.

==== Masculine and feminine o-stems ====
Masculine and feminine both end in -ος, and can only be distinguished by an article or adjective.

	masculine: ὁ			feminine: ἡ		
	ἄνθρωπος "person"			ὁδός "way"		
	sg.	du.	pl.	sg.	du.	pl.
nominative	ἄνθρωπος	ἀνθρώπω	ἄνθρωποι	ὁδός	ὁδώ	ὁδοί
vocative	ἄνθρωπε	ἀνθρώπω	ἄνθρωποι	ὁδέ	ὁδώ	ὁδοί
accusative	ἄνθρωπον	ἀνθρώπω	ἀνθρώπους	ὁδόν	ὁδώ	ὁδούς
genitive	ἀνθρώπου	ἀνθρώποιν	ἀνθρώπων	ὁδοῦ	ὁδοῖν	ὁδῶν
dative	ἀνθρώπῳ	ἀνθρώποιν	ἀνθρώποις	ὁδῷ	ὁδοῖν	ὁδοῖς

==== Neuter o-stems ====
In the neuter, the nominative, vocative and accusative are the same, with a singular in -ον and plural in -ᾰ. Other forms are identical to the masculine and feminine second declension.

	neuter: τό		
δῶρον "gift"
	sg.	du.	pl.
nominative	δῶρον	δώρω	δῶρᾰ
vocative	δῶρον	δώρω	δῶρᾰ
accusative	δῶρον	δώρω	δῶρᾰ
genitive	δώρου	δώροιν	δώρων
dative	δώρῳ	δώροιν	δώροις

==== Attic declension ====
In the Attic dialect, some masculine second-declension nouns and some adjectives have endings with lengthened vowels. Some nouns in this category end in -εως, which developed from an original *-ηος by the process of quantitative metathesis (switching of vowel lengths). All second-declension endings containing ο were transformed:

- ο, ου → ω
- οι → ῳ

The placement of the accent does not change, even when the ultima is long, and all forms take an acute instead of a circumflex.

In these nouns, the nominative singular, vocative singular, and accusative plural are identical, as are the accusative singular and genitive plural, and the dative singular and nominative and vocative plural.

	masculine		
λεώς "people"
	sg.	du.	pl.
nominative	λεώς	λεώ	λεῴ
vocative	λεώς	λεώ	λεῴ
accusative	λεών	λεώ	λεώς
genitive	λεώ	λεῴν	λεών
dative	λεῴ	λεῴν	λεῴς

==== Contracted second declension ====
In Attic, nouns and adjectives ending in -εος or -οος and -εον or -οον are contracted so that they end in -ους and -ουν.

When the ultima is accented, it takes a circumflex in all forms, including the nominative, accusative, and vocative.

	masculine		
νοῦς "mind"
	sg.	du.	pl.
nominative	νοῦς	νώ	νοῖ
vocative	νοῦ	νώ	νοῖ
accusative	νοῦν	νώ	νοῦς
genitive	νοῦ	νοῖν	νῶν
dative	νῷ	νοῖν	νοῖς

=== Third declension ===
The third declension group includes masculine, feminine and neuter nouns. It is an athematic declension that lacks the standard thematic vowels of the two thematic declensions above. This results in varied and often complex phonemic interactions between stem and ending, especially so between adjacent consonants, that often make these nouns appear to be highly irregular compared to their straightforward thematic counterparts.

These nouns in the nominative singular end with the vowels α, ι, υ, ω or with the consonants ν, ρ, ς (ξ, ψ). They form the genitive case with -ος, -ως or -ους.

Third-declension nouns have one, two, or three stems, unlike first- and second-declension nouns, which always have only one stem. Each stem is used in different case-and-number forms. In nouns with two stems, the stem with the long vowel is called the strong stem, while the stem with the short vowel is called the weak stem. The strong stem is found at the nominative singular, and the weak stem in the genitive singular.

- ἡγεμών (long vowel, strong stem: nominative singular)
  ἡγεμόνος (short vowel, weak stem: genitive singular)

==== Endings ====
The masculine and feminine nominative singular ordinarily ends in -ς, but has no ending in some nouns whose stems end in -ν- and -ντ-, and all nouns in -ρ: ἡγεμών, ἀκτίς (from *ἀκτίν-ς), γέρων (from *γέρωντ), γίγας (from *γίγαντ-ς), ῥήτωρ. The neuter nominative, accusative, and vocative singular always has no ending.

The α of the accusative singular and plural was originally a syllabic ν. The accusative singular ending -α appears after Proto-Greek consonants, and is much more common than -ν, because almost all third-declension stems end in a consonant. When a Proto-Greek consonant was lost (ϝ, ι̯, σ), -α appears after a vowel, and may be lengthened to ᾱ: βασιλέᾱ. The ending ν appears after the vowels υ and ι: ἰσχύν, πόλιν. The ending -νς always changes to -ας, except in the accusative plural of ἰχθύς, where it lengthens the preceding υ by compensatory lengthening, yielding ἰχθῦς.

A peculiar subset of this declension is used when declining foreign masculine names such as Ἰησοῦς, Ἰούδᾱς, Λευῑ́(ς): the nominative takes a sigma, the genitive and vocative are the bare stem, the dative may receive an iota subscript if possible, the accusative receives a nu. However, other nouns in which the cluster arising with the sigma at nominative would be un-Greek (e.g. Γολιάθ) are instead kept undeclined.

	singular		dual	plural	
	masculine/ feminine	neuter	dual	masculine/ feminine	neuter
nominative	-ς, —_	—_	-ε	-ες	-ᾰ
vocative	—_, -ς	—_	-ε	-ες	-ᾰ
accusative	-ᾰ, -ν	—_	-ε	-ᾰς, -νς	-ᾰ
genitive	-ος		-οιν	-ων	
dative	-ι		-οιν	-σι(ν)	

==== Consonant-stems ====
These nouns end in -ν, -ρ, -ς (-ξ, -ψ). Based on the last letter of the stem, they are divided into two categories:

The mute-stem nouns have stems ending in -κ-, -γ-, -χ- (velar-stem nouns), -π-, -β-, -φ- (labial-stem nouns), -τ-, -δ-, -θ- (dental-stem nouns).

The semi mute-stem nouns have stems ending in -ν- (nasal-stem nouns), -λ-, -ρ- (liquid-stem nouns), -σ- (sibilant-stem nouns).

Nominative singular -ς and dative plural -σι cause pronunciation or spelling changes, depending on the consonant at the end of the stem.

	consonant at end of stem	nominative singular, dative plural
(dental)	(τ, δ, θ)	-ς, -σι
velar	κ, γ, χ	-ξ, -ξι
labial	π, β, φ	-ψ, -ψι

===== Velar- and labial-stems =====
In the nominative singular and dative plural, the velars κ, γ, χ combined with σ are written as ξ, and the labials π, β, φ combined with σ are written as ψ.

	masc.					
	κόραξ "raven"			γῡ́ψ "vulture"		
	sg.	du.	pl.	sg.	du.	pl.
nominative	κόραξ	κόρᾰκε	κόρακες	γῡ́ψ	γῦπε	γῦπες
vocative	κόραξ	κόρᾰκε	κόρακες	γῡ́ψ	γῦπε	γῦπες
accusative	κόρακα	κόρᾰκε	κόρακας	γῦπα	γῦπε	γῦπας
genitive	κόρακος	κορᾰ́κοιν	κοράκων	γῡπός	γῡποῖν	γῡπῶν
dative	κόρακι	κορᾰ́κοιν	κόραξι	γῡπί	γῡποῖν	γῡψί

===== Dental- and nasal-stems =====
====== Stems in t ======
In the nominative singular and dative plural, a dental τ, δ, θ before σ is lost: τάπης, not τάπητς.

	masc.		
τάπης "rug"
	sg.	du.	pl.
nominative	τάπης	τᾰ́πητε	τάπητες
vocative	τάπης	τᾰ́πητε	τάπητες
accusative	τάπητα	τᾰ́πητε	τάπητας
genitive	τάπητος	τᾰπήτοιν	ταπήτων
dative	τάπητι	τᾰπήτοιν	τάπησι

If a noun is not accented on the last syllable and ends in -ις, -ης, or -υς, it often has an accusative singular in -ν and a vocative with no ending.

- ἡ χάρις, Πάρνης, κόρυς
  τὴν χάριν, Πάρνην, κόρυν (accusative)
  ὦ χάρι, Πάρνη, κόρυ (vocative)

====== Single-stems in nt ======
In the nominative singular and dative plural, ντ before σ is lost, and the previous vowel is lengthened by compensatory lengthening. In the vocative singular, final -τ is lost, as Ancient Greek words cannot end in stops.

	masc.		
γίγᾱς "giant"
	sg.	du.	pl.
nominative	γίγᾱς	γίγαντε	γίγαντες
vocative	γίγαν	γίγαντε	γίγαντες
accusative	γίγαντα	γίγαντε	γίγαντας
genitive	γίγαντος	γιγάντοιν	γιγάντων
dative	γίγαντι	γιγάντοιν	γίγᾱσι

When a noun is accented on the last syllable, the vocative singular is identical to the nominative:

- ὁ ἱμάς "leather strap"
  ὦ ἱμάς (vocative)

====== Double-stems in nt ======
These nouns have a weak stem in -οντ- and a strong stem in -ωντ-. The strong stem is used only in the nominative singular. The vocative singular is the weak stem without an ending. In both the nominative and vocative singular, the final τ disappears. In the dative plural, the σ in the ending causes the ντ to disappear, and the ο is lengthened to ου by compensatory lengthening.

	masc.		
γέρων "old man"
	sg.	du.	pl.
nominative	γέρων	γέροντε	γέροντες
vocative	γέρον	γέροντε	γέροντες
accusative	γέροντα	γέροντε	γέροντας
genitive	γέροντος	γερόντοιν	γερόντων
dative	γέροντι	γερόντοιν	γέρουσι

====== Stems in at ======
In these nouns, the stem originally ended in -ν̥τ- (with syllabic n), which changed to -ατ- in Greek. In the nominative singular, the final -τ disappeared.

	neut.		
κτῆμα "property"
	sg.	du.	pl.
nominative	κτῆμα	κτήμᾰτε	κτήματα
vocative	κτῆμα	κτήμᾰτε	κτήματα
accusative	κτῆμα	κτήμᾰτε	κτήματα
genitive	κτήματος	κτημᾰ́τοιν	κτημάτων
dative	κτήματι	κτημᾰ́τοιν	κτήμασι

====== Single-stems in an, en, in, on ======
Some nouns have stems ending in -ν-. The nominative singular may end in -ς, causing compensatory lengthening, or have no ending.

	fem.		
ἀκτίς beam
	sg.	du.	pl.
nominative	ἀκτῑ́ς	ἀκτῖνε	ἀκτῖνες
vocative	ἀκτῑ́ς	ἀκτῖνε	ἀκτῖνες
accusative	ἀκτῖνα	ἀκτῖνε	ἀκτῖνας
genitive	ἀκτῖνος	ἀκτῑ́νοιν	ἀκτίνων
dative	ἀκτῖνι	ἀκτῑ́νοιν	ἀκτῖσι

====== Double-stems in en, on ======
Some nouns have a strong stem in -ην-, -ων- and a weak stem in -εν-, -ον-. The nominative singular is the only form with the strong stem. Nouns of this class that are not accented on the last syllable use the weak stem without an ending for the vocative singular.

- ὁ γείτων "neighbour"
  ὦ γεῖτον (vocative)

	masc.			fem.		
	ἡγεμών "leader"			ἀδήν "gland"		
	sg.	du.	pl.	sg.	du.	pl.
nominative	ἡγεμών	ἡγεμόνε	ἡγεμόνες	ἀδήν	ᾰ̓δένε	ἀδένες
vocative	ἡγεμών	ἡγεμόνε	ἡγεμόνες	ἀδήν	ᾰ̓δένε	ἀδένες
accusative	ἡγεμόνα	ἡγεμόνε	ἡγεμόνας	ἀδένα	ᾰ̓δένε	ἀδένας
genitive	ἡγεμόνος	ἡγεμόνοιν	ἡγεμόνων	ἀδένος	ᾰ̓δένοιν	ἀδένων
dative	ἡγεμόνι	ἡγεμόνοιν	ἡγεμόσι	ἀδένι	ᾰ̓δένοιν	ἀδέσι

===== Liquid-stems =====
Liquid-stems have stems ending in -λ- or -ρ-. Unlike mute-stems, these nouns do not change in spelling or pronunciation when the dative plural ending -σι is added.

====== Single-stems in er, or ======
Some nouns end in -ηρ, -ωρ and take the endings without any sound changes.

	masc.		
κλητήρ "usher"
	sg.	du.	pl.
nominative	κλητήρ	κλητῆρε	κλητῆρες
vocative	κλητήρ	κλητῆρε	κλητῆρες
accusative	κλητῆρα	κλητῆρε	κλητῆρας
genitive	κλητῆρος	κλητήροιν	κλητήρων
dative	κλητῆρι	κλητήροιν	κλητῆρσι

====== Double-stems in er, or ======
Some nouns have a nominative singular in -ηρ, -ωρ. The stem for the rest of the forms ends in -ερ-, -ορ-. Nouns in this class that are not accented on the last syllable use the weak stem without an ending for the vocative singular.

	masc.		
ῥήτωρ "orator"
	sg.	du.	pl.
nominative	ῥήτωρ	ῥήτορε	ῥήτορες
vocative	ῥῆτορ	ῥήτορε	ῥήτορες
accusative	ῥήτορα	ῥήτορε	ῥήτορας
genitive	ῥήτορος	ῥητόροιν	ῥητόρων
dative	ῥήτορι	ῥητόροιν	ῥήτορσι

====== Triple-stems in er ======
Some nouns have a strong stem in -ηρ in the nominative singular, a middle stem in -ερ- in other forms, and a weak stem in -ρ(α)- in yet other forms. The α in the dative plural was added for ease of pronunciation; the original form ended in -ρσι.

These include ὁ πατήρ "father", ἡ μήτηρ "mother", ἡ θυγάτηρ "daughter", ἡ γαστήρ "stomach", ἡ Δημήτηρ "Demeter", ὁ ἀνήρ "man".

The first three and γαστήρ use the weak stem in the genitive and dative singular and in the dative plural. The rest use the weak stem in the genitive, dative, and accusative singular and in the plural.

The vocative singular is usually the middle stem without an ending and accent on the first syllable.

	masc.		
πατήρ father
	sg.	du.	pl.
nominative	πατήρ	πατέρε	πατέρες
vocative	πάτερ	πατέρε	πατέρες
accusative	πατέρα	πατέρε	πατέρας
genitive	πατρός	πᾰτέροιν	πατέρων
dative	πατρί	πᾰτέροιν	πατράσι

===== S-stems =====
Nouns in all three genders have stems ending in -εσ- or -οσ-. But in most cases, the σ was lost after being debuccalized to /h/, so for the most part the stems appear to actually end in -ε- -ο-. In Attic, but not Ionic, the ε or ο is contracted with the vowel of the ending. When σ combines with the -σι of the dative plural, the double σσ is simplified to single σ.

====== Masculines in es ======
There are several masculine proper names with nominative singulars in -ης and stems in -εσ-. The vocative singular is the bare stem without an ending.

	Σωκράτης Socrates
sg.
nominative	Σωκράτης
vocative	Σώκρατες
accusative	Σωκράτη/Σωκρᾰ́την
genitive	Σωκράτους
dative	Σωκράτει

====== Feminines in os ======
There are a few feminines with nominative singulars in -ως and stems in -οσ-.

	fem.		
αἰδώς shame
	sg.	du.	pl.
nominative	αἰδώς	αἰδώε	αἰδῶες/αἰδοί
vocative	αἰδώς	αἰδώε	αἰδῶες/αἰδοί
accusative	αἰδῶ	αἰδώε	αἰδώας
genitive	αἰδοῦς	αἰδώοιν	αἰδώων
dative	αἰδοῖ	αἰδώοιν	αἰδώσι

====== Neuters in os ======
Some neuter nouns have nominative, accusative, and vocative singulars in -ος, and stems in -εσ-.

	neut.		
βέλος "missile"
	sg.	du.	pl.
nominative	βέλος	βέλει	βέλη
vocative	βέλος	βέλει	βέλη
accusative	βέλος	βέλει	βέλη
genitive	βέλους	βελοῖν	βελῶν
dative	βέλει	βελοῖν	βέλεσι

==== Vowel-stems ====
These nouns end with ι, υ, ευ, αυ, ου, ω.

===== Stems in long o =====
These take the endings without sound changes.

	masc.		
ἥρως "hero"
	sg.	du.	pl.
nominative	ἥρως	ἥρωε	ἥρωες
vocative	ἥρως	ἥρωε	ἥρωες
accusative	ἥρω/ἥρωα	ἥρωε	ἥρωας
genitive	ἥρωος	ἡρώοιν	ἡρώων
dative	ἥρῳ	ἡρώοιν	ἥρωσι

===== Single-stems in u =====
Because these nouns have a stem ending in -υ-, the accusative singular appears as -υν rather than -υα, and the accusative plural changes by compensatory lengthening from -υνς to -ῡς.

	masc./fem.		
ἰχθύς "fish"
	sg.	du.	pl.
nominative	ἰχθύς	ἰχθῠ́ε	ἰχθύες
vocative	ἰχθύ	ἰχθῠ́ε	ἰχθύες
accusative	ἰχθύν	ἰχθῠ́ε	ἰχθῦς
genitive	ἰχθύος	ἰχθῠ́οιν	ἰχθύων
dative	ἰχθύϊ	ἰχθῠ́οιν	ἰχθύσι

===== Triple-stems in i or u =====
There are many feminine nouns in -ις, and a few masculine nouns in -υς, and one neuter noun: ἄστυ "town".

One stem is in -ι- or -υ-, another is in -ει- or -ευ-, and a third is in -ηι- or -ηυ-. But these stems underwent sound changes, so that they are no longer obvious. Before a vowel, the ι or υ in the second and third stem became the semivowel ι̯ or ϝ, and was lost. The long-vowel stem in the genitive singular was shortened, and the vowel in the ending lengthened (quantitative metathesis). Therefore, there appear to be two stems, ending in ι/υ and ε.

	feminine		
πόλις "city"
	sg.	du.	pl.
nominative	πόλις	πόλει	πόλεις
vocative	πόλι	πόλει	πόλεις
accusative	πόλιν	πόλει	πόλεις
genitive	πόλεως	πολέοιν	πόλεων
dative	πόλει	πολέοιν	πόλεσι

===== Stems in eu, au, ou =====
The nouns in -ευς have two stems: one with short ε, another with long η. Both originally ended with digamma, which by the time of Classical Greek had either vanished or changed to υ. Thus the stems end in -ε(υ)-, from *-εϝ-, and -η-, from *-ηϝ-. In Attic Greek the η of the stem underwent quantitative metathesis with the vowel of the ending—the switching of their lengths. This is the origin of the -ως, -ᾱ, and ᾱς of the forms based on the stem in -η-.

	masculine		
βασιλεύς "king"
	sg.	du.	pl.
nominative	βασιλεύς	βᾰσῐλῆ	βασιλεῖς
vocative	βασιλεῦ	βᾰσῐλῆ	βασιλεῖς
accusative	βασιλέᾱ	βᾰσῐλῆ	βασιλέᾱς
genitive	βασιλέως	βᾰσῐλέοιν	βασιλέων
dative	βασιλεῖ	βᾰσῐλέοιν	βασιλεῦσι

The nouns with a vowel before the -εύς often contract the final ε of the stem (either original or from quantitative metathesis of η), which disappears into the following ω and ᾱ of the genitive and accusative singular and plural. As is the rule, the vowel resulting from contraction takes a circumflex:

- nom.: ἁλιεύς "fisherman", gen.: ἁλιέως and ἁλιῶς, plural ἁλιέων and ἁλιῶν, acc.: ἁλιέᾱ and ἁλιᾶ, plural ἁλιέᾱς and ἁλιᾶς.

===== Stems in oi =====
Stems in -οι- end in -ω in the nominative singular. The ι becomes the semivowel ι̯ and is lost, except in the vocative singular. There are no plural forms; when the plural does appear, it follows the second declension. The rest of the cases are formed by contraction.

	feminine
ἠχώ "echo"
sg.
nominative	ἠχώ
vocative	ἠχοῖ
accusative	ἠχώ
genitive	ἠχοῦς
dative	ἠχοῖ

== Derivation ==
=== Diminutive suffixes ===
New nouns may be formed by suffix addition. Sometimes suffixes are added on top of each other:

- βῐ́βλος bíblos "papyrus"
  - βιβλίον biblíon "book"
  - βιβλάριον, βιβλιάριον, βιβλαρίδιον, βιβλιδάριον "small scroll"
    biblárion, bibliárion, biblarídion, biblidárion
  - βιβλίδιον biblídion "petition"
