= Photogram =

Photographic technique

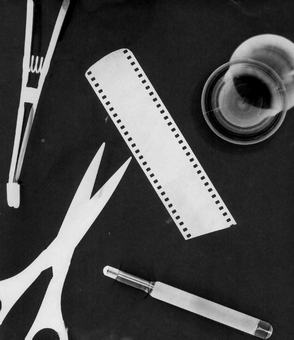
A photogram of a number of photography-related objects

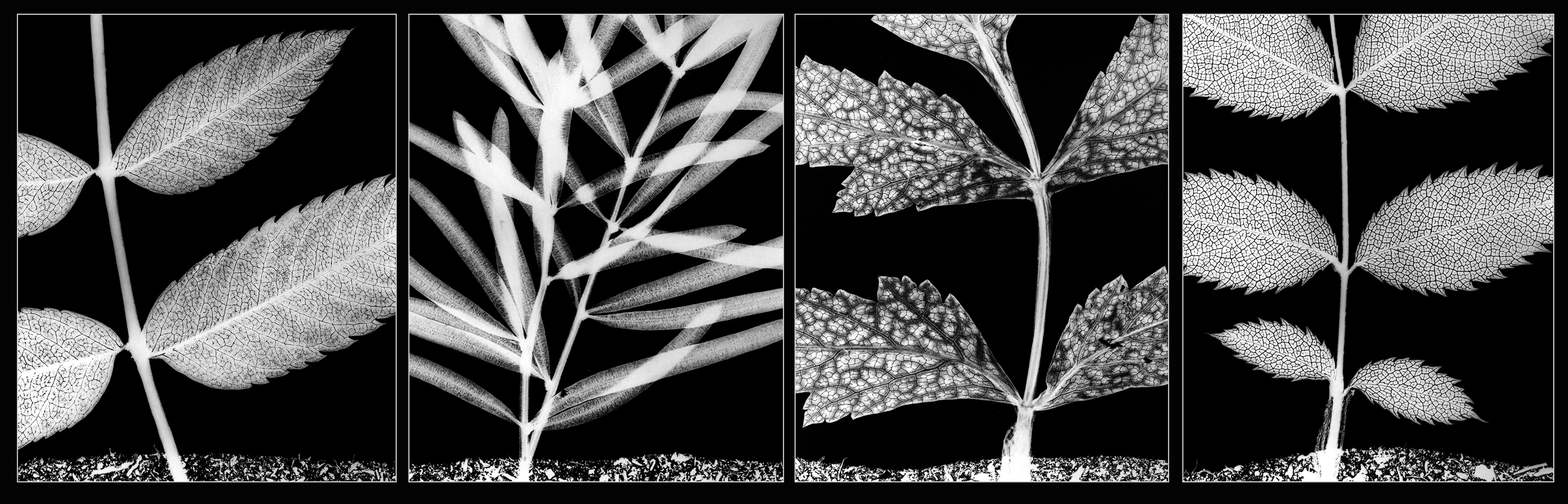
Photogram with soil and plants

A photogram is a photographic image made without a camera by placing objects directly onto the surface of a light-sensitive material such as photographic paper and then exposing it to light.

The usual result is a negative shadow image that shows variations in tone that depends upon the transparency of the objects used. Areas of the paper that have received no light appear white; those exposed for a shorter time or through transparent or semi-transparent objects appear grey, while fully-exposed areas are black in the final print.

The technique is sometimes called cameraless photography. It was used by Man Ray in his rayographs. Other artists who have experimented with the technique include László Moholy-Nagy, Christian Schad (who called them "Schadographs"), Imogen Cunningham and Pablo Picasso.

Variations of the technique have also been used for scientific purposes, in shadowgraph studies of flow in transparent media and in high-speed Schlieren photography, and in the medical X-ray.

The term photogram comes from the combining form phōtō- (φωτω-) of Ancient Greek phôs (φῶς, "light"), and Ancient Greek suffix -gramma (-γραμμα), from grámma (γράμμα, "written character, letter, that which is drawn"), from gráphō (γράφω, "to scratch, to scrape, to graze").

== History ==
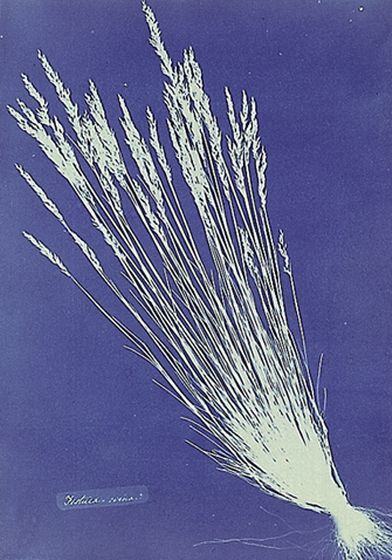
One of Anna Atkins's cyanotype photograms of Festuca grasses

=== Prehistory ===
The phenomenon of the shadow has long aroused human curiosity and inspired artistic representation, as recorded by Pliny the Elder, and various forms of shadow play since the 1st millennium BCE. The photogram, in essence, is a means by which the fall of light and shade on a surface may be automatically captured and preserved.

To do so required a substance that would react to light. From the 17th century, photochemical reactions were progressively observed or discovered in salts of silver, iron, uranium and chromium. In 1725, Johann Heinrich Schulze was the first to demonstrate a temporary photographic effect in silver salts, confirmed by Carl Wilhhelm Scheele in 1777, who found that violet light caused the greatest reaction in silver chloride. Humphry Davy and Thomas Wedgwood reported that they had produced temporary images from placing stencils/light sources on photo-sensitized materials but had no means of fixing (making permanent) the images.

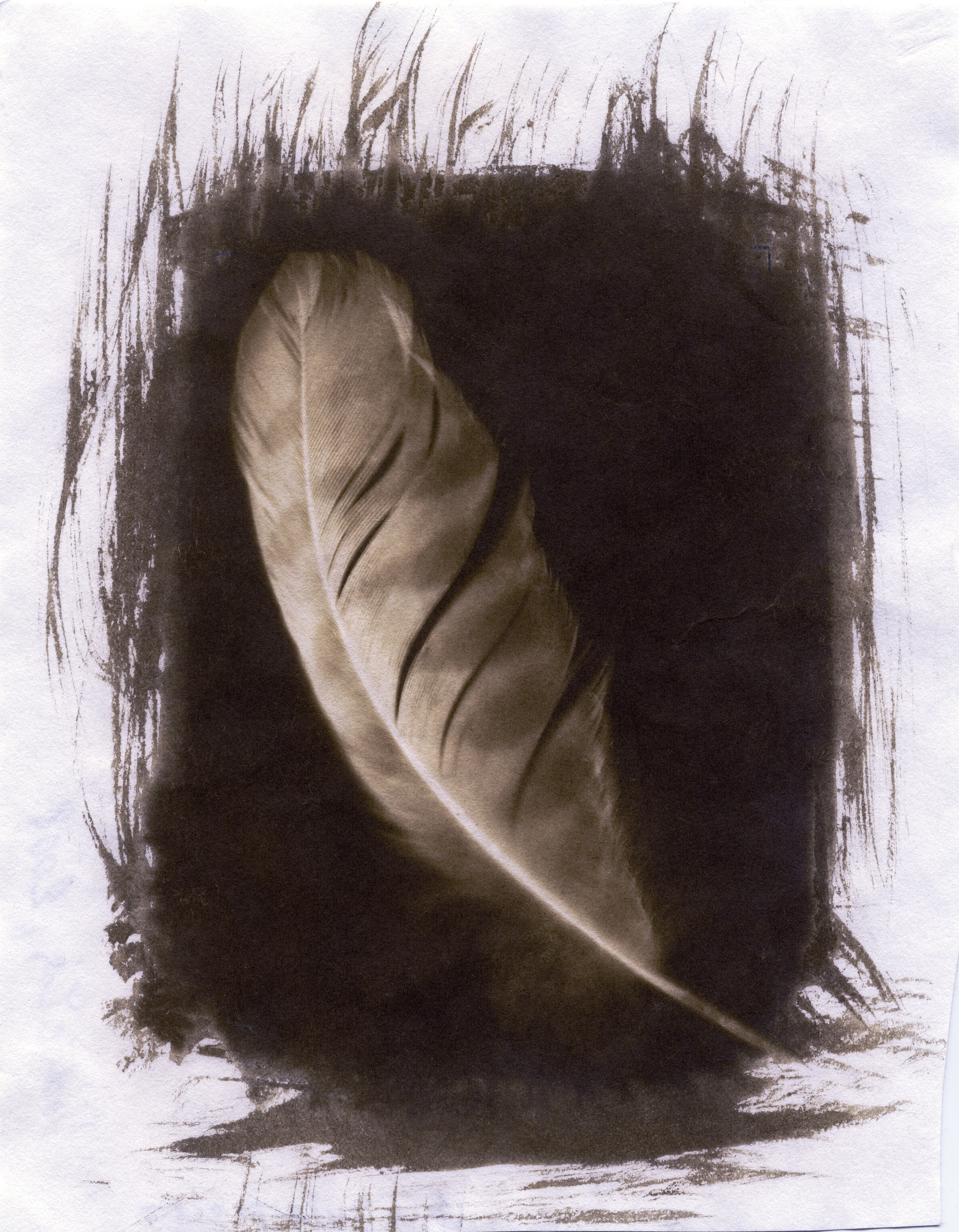
Photogram of a feather by Van Dyke brown print copying technique.

=== Nineteenth century ===
The first photographic negatives made were photograms (though the first permanent photograph was made with a camera by Nicéphore Niépce). William Henry Fox Talbot called these photogenic drawings, which he made by placing leaves or pieces of lace onto sensitized paper, then leaving them outdoors on a sunny day to expose them. This produced a dark background with a white silhouette of the placed object.

In 1843, Anna Atkins produced a book titled British Algae: Cyanotype Impressions in installments, the first to be illustrated with photographs. The images were all photograms of botanical specimens, mostly seaweeds, which she made using Sir John Herschel's cyanotype process, which yields blue images.

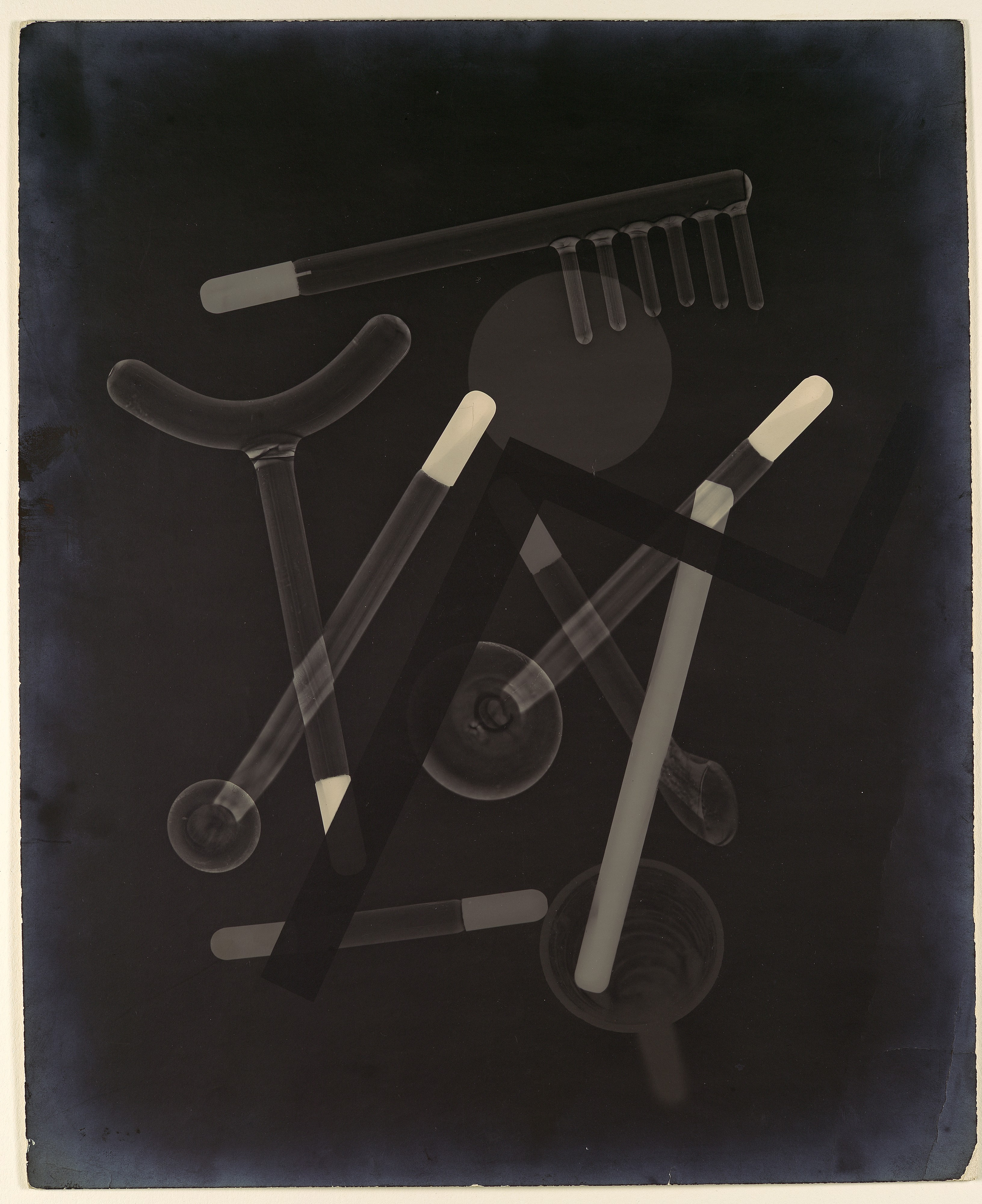
Gelatin silver print photogram by Jaromír Funke (1926; modernism)

=== Modernism ===
Photograms and artists who worked with(in)the medium have contributed to several demarcated modern art movements, such as Dada and Constructivism, and in architecture in the formalist dissections of the Bauhaus.

The relative ease of access (not needing a camera and, depending on the medium, a darkroom) and perhaps the interactive, even seemingly incidental, nature of creating photograms enabled experiments in abstraction by Christian Schad as early as 1918, Man Ray in 1921, and Moholy-Nagy in 1922, through dematerialisation and distortion, merging and interpenetration of forms, and flattening of perspective.

Outside Europe and North America, interwar photographic modernism in Japan’s "New Photography" movement (shinkō shashin) included work in photograms, which the critic Nobuo Ina identified (along with photomontage) as one of the movement’s approaches.

=== Christian Schad's 'schadographs' ===
In 1918, Christian Schad's experiments with the photogram were inspired by Dada, creating photograms from random arrangements of discarded objects he had collected such as torn tickets, receipts and rags. Some argue that he was the first to make this an art form, preceding Man Ray and László Moholy-Nagy by at least a year or two, and one was published in March 1920 in the magazine Dadaphone by Tristan Tzara, who dubbed them 'Schadographs'.

=== Man Ray's 'rayographs' ===
Man Ray, 1922, Untitled Rayograph, gelatin silver photogram, 23.5 x 17.8 cm

Photograms were used in the 20th century by a number of photographers, particularly Man Ray, whose "rayographs" were also given the name by Dada leader Tzara. Ray described his (re-)discovery of the process in his 1963 autobiography;

"Again at night I developed the last plates I had exposed; the following night I set to work printing them. Besides the trays and chemical solutions in bottles, a glass graduate and thermometer, a box of photographic paper, my laboratory equipment was nil. Fortunately, I had to make only contact prints from the plates. I simply laid a glass negative on a sheet of light-sensitive paper on the table, by the light of my little red lantern, turned on the bulb that hung from the ceiling, for a few seconds, and developed the prints. It was while making these prints that I hit on my Rayograph process, or cameraless photographs. One sheet of photo paper got into the developing tray - a sheet unexposed that had been mixed with those already exposed under the negatives - I made my several exposures first, developing them together later - and as I waited in vain a couple of minutes for an image to appear, regretting the waste paper, I mechanically placed a small glass funnel, the graduate and the thermometer in the tray on the wetted paper, I turned on the light: before my eyes an image began to form, not quite a simple silhouette of the objects as in a straight photograph, but distorted and refracted by the glass more or less in contact with the paper and standing out against a black background, the part directly exposed to the light. I remembered when I was a boy placing fern leaves in a printing frame with proof paper, exposing it to sunlight, and obtaining a white negative of the leaves. This was the same idea, but with an added three-dimensional quality and tonal gradation."

Rayographs in an excerpt of Return to Reason (1923)

In his photograms, Man Ray made combinations of objects—a comb, a spiral of cut paper, an architect's French curve—some recognisable, others transformed, typifying Dada's rejection of 'style', emphasising chance and abstraction. He published a selection of these rayographs as Champs délicieux in December 1922, with an introduction by Tzara. His 1923 film Le Retour à la Raison ('Return to Reason') adapts rayograph technique to moving images.

=== Other 20th century artists ===
In the 1930s, artists including Theodore Roszak, and Piet Zwart also made photograms. Luigi Veronesi combined the photographic image with oil on canvas in large-scale colour images by preparing a light-sensitive canvas on which he placed objects in the dark for exposure and then fixing.

The shapes became the matrix for an abstract painting to which he applied colour and added drawn geometric lines to enhance the dynamics, exhibiting them at the Galerie L'Equipe in Paris in 1938–1939. Bronislaw Schlabs, Julien Coulommier, Andrzej Pawlowski and Beksinki were photogram artists in the 1940s and 1950s; Heinz Hajek-Halke and Kurt Wendlandt with their light graphics in the 1960s; Lina Kolarova, Rene Mächler, Dennis Oppenheim, and Andreas Mulas in the 1970s; and Tomy Ceballos, Kare Magnole, Andreas Müller-Pohle, and Floris M. Neusüss in the 1980s.

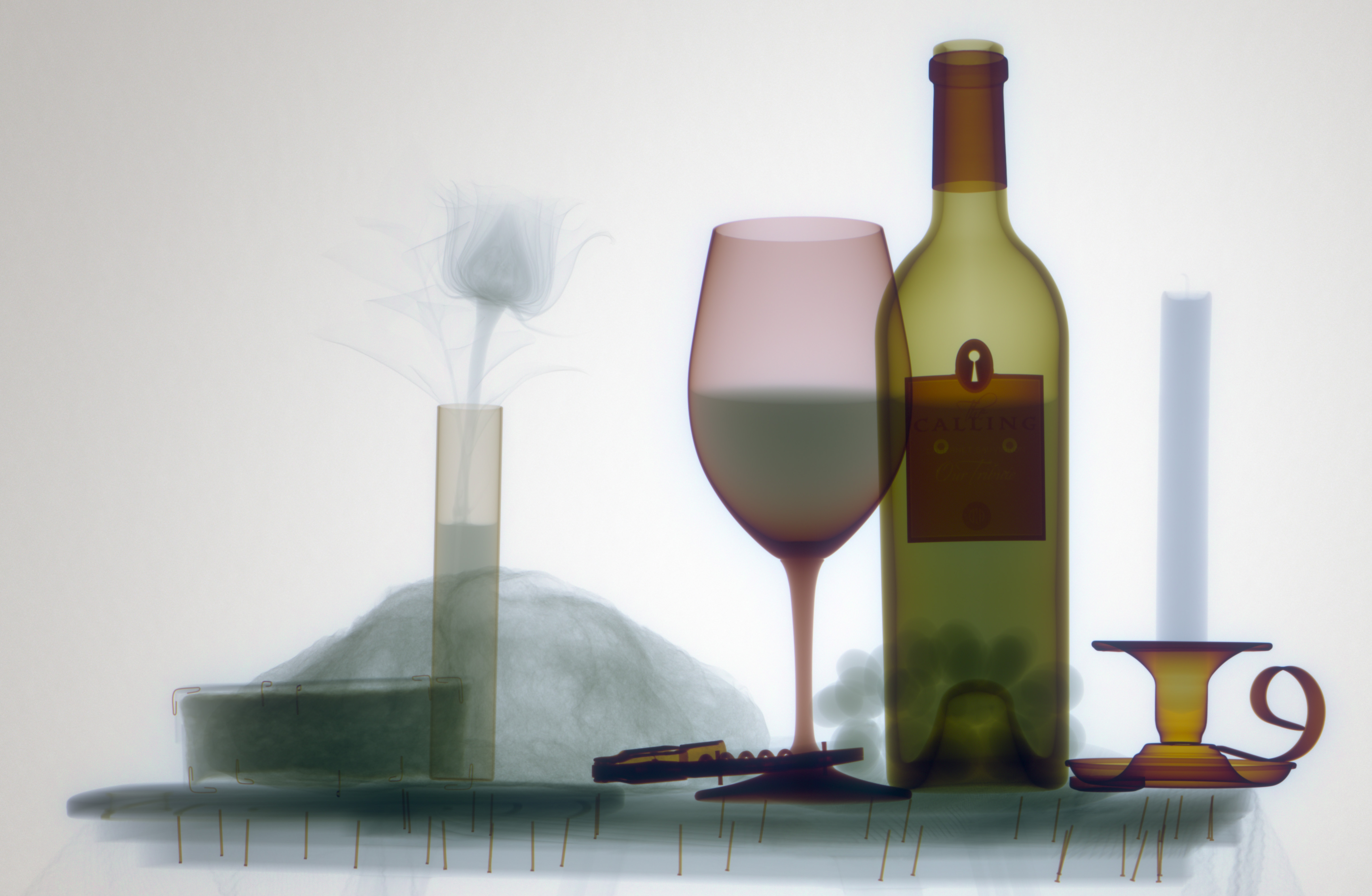
Modern color x-ray photogram of a wine scene

=== Contemporary ===
Established contemporary artists who are widely known for using photograms are Adam Fuss, Susan Derges, Christian Marclay, and Karen Amy Finkel Fishof, who has digitized and minted her photograms as NFTs. Younger artists worldwide continue to value the materiality of the technique in the digital age. Mauritian artist Audrey Albert uses cameraless techniques to connect material culture to contemporary identities of Chagos Islanders.

== Procedure ==
The customary approach to making a photogram is to use a darkroom and enlarger and to proceed as one would in making a conventional print, but instead of using a negative, to arrange objects on top of a piece of photographic paper for exposure under the enlarger lamp which can be controlled with the timer switch and aperture controls. That will give a result similar to the image at left; since the enlarger emits light through a lens aperture, the shadows of even tall objects like the beaker standing upright on the paper will stay sharp; the more so at smaller apertures.

The print is then processed, washed, and dried.

Generation of a photogram: A broad-source light (1) illuminates objects (2 and 3) that are placed directly in front of a sheet of photosensitive paper. Depending on the object's distance to the paper and properties of light emitted by the light source, the object's shadows look sharper (7) or softer (5). Areas of the paper that are in total shadow (6) stay white; they become grey (8) if the objects are transparent or translucent (9); areas that are fully exposed to the light (4) are blackened. Point source light (e.g. enlarger lens at a small f-stop) will cast hard shadows.

At this stage the image will look similar to a negative, in which shadows are white. A contact-print onto a fresh sheet of photographic paper will reverse the tones if a more naturalistic result is desired, which may be facilitated by making the initial print on film.

However, there are other arrangements for making photograms, and devising them is part of the creative process. Alice Lex-Nerlinger used the conventional darkroom approach in making photograms as a variation on her airbrushed stencil paintings, since lighting penetrating the translucent paper from which she cut her pictures would print a variegated texture she could not otherwise obtain.

Another component of this medium is the light source, or sources, used. A broad source of light will cast nuances of shadow; umbra, penumbra and antumbra, as shown in the accompanying diagram.

Photograms may be made outdoors providing the photographic emulsion is sufficiently slow to permit it. Direct sunlight is a point-source of light (like that of an enlarger), while cloudy conditions give soft-edged shadows around three-dimensional objects placed on the photosensitive surface. The cyanotype process ('blueprints') such as that used by Anna Atkins (see above), is slow and insensitive enough that fixing an impression on paper, fabric, timber or other supports can be done in subdued light indoors.

Exposure outdoors may take many minutes depending on conditions, and its progress may be gauged by inspection as the coating darkens. 'Printing-out paper' or other daylight-printing material such as gum bichromate may also enable outdoor exposure. Christian Schad simply placed tram tickets and other ephemera under glass on printing-out paper on his window-sill for exposure.

Conventional monochrome or colour, or direct-positive photographic material may be exposed in the dark using a flash unit, as does Adam Fuss for his photograms that capture the movement of a crawling baby, or an eel in shallow water.

Susan Derges captures water currents in the same way, while Harry Nankin has immersed large sheets of monochrome photographic paper at the edge of the sea and mounted a flash on a specially-constructed oversize tripod above it to capture the action of waves and seaweeds washing over the paper surface. In 1986, Floris Neusüss began his Nachtbilder ('nocturnal pictures'), exposed by lightning.

Other variations include using the light of a television screen or computer display, pressing the photosensitive paper to the surface. Multiple light sources or exposing with multiple flashes of light, or moving the light source during exposure, projecting shadows from a low-angle light, and using successive exposures while moving, removing or adding shadows, will produce multiple shadows of varying quality.

== List of notable photographers using photograms ==
- Markus Amm
- Anna Atkins
- Walead Beshty
- Christopher Bucklow
- Kate Cordsen
- Keith Carter
- Olive Cotton
- Susan Derges
- Michael Flomen
- Adam Fuss
- Heinz Hajek-Halke
- Raoul Hausmann
- John Herschel
- Edmund Kesting
- Len Lye
- László Moholy-Nagy
- Alice Lex-Nerlinger
- Floris Michael Neusüss
- Anne Noble
- Andrzej Pawlowski
- Pablo Picasso
- Man Ray
- Alexander Rodchenko
- Theodore Roszak
- Christian Schad
- Greg Stimac
- August Strindberg
- Jean-Pierre Sudre
- Kunié Sugiura
- Henry Fox Talbot
- Mikhail Tarkhanov
- Elsa Thiemann
- Luigi Veronesi
- Kurt Wendlandt
- Nancy Wilson-Pajic
- Kansuke Yamamoto

== See also ==
- Luminogram – photogram using light only with no objects
- Schlieren photography – light is focused with a lens or mirror and a knife edge is placed at the focal point to create graduated shadows of flow and waves in otherwise transparent media like air, water, or glass
- Shadowgraph – like Schlieren photography, but without the knife-edge, reveals non-uniformities in transparent media
- Chemigram – camera-less technique using photographic (and other) chemistry with light
- Neues Sehen – László Moholy-Nagy's 'New Vision' photography movement
- Cliché verre – semiphotographic printmaking technique using a negative created by drawing
- Drawn-on-film animation – cliche-verre technique in which movie film emulsion is scratched and drawn frame-by-frame
- Cyanotype – photographic printing process that produces a cyan-blue print
- Kirlian photography – photographic techniques used to capture the phenomenon of electrical coronal discharges
