= Michael Flomen =

Canadian artist

- Born: 1952 (age 73–74); Montreal, Quebec
- Known for: photographer
- Website: michael-flomen.squarespace.com

Michael Flomen (born 1952) is a self-taught Canadian artist who primarily creates photograms, or cameraless photographs in collaboration with nature. Flomen began taking photographs in the late 1960s, and since 1972 his work has been exhibited internationally. Snow, water, firefly light, wind, sand, sediment, shorelines and other natural phenomena make up the elements used to create his photograms.

== Biography ==
Michael Flomen was born in Montreal, Quebec in 1952. From 1969 to 1971 Flomen attended Darrow School located on the site of an historic Shaker village in the Taconic Mountains, west of the central Berkshires in New Lebanon, New York.

Flomen began to take photographs in his teenage years in 1967-68 capturing images of his family and everyday surroundings. In 1969-1971 during his time at Darrow School he created a series on his surroundings in the Shaker-built community. In 1971 at the age of 19, Flomen traveled to Europe and decided during his trip that he would pursue photography once he returned to Canada. Flomen originally planned to study Marine Biology at the University of Miami, but he still retained an active interest in science and the natural world.

In 1972, Flomen was introduced to William (Bill) Ewing, the owner-director of les Galeries photographiques du Centaur, (known as Optica after 1974) in Montreal. In these early years Flomen started to work as a darkroom printer and collaborator for many artists, including Jacques Henri Lartigue (1894-1986), Lynne Cohen (1944-2014), and Adam Fuss (b. 1961). At Centaur, Flomen was exposed to books on the art of photography that inspired his passion. He wanted to be a part of the 20th century movement to elevate photography's status to that of a fine art.

Flomen's meeting with Ewing led to his first solo exhibition Shaker Light in 1972 at Centaur which featured his photographs he took of Shaker architecture at the site of the Mount Lebanon Shaker community. His career in printing and photography advanced from there. Ewing soon introduced Flomen to his future mentor, the filmmaker-photographer Guy Borremans who later rented his Plateau apartment equipped with a darkroom to Flomen. Around this time, Borremans introduced him to Vittorio Fiorucci, an internationally known graphic designer and longtime friend who had a major, lasting influence on Flomen. In the early 1970s, Flomen began to work as a commercial photographer while making street photographs.

== Artwork ==
=== Street photography: 1971 – c.1991 ===
In 1971 Flomen started working on his street photography. By 1976 he had built a darkroom equipped with large vats that he designed for developing his large-scale prints, and had acquired massive Saltzman enlargers designed by the US military for map-making. In the same year he was included in an important group show Young Canadian Photographers at the Yajima/Galerie in Montreal. In 1980, Flomen's first book of street photographs, Details/M. Flomen, was published. The works in Details followed a Cartier-Bresson style of formalism, making use of the decisive moment in photographs taken in various locations around the world. In the publication Details/M. Flomen, Louis Patrick describes Flomen's early series as, "photographic double-entendres; posing visual riddles while keeping us amused with black and white one-liners." Patrick goes on to say, "Although Flomen often photographs people and events, he is not a photojournalist, but a street magician whose camera transforms the little details of everyday life into mysterious, sometimes almost sinister, reflections of today’s society...The images, instead of telling us who, when or where, tease us by asking what and why—questions Flomen prefers us to answer for ourselves."

In 1985 Flomen's work was included in a group exhibition Canadian Contemporary Photography, from the Collection of the National Film Board at the National Gallery of Canada, in Ottawa, Ontario. His street photography was featured in a second art publication Still Life Draped Stone of 1985. In the foreword of the book, Peter Sibbald Brown gives a summary of Flomen's sensibility as a street photographer: "The mainstream of Flomen's work over the past decade has been concerned with intrinsic pictorial values. The pictures are horizontal, full-frame, monochromatic, non-didactic, neither ornamental nor monumental in scale. They reveal an overallness of detail, and for the most part present anonymous anthropomorphic form, within a tectonic surround."

Flomen's format and style of photography changed drastically in the early 1990s when he began to document large snow drifts in Montreal using large format cameras, switching from 35 mm to 8 x 10 inch film. In 1993 he received a 6-month grant from the Québec Ministry of Cultural Affairs for a studio residency in a loft in New York City. While there he worked with photographer Todd Watts, and he produced large-format photographs that would later be included in his Night and Friend installations at Motel Fine Arts gallery in New York. In 1995, Flomen exhibited the series Imminent Ground at Galerie Vox in Montreal. In the art magazine Ciel Variable, Jennifer Couëlle describes these works: "Flomen's landscapes, which look more like moonscapes, but are in fact snowscapes, are convincing. They are a world of detail come to life through an astutely dramatic use of framing and lighting."

=== Cameraless photography ===
Flomen's stylistic and technical transition away from large format cameras to making cameraless images, or photograms, began in 1999 when he exposed images directly onto 8 x 10 inch film negatives from the natural light source of fireflies. Flomen was in Vermont at his cottage where he often stays, and at dusk he wanted to make photographs of the fireflies that came out, but without using a camera or flash. He collaborated with a firefly to create a photogram by exposing the 8 x 10 inch negative with the firefly's light. Flomen took the negative and printed the first works in the series Higher Ground.

In the mid to late 2000s, Flomen began a series of photograms called Teeming that documented shorelines and natural bodies of water. In this series he started to work directly onto light-sensitive paper, capturing images of fish, seaweed, sediment and other organic matter. In 2008, Flomen's work was shown in the exhibition Fragile at Galerie Pangée in Montréal. In a text published in connection to this exhibition, John K. Grande wrote that "by making visible parts of a world previously unseen and even unsuspected by many of us, he places us squarely on the threshold of an ineffable visual space that dwarfs, seduces - and promises to swallow us whole."

Grande wrote about works from Teeming again in the 2011 publication Eco-Art: "A Brassai of the backwoods, whose streets are rivers, and stoplights are trees, Michael Flomen (1952) generates imagery that is not in the language of today's cult of the image, and he does [this] throughout the four seasons, whether in Vermont, the Laurentians of Quebec, or elsewhere. Flomen's black and white large format images are hieroglyphs of an explorer who works with light to reveal what is there, but seldom seen. Flomen's activity produces remarkable documents of natural diversity, of collaboration with nature, something that gives them their unquestionable dynamism."

In his Crunchtime series from the later part of the 2000s, Flomen began to physically crush the photo-sensitive paper itself to capture various levels of texture and depth in different natural environments. In Flomen's Pharmed series from the 2010s, Flomen exposed original glass plate negatives in situ, directly from nature without using a camera, to use for printing his photographs. The origins and context of this series are described in a folio of his works from the series: "The light sensitive emulsions were prepared by the artist for exposure in swampy watersheds during the height of the spring season. At night, at water’s edge, Flomen documents the organic elements that exist in these highly vibrant landscapes. The artist prints from the large format glass plates onto gelatin silver paper. The results are otherworldly, revealing the birthing of something new."

== Collections ==
- Whitney Museum of American Art, New York
- Philadelphia Museum of Art, Philadelphia, Pennsylvania
- George Eastman House, Rochester, New York
- Museum of Fine Arts, Boston, Massachusetts
- Harvard University Art Museums - Fogg Art Museum, Cambridge, Massachusetts
- Norton Museum of Art, West Palm Beach, Florida
- Los Angeles County Museum of Art, Los Angeles, California
- Winnipeg Art Gallery, Winnipeg, Manitoba
- Ministry of External Affairs, Ottawa, Ontario
- Musée de L’Architecture, Liège, Belgium
- Mt. Lebanon Shaker Museum, New Lebanon, New York
- Musée national des beaux-arts du Québec, Québec
- The National Gallery of Canada, Ottawa, Ontario
- National Archives of Canada, Ottawa, Ontario
- Glenbow Museum, Calgary, Alberta
- Nipissing University, North Bay, Ontario.
- The Nelson Atkins Museum of Art, Kansas City, Missouri
- Kitchener – Waterloo Art Gallery, Kitchener, Ontario
- Montréal Museum of Fine Arts, Montréal, Québec
- Musée d'art de Joliette, Joliette, Québec

== Exhibitions ==
=== Solo ===
- 2019 :
  - « FLOW Photofest », Inverness Museum and Art Gallery, Inverness, Scotland, United Kingdom.
  - Trop tard, PHOS Festival photo + art, Matane, QC, Canada.
- 2018 : Michael Flomen at Somerset House, Duran/Mashaal Gallery, Photo London 2018, London, United Kingdom.
- 2017 : Dark Waters, Denny Gallery, New York, NY, United States.
- 2014 :
  - Wild Nights, Boîte noire Gallery, Los Angeles, CA, United States.
  - Intuitive Vision, Kitchener-Waterloo Art Gallery, Kitchener, ON, Canada.
- 2013 : Nuit sauvages, VU Photo, Québec, QC, Canada.
- 2008 : Fragile. The photograms of Michael Flomen, Galerie Pangée, Montréal, QC, Canada.
- 2005 : Teeming, Ricco/Maresca Gallery, New York, NY, United States.
- 1972 : Shaker Light, Photographic gallery of Centaur, Montréal, QC, Canada.

=== Group ===
- 2022 : Articulating Legibility: Works from the Permanent Collection, 30 Mar 2021 – 6 Mar 2022, Kitchener-Waterloo Art Gallery, Kitchener, ON, Canada.
- 2021 :
  - The Expanded Landscape, 19 June – 10 Oct, The Getty Center, Los Angeles, CA, United States.
  - Des horizons d’attente, Musée d’art contemporain de Montréal, Montréal, QC, Canada.
- 2019 :
  - « Small Between the Stars, Large Against the Sky. » 16 Feb – 22 Apr, Musée national des beaux-arts du Québec Manif d’Art 9 - The Quebec Biennial, Quebec, QC, Canada, curated by Jonathan Watkins.
  - Bilder Ohne Kamera, 14 Aug – 20 Sep, Eboran Galerie, Fotogrammatische Werke aus des Sammlung SpallArt, Salzburg, Austria.
- 2018 :
  - Nuit solaire, 26–27 Jan, Musée national des beaux-arts de Québec, Québec, QC, Canada, curated by Sébastien Hudon.
  - Submerged, 16–17 Jun, SciArt Center, 184 Orchard Gallery, New York, United States.
- 2017 : Le temps file : Portait de la vanité dans la collection du MNBAQ, 6 Apr – Sep 24 Musée national des beaux-arts du Québec, Québec, Canada.
- 1976 : « Young Canadian Photographers », The Yajima Gallery, Montréal, QC, Canada.
