= Stefan Koppelkamm =

German artist and author

Stefan Koppelkamm (born 1952 in Saarbrücken) is a German artist, designer, photographer and author. He lives in Berlin and Palermo (Italy).

== Biography ==
Stefan Koppelkamm studied at the Kunsthochschule Kassel from 1971 to 1976 under Hans Hillmann, Floris Michael Neusüss and Heinz Nickel, majoring in graphic design, photography and printmaking. In 1978, on a trip to Belgium and Great Britain, he took photographs for a book about the wintergardens of the 19th century. From 1978 to 1979 he lived in Berkeley and San Francisco: Parallel to working on his book, he created paintings on paper, which were exhibited at the Kassel Kunstverein in 1980.

In 1981, his book Glasshouses and Wintergardens of the Nineteenth Century (Gewächshäuser und Wintergärten im 19. Jahrhundert) was published to accompany the eponymous exhibition in Kassel. In the same year he moved to Berlin and started working as a photographer for architects, the International Building Exhibition and various magazines, and researching on the history of architecture and gardening. In 1987 he published his book Der imaginäre Orient. Exotische Architekturen des 18. und 19. Jahrhunderts (The Imaginary Orient: Exotic Buildings of the 18th and 19th Centuries in Europe and co-curated the exhibition Exotische Welten – Europäische Phantasien (Exotic Worlds – European Fantasies) at the Württembergischer Kunstverein Stuttgart. Another focus of his work became curating and designing exhibitions (including Peter Joseph Lenné, German Architecture Museum, 1993).

From 1993 to 2017, Koppelkamm was professor of Visual Communication at the Weißensee Academy of Art Berlin. In 2014/15 and 2017/18, he held visiting professorships at the Accademia di Belle Arti di Palermo.

With the publication of his photography book Ortszeit Local Time, the focus of his work shifted to the field of artistic photography. His projects almost always relate to urban space. They make social and historical changes visible (Ortszeit Local Time, Stuttgart, 2006), address phenomena of global urban life (Screening, Stuttgart 2010) or explore the contradictions of a historical city (Palermo. Lavori in corso, Berlin, 2017). In his project Essen, Trinken, Reden (Eat, drink, talk) (2012/13) he explores the relationship between the architectural space and its acoustic atmosphere by combining photographs of empty restaurants with sound recordings.

For years Stefan Koppelkamm has been collecting scenes from films which deal with art, artists, and their audiences. Based on his archive, he creates new short films under the project title How about Art? which he exhibits as multi-channel video installations.

Photographs of billboards Koppelkamm had taken in Palermo and Berlin since 2018 led to the creation of large-scale sculptural paper works in the tradition of the décollage artists Mimmo Rotella, Jacques Villeglé, and Raymond Hains.

== Books ==
- Glasshouses and Wintergardens of the Nineteenth Century. London/New York 1981, ISBN 978-0-8478-0387-3.
- mit Michael Seiler: Pfaueninsel. Berlin/Tübingen 1993, ISBN 3-8030-2713-6.
- Ortszeit Local Time. With a text by Ludger Derenthal, Stuttgart 2006, ISBN 3-936681-03-1.
- Screening. With texts by Roland Schimmelpfennig, Stuttgart/London 2010, ISBN 978-3-936681-41-3.
- The Imaginary Orient: Exotic Buildings of the 18th and 19th Centuries in Europe. Stuttgart/London 2015, ISBN 3-936681-77-5.
- Palermo. Lavori in corso. Berlin 2017 (Texts: Italian, German, English), ISBN 978-3-7757-4317-4.

== Exhibition catalogues ==
- Stefan Koppelkamm: Boire, manger, parler. Images et sons. In: Mois de la Photo à Paris 2012. Arles 2012, ISBN 978-2-330-01015-7, S. 276 ff.
- Ludger Derenthal: Ein neuer Blick. Architekturfotografie aus den staatlichen Museen Berlin. Museum für Fotografie, Berlin 2010, ISBN 978-3-8030-0704-9, S. 331/332, 341.
- Hans-Werner Schmidt (Hrsg.): Stefan Koppelkamm. Häuser Räume Stimmen. Houses Rooms Voices. Ausstellungskatalog, Museum der bildenden Künste Leipzig, Ostfildern 2016, ISBN 978-3-7757-4118-7.

== Solo exhibitions ==
- 2009–2010: Ortszeit Local Time. Museo di Roma; Goethe-Institut Neapel; Centre Méridional de l'Architecture, Toulouse; Goethe-Institut Lyon; Palais Carré de Baudouin, Paris; Museum für Kommunikation, Berlin.
- 2012: Boire, manger, parler. Images et sons. Goethe-Institut, Paris.
- 2013: Essen, trinken, reden. Schloss Neuhardenberg.
- 2015: Screening. Galerie t, Düsseldorf.
- 2016: Stefan Koppelkamm. Häuser Räume Stimmen. Houses Rooms Voices. Museum der bildenden Künste, Leipzig.
- 2017: Palermo. Lavori in corso. Palazzo Ziino, Palermo.
- 2022: Stefan Koppelkamm, How about Art? Filminstallation, Kunst- und Projekthaus Torstraße 111, Berlin.

== Group shows ==
- 2004: Back to Kassel 3 – Fotografie. Kasseler Kunstverein.
- 2006: Stadt/Fotografie. Stadtmuseum Düsseldorf.
- 2010: Ein neuer Blick. Architekturfotografie aus den staatlichen Museen Berlin. Museum für Fotografie, Berlin.
- 2023: Abstract City. Diamant Offenbach, Museum of Urban Culture.

== Works in public collections ==
- Museum für Fotografie (Berlin)
- Museum der bildenden Künste Leipzig
