= Tarkhanov =

Tarkhanov (Russian: Тарханов) is a Russian masculine surname, its feminine counterpart is Tarkhanova. It may refer to:

- Aleksandr Tarkhanov (born 1954), Russian football coach and former player
- Ivan Tarkhanov (painter) (1780–1848), Russian painter
- Ivan Tarkhanov (physiologist) (1846–1908), Georgian physiologist
- Mikhail Tarkhanov (actor) (1877–1948), Russian and Soviet stage actor and theatre director
- Mikhail Tarkhanov (painter) (1888–1962), Russian and Soviet painter
