= Mikhail Tarkhanov =

Mikhail Tarkhanov may refer to:

- Mikhail Tarkhanov (actor) (1877–1948), Russian and Soviet actor
- Mikhail Tarkhanov (painter) (1888–1962), Russian and Soviet painter
