= Martha Wheelock =

- Education: Earlham College
- Occupations: Filmmaker, Educator
- Known for: Feminist films
- Notable work: Forward Into Light, Votes for Women
- Movement: Women's movement
- Father: Frederic M. Wheelock
- Website: wildwestwomen.org

Martha Wheelock is a longtime educator and a filmmaker. She has been involved with the women's movement as far back as 1970. Her political work was documented in a 2017 interview with Veteran Feminists of America.

== Film career ==
Wheelock is notable for her films featuring lesser known women in history. She founded Wild West Women Films in 1976. She co-founded this organization with Kay Weaver. Together they made the widely regarded short film One Fine Day about the history of the women's movement. This film has been widely used in schools and in library archives to promote women's history.

In 1996 she made a film about the suffrage movement titled Votes for Women which marked the 75th anniversary of the 19th Amendment. Wheelock wrote, directed and produced a film on suffragist Inez Milholland titled Forward Into Light.

== LGBT activism ==
Wheelock marched in Christopher street protests in the 1970s. In 1974 she was photographed holding up a sign at a protest that stated "Mother Nature is a Lesbian."

== Board leadership ==
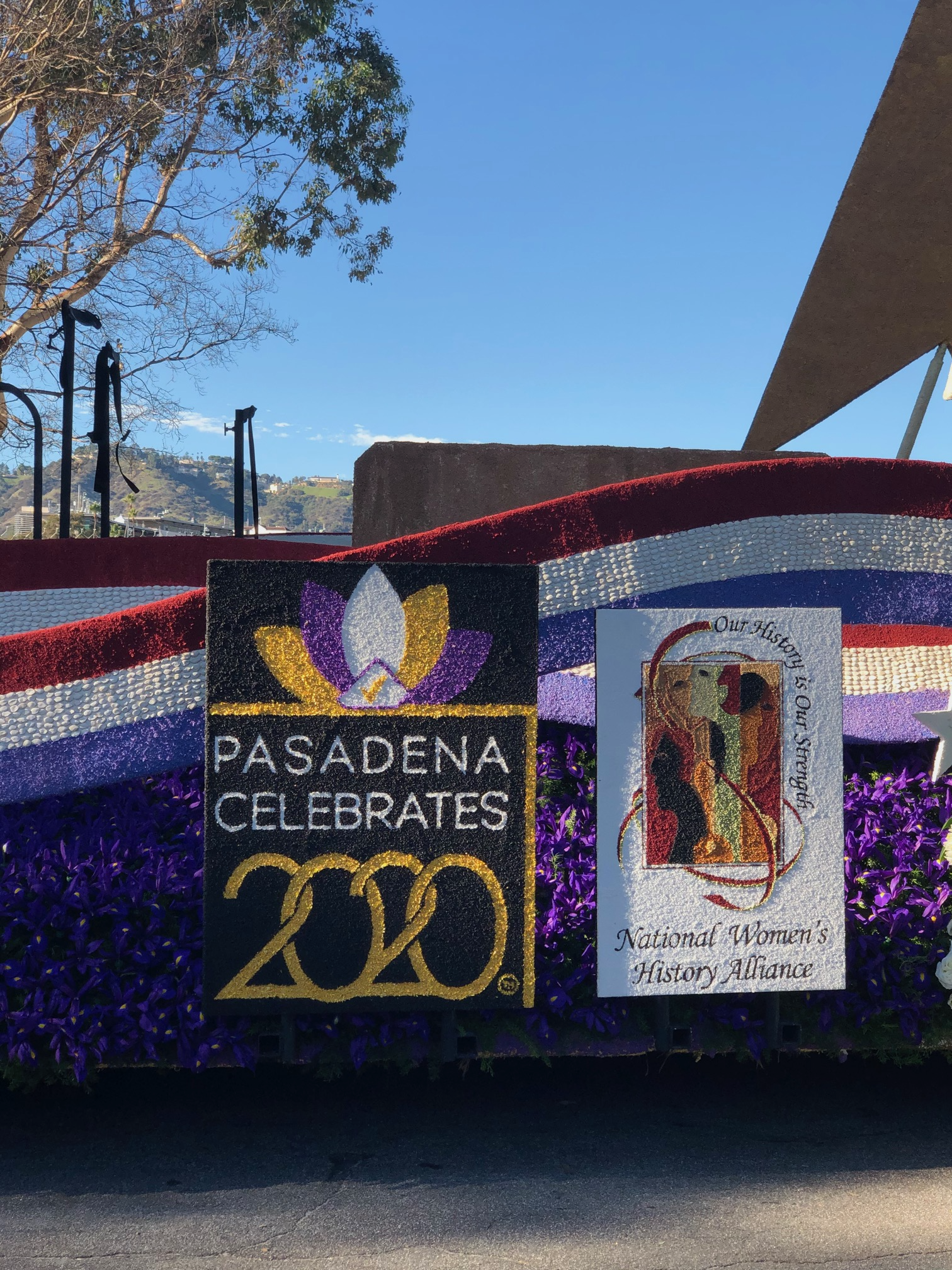
The 2020 Suffrage Centennial Float featuring the logo of the National Women's History Alliance

=== National Women's History Alliance ===
Wheelock has long been a leader of the organization National Women's History Alliance, the organization that created Women's History Month. In 2020, she served as a lead on the creation of the Suffrage Centennial Float in the 2020 Rose Parade. In 2024 and 2025 Wheelock served as president of the board of the National Women's History Alliance.

=== Justice Bell Foundation ===
Wheelock has also served on the board of the Justice Bell Foundation.

== Teaching career ==
Wheelock taught a variety of courses for over forty years including English, women's studies, ethics and theatre. Wheelock taught English, ethnic studies and theatre in New York schools for 18 years. In 2011 she served as the Humanities department chair at Harvard-Westlake.

== Education ==
Wheelock graduated from Miss Hall's school in 1959 and studied in a doctoral program for English at New York University. It was during her time studying there that she realized she wanted to be a filmmaker.

== See also ==
- Molly Murphy Macgregor
- National Women's History Alliance
- Zoe Nicholson
