= Frederic M. Wheelock =

American Latin professor (1902–1987)

Frederic Melvin Wheelock
- Born: September 19, 1902; Lawrence, Massachusetts, U.S.
- Died: October 29, 1987 (aged 85); Sharon, Connecticut, U.S.
- Education: Harvard University
- Occupations: Professor of Classics, Florida Presbyterian (now Eckerd) College
- Children: Martha Wheelock

Frederic Melvin Wheelock (September 19, 1902 – October 29, 1987) was an American Latin professor, best known for his authorship of Wheelock's Latin.

== Early life ==
He was the son of Franklin M. and Etta R. (née Goldthwaite) Wheelock. He graduated cum laude from Harvard University in 1925 and later received both M.A. and Ph.D. degrees from Harvard University.

== Career ==
He taught at Haverford College, Harvard University, the City College of New York, Brooklyn College, Cazenovia Junior College (where he served as dean), the Darrow School for Boys, the University of Toledo (from which he retired in 1968, being a full professor), and Florida Presbyterian College (where he served as visiting professor). Wheelock was a member of the American Classical League, American Philological Association and the Classical Association of the Atlantic States.

== Personal life ==
On August 14, 1937, he married Dororthy Elizabeth Rathbone (1909–1990), daughter of James Colburn Rathbone (1881–1983) and Lillian Ford Rathbone (née Reynolds; 1884–1952). His two children are Martha Ellen Wheelock and Deborah Wheelock Taylor, who continued his legacy as teachers. Ralph Wheelock (1600–1683) was Frederic's paternal 7th great-grandfather.

== Books ==
Wheelock wrote a number of papers and reviews in the areas of textual criticism, paleography, and Latin studies. Some of his works include:

- Wheelock's Latin
- Wheelock's Latin Reader, previously titled Latin Literature: A Book of Readings
- Introduction and annotations of Quintilian as Educator (translated by H. E. Butler)

Biographies of Wheelock written by Ward Briggs appear in the book A Biographical Dictionary of American Classicists (Westport, CT: Greenwood Press, 1994) and in The Classical Outlook (winter 2003 issue).
