= National Women's History Alliance =

American non-profit organization

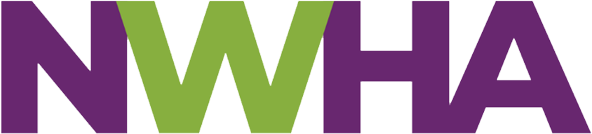
- Founded: 1980
- Founder: Molly Murphy MacGregor; Mary Ruthsdotter; Maria Cuevas; Paula Hammett; Bette Morgan
- Tax ID no.: 68-0068086
- Purpose: To promote women's history in schools and for the general public
- Location: Santa Rosa, California, United States
- Region served: United States
- Key people: Molly Murphy Macgregor, Jill Kracov Zinckgraf
- Website: nationalwomenshistoryalliance.org

The National Women's History Alliance (NWHA) is an American non-profit organization dedicated to honoring and preserving women's history. The NWHA was formerly known as the National Women's History Project. Based out of Santa Rosa, California, since 1980, it was started by women's history activists Molly Murphy MacGregor, Mary Ruthsdotter, Maria Cuevas, Paula Hammett, and Bette Morgan.

The National Women's History Alliance started by leading a coalition that successfully lobbied Congress to designate March as Women's History Month, now celebrated across the country. Today, the National Women's History Alliance is known nationally as the only clearinghouse providing information and training in multicultural women’s history for educators, community organizations, and parents-for anyone wanting to expand their understanding of the historic contributions of women. Martha Wheelock serves as president of the board of the NWHA and Jill Kracov Zinckgraf serves as Interim Executive Director.

== Creation of Women's History Month ==
In 1980, the National Women's History Alliance, then known as the National Women's History Project, was a group of women who noticed that women were absent from textbooks. No more than 3% of the content was devoted to women. The NWHA convinced Congress and the White House of the need for our nation to celebrate and recognize women’s role in history on an annual basis. As a result of their efforts, the week of March 8 (International Women’s Day) was officially designated as Women’s History Week. In 1987, the NWHA led the successful campaign to have the entire month of March declared Women's History Month.

== Promotion of Women's History ==
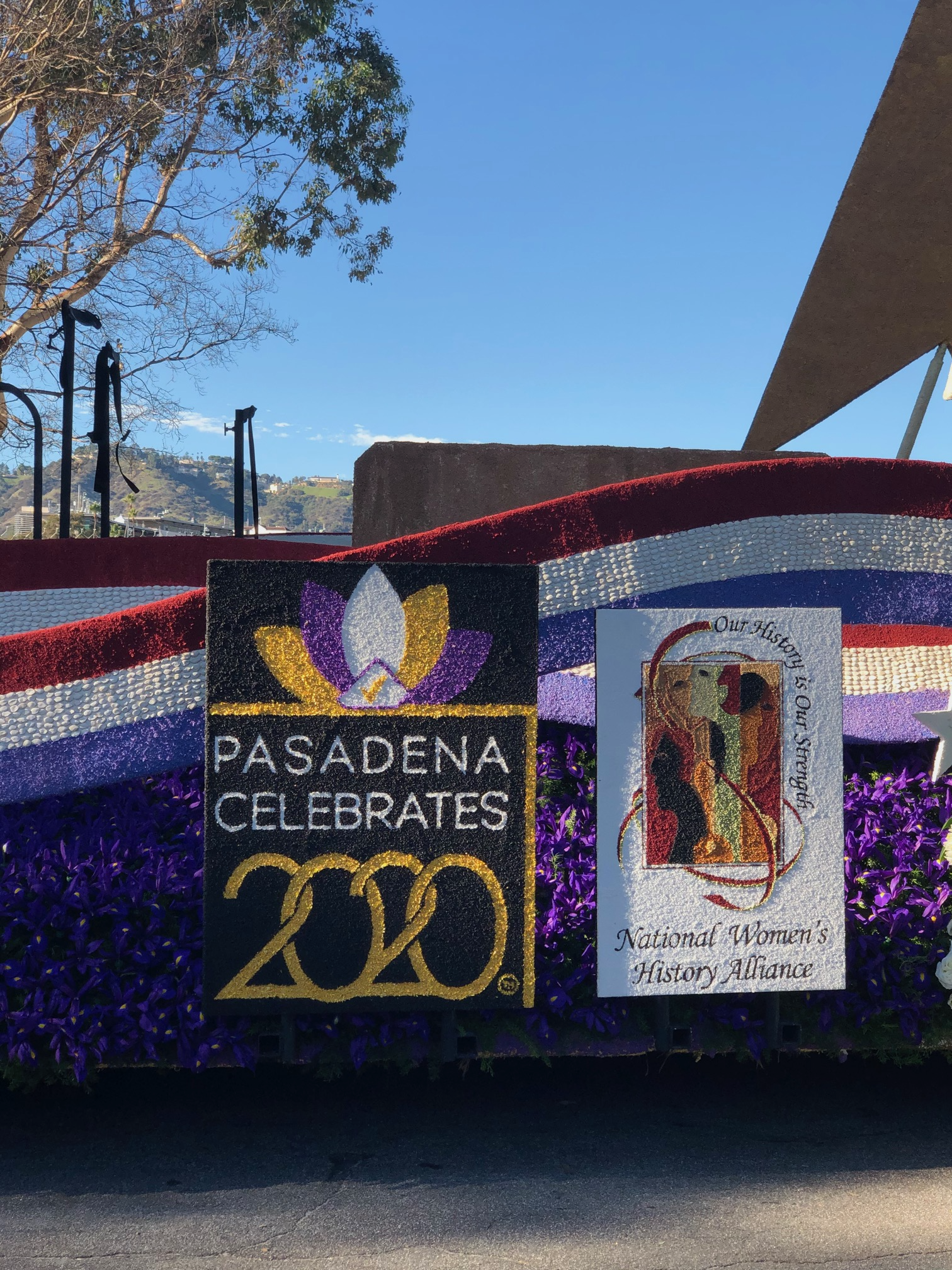
The 2020 Suffrage Centennial Float featuring the National Women's History Alliance

The NWHA mobilizes the national celebrations of Women's History Month in March each year by choosing an annual theme. They promote a multicultural women’s history perspective by honoring women of diverse cultural, ethnic, occupational, racial, class, and regional backgrounds. Every year the NWHA sends out 100,000 catalogs and distribute tens of thousands of women's history posters, celebratory materials, books, videos, and curriculum resources. The NWHA website has over 1,000,000 visitors a year. Additionally, the staff answers over 2,500 e-mails and letters each year from students, teachers, reporters, and other interested individuals requesting information. The staff has conducted women's history training sessions and women's historic site tours in 42 states, and has trained over 30,000 teachers and federal program managers and has delivered over 2,500 speeches. The NWHA created a national clearinghouse to provide multicultural women's history information, materials, referrals, and strategies. This service also provides easy access to women's history performers, organizations, museums, and historic sites. They have designed, developed, and produced more than 200 multicultural women’s history resource materials, such as videos, speeches, posters, celebratory items, guides, program kits, and curriculum units.

== Events in the 1990s ==
In 1995 and 1998, the NWHA led national campaigns to celebrate and recognize the work of women in expanding and enriching democracy. In 1995, they celebrated the 75th anniversary of women in the United States winning the right to vote and in 1998 the 150th anniversary of the Women's Rights Movement. In 2005, they celebrated the 85th anniversary of the ratification of the Nineteenth Amendment and the 25th anniversary of the women's history movement. In 2010 they marked the 90th anniversary of U.S. women gaining the right to vote. In 1997 the NWHA launched a website to serve as the digital clearinghouse for multicultural women's history information. Today, this award-winning website is the first women's history choice on all website search engines. The NWHA has worked with the President’s Commission on the Celebration of Women in American History. Executive director Molly Murphy MacGregor was appointed by the White House to serve on the Congressional Commission on Women's Historic Landmarks. The NWHA believes that "'Our History Is Our Strength"'

== Accomplishments ==
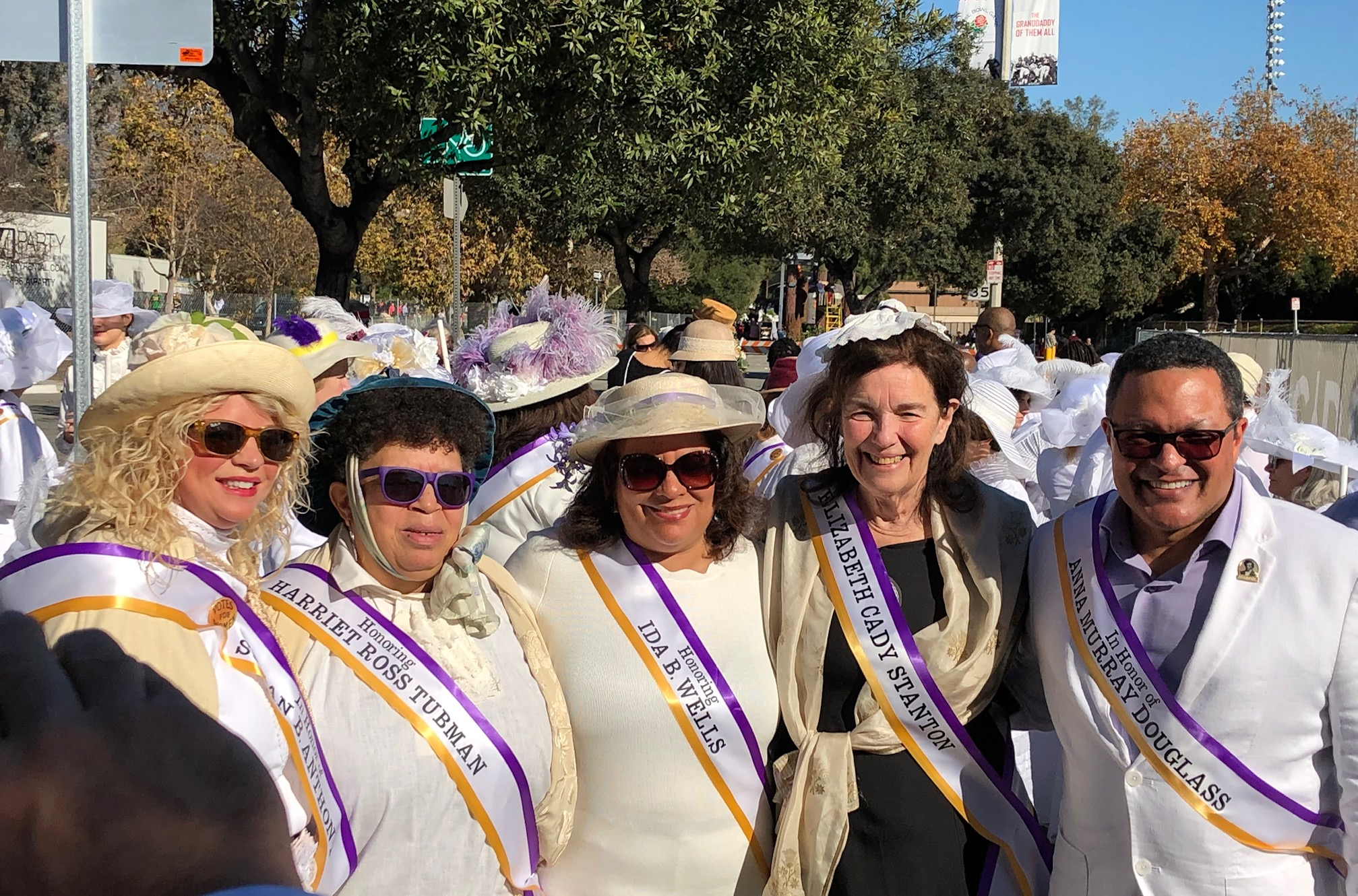
suffrage descendants who rode on the 2020 Rose Parade float

The National Women’s History Alliance has been recognized for its groundbreaking work in education and its many nationally recognized programs and services by organizations throughout the country, including:
• The National Association for Multicultural Education Award.
• The Jessie Bernard Wise Women Award from the Center for Women Policy Studies.
• The National Education Association’s prestigious Mary Hatwood Furtrell Award.
• The Myra Sadker Equity Award for their work in achievement in gender equity.

== Mission ==
The National Women’s History Alliance is an educational non-profit, non-partisan organization whose mission is to recognize and celebrate the diverse and historic accomplishments of women by providing information and educational materials and programs.

They explain their mission this way: "The impact of women’s history might seem abstract to some, and less pressing than the immediate struggles of working women today. But to ignore the vital role that women’s dreams and accomplishments play in our own lives would be a great mistake. We draw strength and inspiration from those who came before us – and those remarkable women working among us today. They are part of our story, and a truly balanced and inclusive history recognizes how important women have always been in American society."

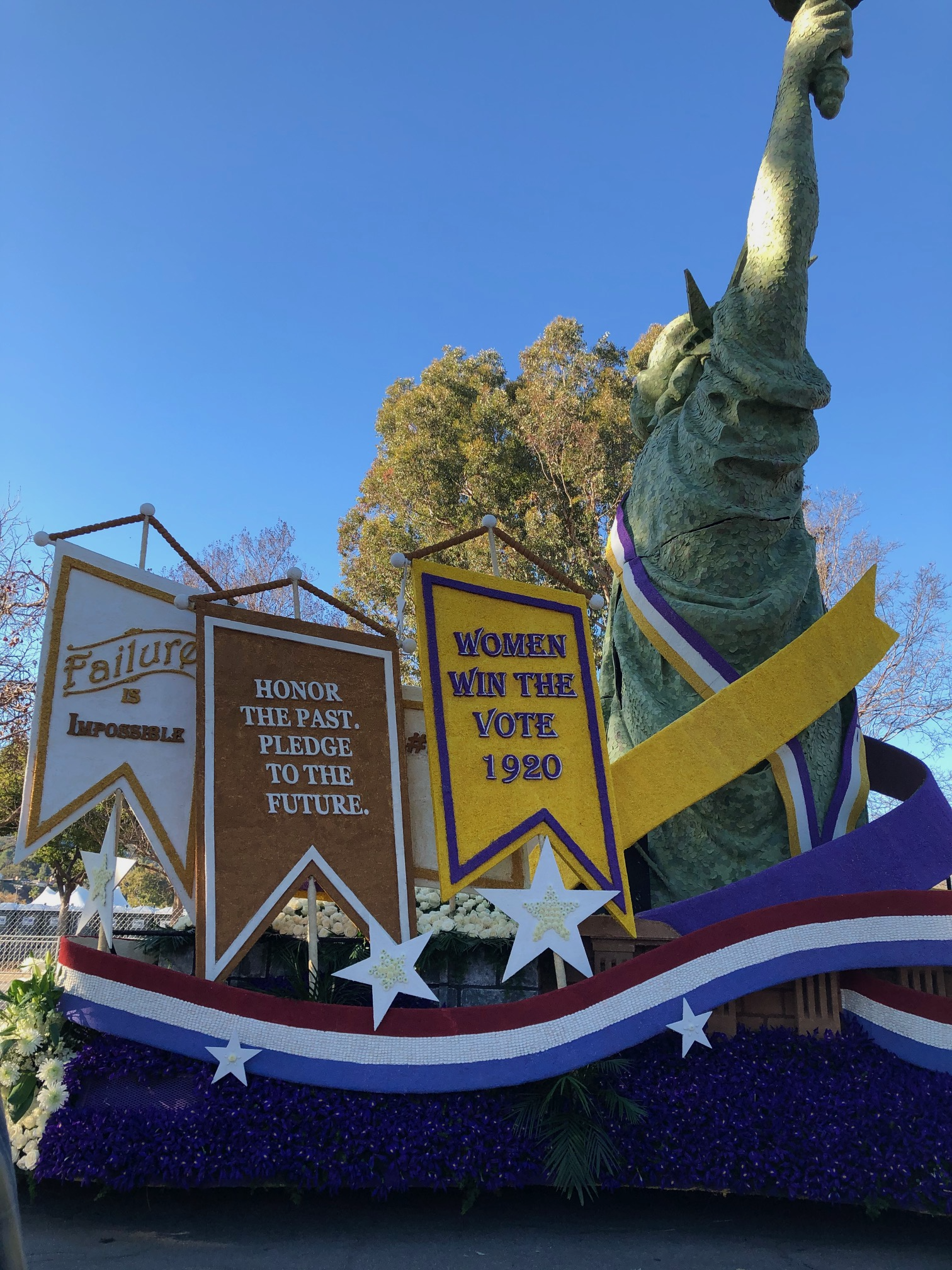
2020 Suffrage Centennial Rose Parade float

== Purpose ==
According to the NWHA, they promote women's history because "By walking history’s pathways, we learn to step forward with confidence. The legacy of how others shaped society sparks our own longings to contribute. Everyone needs role models — footsteps enough like our own to inspire us. History must tell the whole story. For girls, knowing women’s achievements expands their sense of what is possible. For all of us, knowledge of women’s strengths and contributions builds respect and nourishes self esteem — crucial to all children and adults now, and in the years to come."
The goal of the NWHA is to “make history accurate" by continuing to recognize and celebrate women’s authentic contributions through current and future projects.

== See also ==
- Molly MacGregor
- Martha Wheelock
- Zoe Nicholson

== Resources ==
- National Women's History Alliance Official Site.
- War Letters "Women's history during WWI and WWII"
- American Women's History "A resource guide"
