= Susan Derges =

British photographer

- Born: 1955 (age 70–71); London
- Known for: Camera-less photographic processes

River Taw, 19 January 1999, photograph, 76.2 cm x 30.5 cm by Derges

Susan Derges (born 1955) is a British photographic artist living and working in Devon. She specialises in camera-less photographic processes, most often working with natural landscapes. She has exhibited extensively in Europe, America and Japan and her works are in several important museum collections.

Derges' work is held in the collections of the Art Institute of Chicago, the Metropolitan Museum in New York, and the Victoria and Albert Museum in London. She has received an Honorary Fellowship of The Royal Photographic Society.

== Biography ==
Derges was born in London in 1955. Having studied basic theoretical physics, she draws playfully on certain scientific theories in her artworks, such as the notion that in physics the observer's decision affects what is observed. She began her artistic career as a painter working in London and Berlin in the 1970s, studying painting at the Chelsea College of Art and Design from 1973 to 1976 and at the Slade School of Art from 1977 to 1979. She moved to Japan in 1980, where she turned to certain early photographic processes, camera-less photography—exposing images directly onto photographic paper. These techniques she has continued to refine and develop to this day.

From 1981 to 1985 she lived and worked in Tokyo, Japan, receiving a Rotary Foundation Award (1981), JVC Award (1984) and carrying out postgraduate research at Tsukuba University. From 1986 to 1991 Derges lived in London, moving to Dartmoor, Devon in 1992. In 1993 she received a South West Arts Award and was appointed Lecturer in Media Arts at the University of Plymouth, Plymouth. From 1997 to 1999 she was an external examiner for the BA in Fine Art: Photography at Middlesex University.

== Work ==
Derges's 1991 series The Observer and the Observed explored the relationship between object and viewer, and art and science. Propelling a jet of water through the air, Derges used a strobe light to capture the suspended lens-like droplets set against a blurred image of her own face. During the 1990s, Derges became well known for her camera-less photographs—or photograms—of water. Using the landscape at night as her makeshift darkroom, Derges submerged large sheets of photographic paper in rivers, using a flashlight and the moon to create exposure.

Having trained in painting, Derges expressed an early interest in abstraction because "it offered the promise of being able to speak of the invisible rather than to record the visible". She turned to camera-less photography after experiencing frustration at the way "the camera always separates the subject from the viewer". Much of her subsequent work has dealt with this relationship – of separation and connectedness with the natural world. In Derges' photography, nature imprints patterns and rhythms of motion, growth and form directly on the light-sensitive surface of the photographic emulsion, such as falling water drops, busy honeycombs, and vessels of germinating toad's eggs.

Her images are often beautiful, conjuring metaphysical and metaphorical layers of meaning. Derges has said that ideas propelling her projects were "about becoming close to the element of the river, as a metaphor of immersion and participation." Her methods have been consistently experimental, a constant search for new camera-less methods of recording imagery, including the photogram, while directly connecting with the world she observes. Exploring the intuitive, she says, "I often have begin with something that is unknown to me that I have a sense I need to know about. I'm trying to dig into the unconscious and into the unknown... I begin with an intuition or a sense of an area that I want to explore but it is not fully conscious." Cycles of life, death and change, and their relationship to physical experience are explored through visual metaphors that borrow from science, nature, psychology, and art.

Derges first experimented with camera-less photography while living in Japan. Her 1985 work Chladni Figures was produced by sprinkling carborundum powder directly onto photographic emulsion where it was exposed to sound waves at different frequencies (see Ernst Chladni), creating ghostly black and white images of natural order and chaos.

For her 1991 series The Observer and the Observed Derges explored the interdependence of viewer and object – creating images appearing as droplets of water containing faces, while simultaneously showing her own face with small droplets suspended in her view.

For the 1997 River Taw series she worked at night, placing photographic paper on the river bed and allowing the images to be exposed through ambient light, aided by the use of a flash gun. Using the river near her Devon home as a lens, Derges captured fragments of ivy, ice, and debris reflected in or passing through the water. Her technique involved a very direct and unmediated physical relationship with the landscape, while her Under The Moon series involved working with photographs of the moon and combining these with water and branch patterns exposed to sound vibrations in the darkroom.

Her 2017 series Tide Pools was developed with the assistance from the department of Marine Biology at the University of Plymouth, where she served as Visiting Professor of Photography.

Her images, though based upon the capturing of external natural realities, take on a metaphorical dimension that echo the inner life of the unconscious and imaginative.

== Collections ==
Derges' work is held in the following permanent collections:

- The Gallery Of Sean Roche, Billingshurst, IL
- Art Institute of Chicago, Chicago, IL
- Metropolitan Museum, New York
- Victoria and Albert Museum, London

== Awards ==
- 2014: Honorary Fellowship of The Royal Photographic Society
- 2015 Centenary Medal of The Royal Photographic Society in recognition of outstanding contribution to the art of photography.

== Publications ==
- River Taw. London: Michael Hue-Williams Fine Art, 1997. ISBN 1900829045.
- Woman Thinking River. San Francisco: Fraenkel Gallery; New York: Danziger Gallery, 1999. ISBN 1881337065.
- Liquid Form, 1985–99. London: Michael Hue-Williams Fine Art, 1999. ISBN 190082907X. With an essay by Martin Kemp.
- Kingswood. Maidstone, Kent: Photoworks, 2000. ISBN 0953534049.
- Elemental. Göttingen: Steidl, 2010. ISBN 3869301503.
- Shadow Catchers: Camera-less Photography, Victoria & Albert Museum/Merrell, London, 2012. ISBN 978-1858945927

== General references ==
- Resurgence gallery with Susan Derges.
