= Wheelock's Latin =

Latin textbook

Latin
- Cover for Wheelock's Latin 6th Edition
- Author: Frederic M. Wheelock
- Language: English
- Subject: Latin
- Genre: Latin textbook
- Publisher: Barnes & Noble (originally), HarperCollins
- Publication date: 1956, 7th edition 2011
- Publication place: United States of America
- Media type: Print (Paperback, Hardcover)
- Pages: 564 + xliv
- ISBN: 978-0-06-199721-1 (7th Edition, Hardcover); 978-0-06-199722-8 (7th edition, paperback)
- OCLC: 60661105
- Dewey Decimal: 478.2/421 22
- LC Class: PA2087.5 .W44 2005
- Followed by: Wheelock's Latin Reader
- Website: wheelockslatin.com

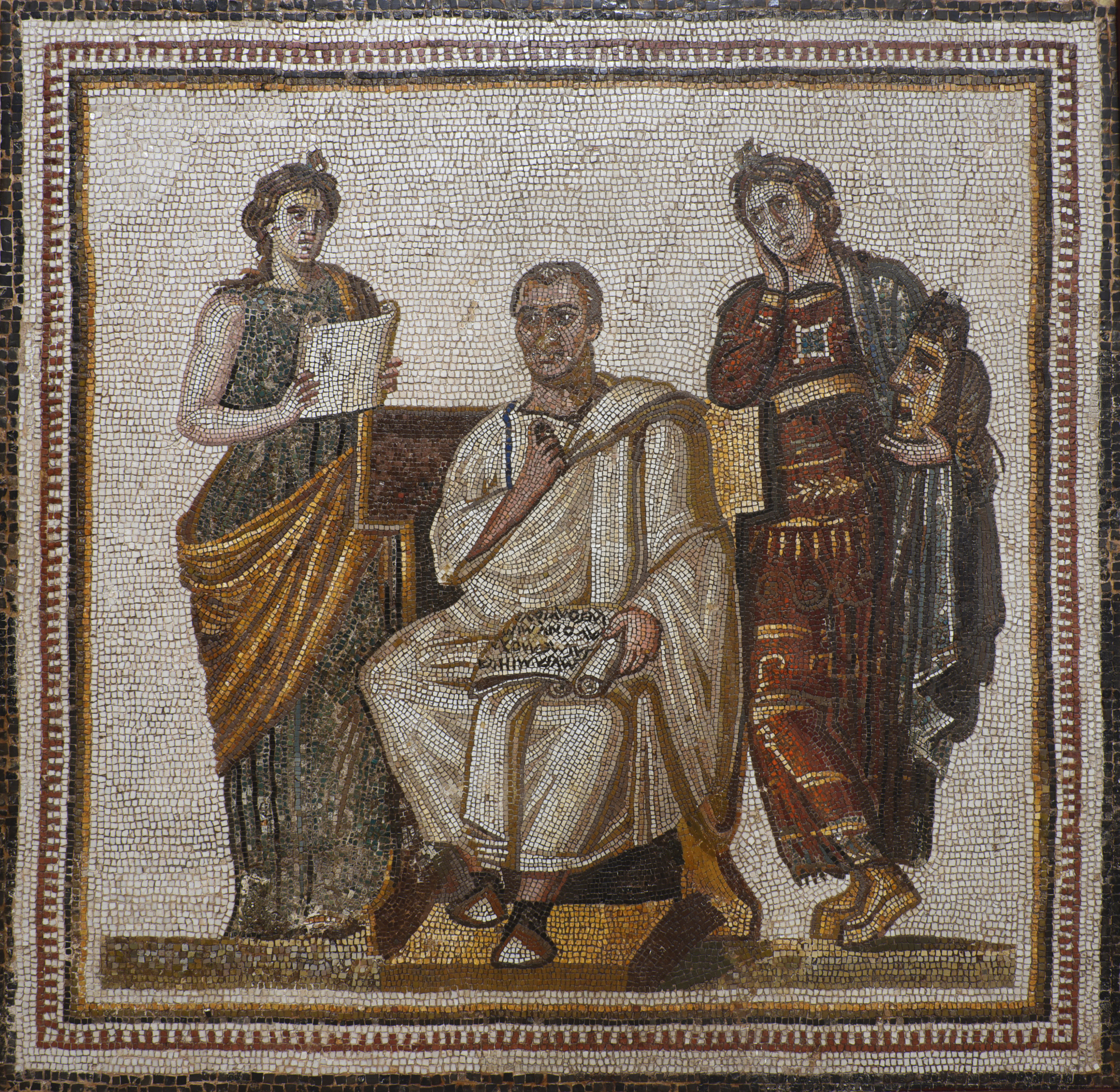
The Virgil Mosaic which is featured on the cover of 6th and 7th edition of Wheelock's Latin

Wheelock's Latin (originally titled Latin and later Latin: An Introductory Course Based on Ancient Authors) is a comprehensive beginning Latin textbook, originally written in 1956 by Frederic M. Wheelock and subsequently revised since the 1995 fifth edition by Richard A. LaFleur, the book is marketed as a middle ground between user-friendly and intensive Latin courses.

Chapters introduce related grammatical topics and assume little or no prior knowledge of Latin grammar or language. Each chapter has a collection of translation exercises created specifically for the book, most drawn directly from ancient sources. Those from Roman authors (Sententiae Antiquae—lit., "ancient sentences" or "ancient thoughts") and the reading passages that follow may be either direct quotations or adapted paraphrases of the originals. Interspersed in the text are introductory remarks on Ancient Roman culture. At the end of each chapter is a section called "Latina Est Gaudium — Et Utilis!", which means "Latin Is Fun — And Useful!" This section introduces phrases that can be used in conversation (such as "Quid agis hodie?", meaning "How are you today?"), and in particular comments on English words and their relation to Latin.

Originally written by Frederic M. Wheelock in 1956 and published by Barnes & Noble College Outline Series, the textbook was revised and updated by Richard A. LaFleur in 1995 with the 5th edition. The book is currently in its seventh edition.

The 6th edition has been translated into Korean (2005), with a Korean translation of the 7th edition pending; the 7th edition has been translated into Chinese (2017).

== Content ==
Wheelock's Latin seventh edition introduces with the following chapters:

- Foreward — An anecdote on the Wheelock family and a welcome to the book
- Preface — An introduction to book's chapter structure and education philosophy
- The Revised Edition — An explanation of new features of the seventh edition and a final note to students and instructors
- Intrōdvctiō (Introduction)
  - The Position of the Latin Language in Linguistic History — An etymological discussion of Latin's influence and place in the Indo-European languages
  - A Brief Survey of Latin Literature — An overview of epochs and authors of Rome and the Latin language from Archaic to present
  - The Alphabet and Pronunciation — A guide to the Latin alphabet and pronunciation; it features discussions on macrons, syllabification, vowels and consonants, diphthongs, and accents
- Maps — A map of ancient Italy, the Roman Empire, and Ancient Greece and the Aegean

Wheelock's Latin seventh edition contains forty chapters in all (listed as "capvt" followed by its roman numeral in the textbook); the chapter titles are listed below:

1. Verbs; First and Second Conjugations; Adverbs; Reading and Translating
2. First Declension Nouns and Adjectives; Prepositions, Conjunctions, Interjections
3. Second Declension Masculine Nouns and Adjectives; Apposition; Word Order
4. Second Declension Neuters; Adjectives; Present of Sum; Predicate Nominatives; Substantives
5. First and Second Conjugations: Future and Imperfect; Adjectives in -er
6. Sum and Possum; Complementary Infinitive
7. Third Declension Nouns
8. Third Conjugation: Present System
9. Demonstratives Hic, Ille, Iste; Special -īus Adjectives
10. Fourth Conjugation and -iō Verbs of the Third
11. Personal Pronouns Ego, Tū, and Is; Demonstratives Is and Īdem
12. The Perfect Active System; Synopsis
13. Reflexive Pronouns and Possessives; Intensive Pronoun
14. I-Stem Nouns of the Third Declension; Ablatives of Means, Accompaniment, and Manner
15. Numerals; Genitive of the Whole; Ablative with Numerals and Ablative of Time
16. Third Declension Adjectives
17. The Relative pronoun
18. First and Second Conjugations: Present System passive; Ablative of Agent
19. Perfect Passive System; Interrogative pronouns and Adjectives
20. Fourth Declension; Ablatives of Place from Which and Separation
21. Third and Fourth Conjugations: Present System Passive
22. Fifth Declension; Ablative of Place Where and Summary of Ablative Uses
23. Participles
24. Ablative Absolute; Passive Periphrastic; Dative of Agent
25. Infinitives; Indirect Statement
26. Comparison of Adjectives; Ablative of Comparison
27. Irregular Comparison of Adjectives
28. Subjunctive Mood; Present Subjunctive; Jussive and Purpose Clauses
29. Imperfect Subjunctive; Present and Imperfect Subjunctive of Sum and Possum; Result Clauses
30. Perfect and Pluperfect Subjunctive; Indirect Questions; Sequence of Tenses
31. Cum Clauses; Ferō
32. Formation and Comparison of Adverbs; Volō, Mālō, Nolō; Proviso Clauses
33. Conditions
34. Deponent Verbs; Ablative with Special Deponents
35. Dative with Adjectives, Special Verbs, and Compounds
36. Jussive Noun Clauses; Fīō
37. Conjugation of Eō; Place and Time Constructions
38. Relative Clauses of Characteristic; Dative of Reference; Supines
39. Gerund and Gerundive
40. -Ne, -Num, and Nōnne in Direct Questions, Fear Clauses; Genitive and Ablative of Description

Wheelock's Latin seventh edition contains the following additional resources:

- Locī Antīqvī (Ancient Passages) — A series of passages from ancient authors that are only minorly edited
- Locī Immv̄tātī (Unchanged Passages) — A series of completely-unedited (except for occasional omissions) passages
- Self-Tutorial Exercises — Additional exercises for each chapter for additional practice
- Key to Self-Tutorial Exercises — The answers for the above exercises
- Appendix
  - Some Etymological Aids — Features supplementary notes on phonetic change, prefixes, and suffixes
  - Supplementary Syntax — A list of additional syntax uncovered in the previous chapters
  - Svmmārivm Fōrmārvm (Summary of Forms) — A list of auxiliary paradigms, conjugations, and declensions
- Vocābvla (Vocabulary): English-Latin — A dictionary of English words and their Latin translations
- Vocābvla (Vocabulary): Latin-English — A dictionary of Latin words and their English translations
- Abbreviātiōnēs (Abbreviations) — A list of abbreviations used in the book
- Index — an alphabetical index of topics
- Location of the Sententiae Antīqvae (Ancient Sentences) — Citations for the Sententiae Antīqvae of the previous chapters
- About the Authors — A brief biography of Frederic M. Wheelock and Richard A. LaFleur
- Credits — Citations and credits of used works, such as art and grafitti, in previous chapters

== Publication history ==
- Wheelock F. M. - Latin. New York: Barnes & Noble, 1956. xxxiii & 301 p. College Outline Series #104. $1.95. Prof. Wheelock (1902-1987) was Professor of Humanities at Cazenovia Junior College at the time of publication.
- Wheelock F. M. - Latin: An introductory course based on ancient authors. 2nd ed. New York : Barnes & Noble, 1960. xxxiii & 377 p.
- Wheelock F. M. - Latin: An introductory course based on ancient authors. 3rd ed. New York : Barnes & Noble, 1963. xxxiii & 457 p. The Barnes & Noble Outline Series #104. Prof. Wheelock was Professor Emeritus of Classics at the University of Toledo at the time of publication.
- Wheelock F. M. - Wheelock's Latin Grammar. 4th ed., revised. New York : HarperCollins, 1992. xxvi & 418 p.
- Wheelock F. M. and R. A. LaFleur. Wheelock's Latin 5th Edition. New York: HarperCollins, 1995. xli & 498 p.
- Wheelock F. M. and R. A. LaFleur. Wheelock's Latin 6th Edition. New York: HarperCollins, 2000. l & 510 p.
- Wheelock F. M. and R. A. LaFleur. Wheelock's Latin 6th Edition, Revised. New York: HarperCollins, 2005. xlviii & 512 p.
- Wheelock F. M. and R. A. LaFleur. Wheelock's Latin 7th Edition (The Wheelock's Latin Series). New York: HarperCollins, 2011. xliv + 564 p. ISBN 978-0061997228.
