= Kurt Wendlandt =

German painter (1917–1998)

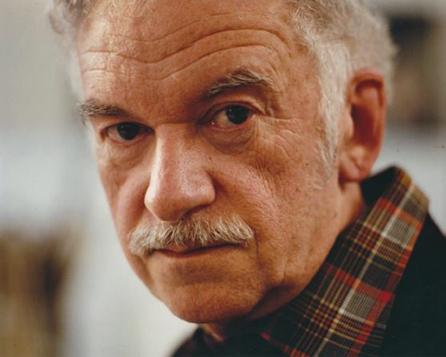
Kurt Wendlandt in 1993

Kurt Wendlandt (August 13, 1917 in Poznań – February 13, 1998 in Berlin) was a German painter, printmaker, photographer, author and illustrator. His work incorporates paintings, drawings, statuary, photogram, Décollage, light graphics and photos. Books illustrated by Wendlandt have been published in (Germany), the United Kingdom, the Netherlands, Austria, Sweden, Switzerland and the East Germany.

== Exhibitions (selection) ==
- 1942–44: Große Deutsche Kunstausstellung Haus der Kunst, Munich
- 1961: Retrospektive Rathaus Spandau, Berlin
- 1965: A 65 Amsterdam-Berlin-Frankfurt Haus des Deutschen Kunsthandwerks, Frankfurt, Germany
- 1968: Vom fototechnischen Experiment zur Neuen Figuration Galerie Clarissa, Hanover
- 1968: Foto-Grafik, Sammlung Clarissa Museum August Kestner, Hanover
- 1968: Sühnezeichen Aarhus, Copenhagen, Denmark
- 1969: Lichtgrafik Haus am Lützowplatz, Berlin
- 1969: Foto 69 Rhodes National Gallery, Salisbury (today: National Gallery of Zimbabwe), Harare, Zimbabwe
- 1970: Artes gráficas aplicadas à fotografia de Kurt Wendlandt Goethe-Institut, São Paulo and Rio de Janeiro, Brazil
- 1972: Zyklus OSSIAN Lottehaus, Wetzlar, Germany
- 1973: Akzente und Kontraste Kunstforum Ostdeutsche Galerie, Regensburg, Germany
- 1976: Lichtgrafik Goethe-Institut, Paris, France
- 1976: La VII Bienal de Ibiza Museo de Arte Contemporaneo, Ibiza, Spain
- 1977: Retrospektive Forum bildender Künstler, Essen
- 1977: Die Medien der bildenden Kunst Neue Nationalgalerie (National Gallery), Berlin
- 1980: Kunst in Berlin 1930–1960 Berlinische Galerie (State Museum of Berlin for Modern Art and Photography), Berlin
- 1985: Galerie des Lichts Berlin, Berlin
- 1988: Retrospektive Spandau Citadel, Berlin
- 1988: Neue Sammlungen Berlinische Galerie (State Museum of Berlin for Modern Art and Photography), Berlin
- 1989: Photographie als Photographie Berlinische Galerie, Berlin
- 1990: Abwesenheit. Fotogramme und die Kunst des 20. Jahrhunderts Kunsthaus Zürich, Zurich, Switzerland
- 1991: Interferenzen: Kunst aus Westberlin: 1960 – 1990 Latvian National Museum of Art, Riga, Latvia
- 1998: Lichtseiten Berlinische Galerie (State Museum of Berlin for Modern Art and Photography), Berlin, Germany
- 2010: Fotografische Verfahren Kunstmuseum Moritzburg, Halle (Saale), Germany
- 2016: NATURE MORTE, Museum of Contemporary Art of Crete, Crete, Greece
- 2017: Transparenz und Reflexion – 100 Jahre Kurt Wendlandt, Galerie Eirmos, Thessaloniki, Greece
- 2019: Isola d' Ischia GALLERY 1/1, San Jose, United States
- 2020: Material Inquiries Johanna Breede PHOTOKUNST, Berlin as part of the European Month of Photography

== Publications ==
As Author (selection)

- Elisa (together with Elfi Wendlandt), Herold, 1960
- Fumo, der Rauchgeist (together with Elfi Wendlandt), Parabel Verlag, 1962
- Die drei Königreiche, Sellier, 1971.
- Beiträge zu Integralen Weltsicht. Vol. VI., Internationale Jean Gebser Gesellschaft, Schaffhausen (Hrsg.) Willi Schlichter Atelier, 1986.
- Die 'Ent – Rüstung' der Athene. Die Entfaltung des menschheitlichen Bewußtseins, Druckerei Fuhl & Hornung, 1999

As Illustrator (Selection)

- Grimms Märchen, Brothers Grimm/Otto Hohenstatt, Schweizer Volks – Buchgemeinde, 1950
- Sidelights on Modern America, Helene Voigt und Helene Kirchhoff, Cornelsen Verlag, 1952
- Die Lederstrumpf-Erzählungen, Karl May, Droemer Verlag, 1954
- Die versunkene Insel, Noble Edward und Heinrich Hecke, Ueberreuter, 1954
- Der Fliegende Pfeil, Fritz Steuben, Kosmos (publisher), 1955
- Kommodore Hornblower auf allen Meeren, C. S. Forester, Verlag Carl Ueberreuter, 1956
- Märchen, Otto Hohenstatt, Union Deutsche Verlagsgesellschaft, 1959
- Ano lebt in der Tundra, Anna Dobrinskaja, Parabel Verlag, 1962
- Ben Ali und seine Herde, Karl Friedrich Kohlenberg, Union Deutsche Verlagsgesellschaft, 1963
- Märchen aus Tausendundeine Nacht, Walter Bauer, Union Deutsche Verlagsgesellschaft, 1963
- David in der heiligen Nacht, Urs Markus, Obpacher Verlag, Munich, 1964
- Die Nachtigall, Hans Christian Andersen, Broschek Verlag, Hamburg, 1969
- Der Kaiser und der Kleine Mann, Rudolf Otto Wiemer, Steinkopf, 1972
