= Virgil Mosaic =

Roman mosaic in the Bardo National Museum

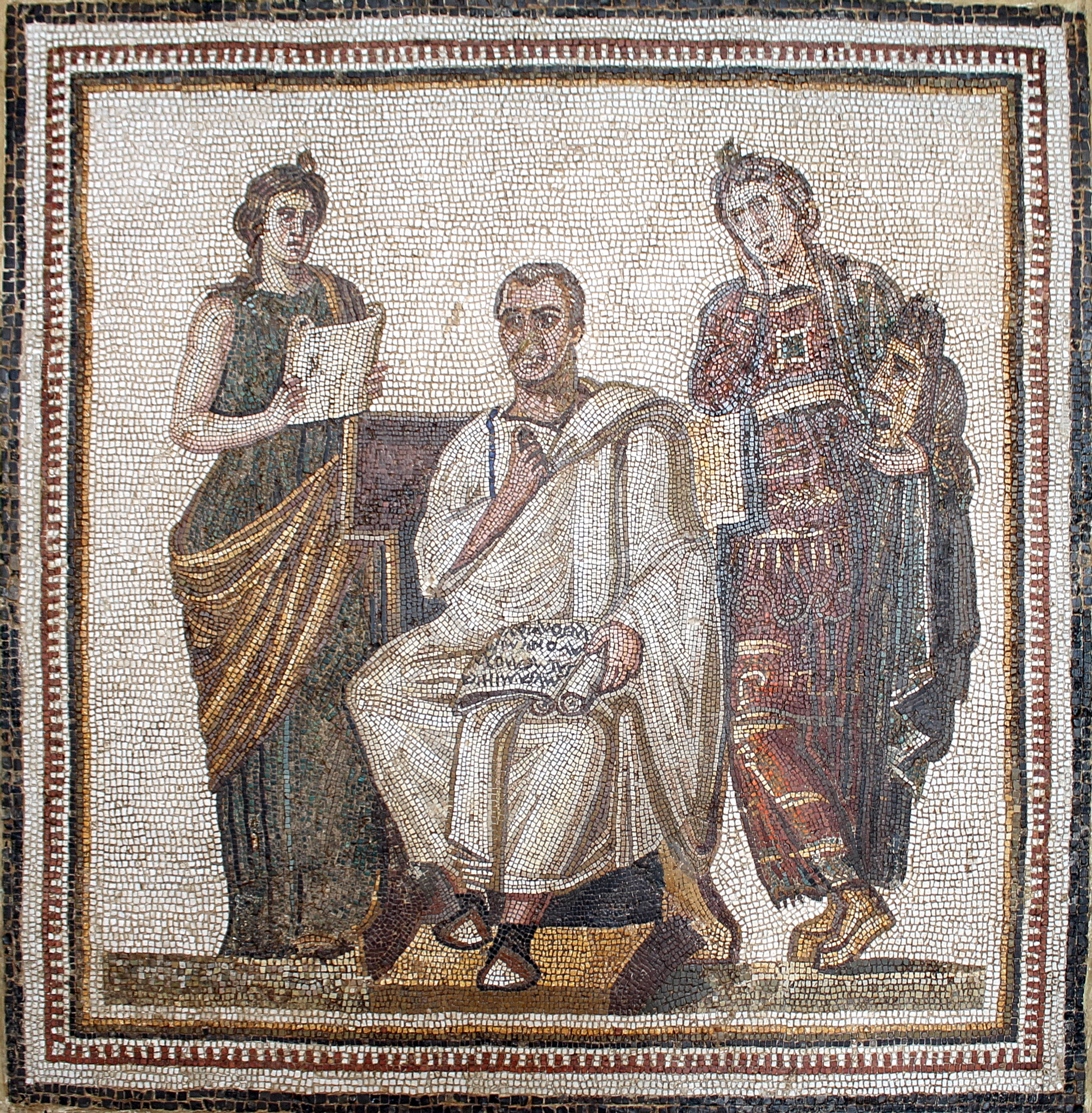
- Virgil Mosaic
- Artist: Unknown
- Medium: Mosaic
- Location: Bardo National Museum, Le Bardo

The Mosaic of Virgil is a mosaic found on the site of the ancient Hadrumetum and currently preserved in Bardo National Museum in Tunis, where it constitutes one of its key pieces. It is currently the oldest portrait of the Latin poet Virgil.

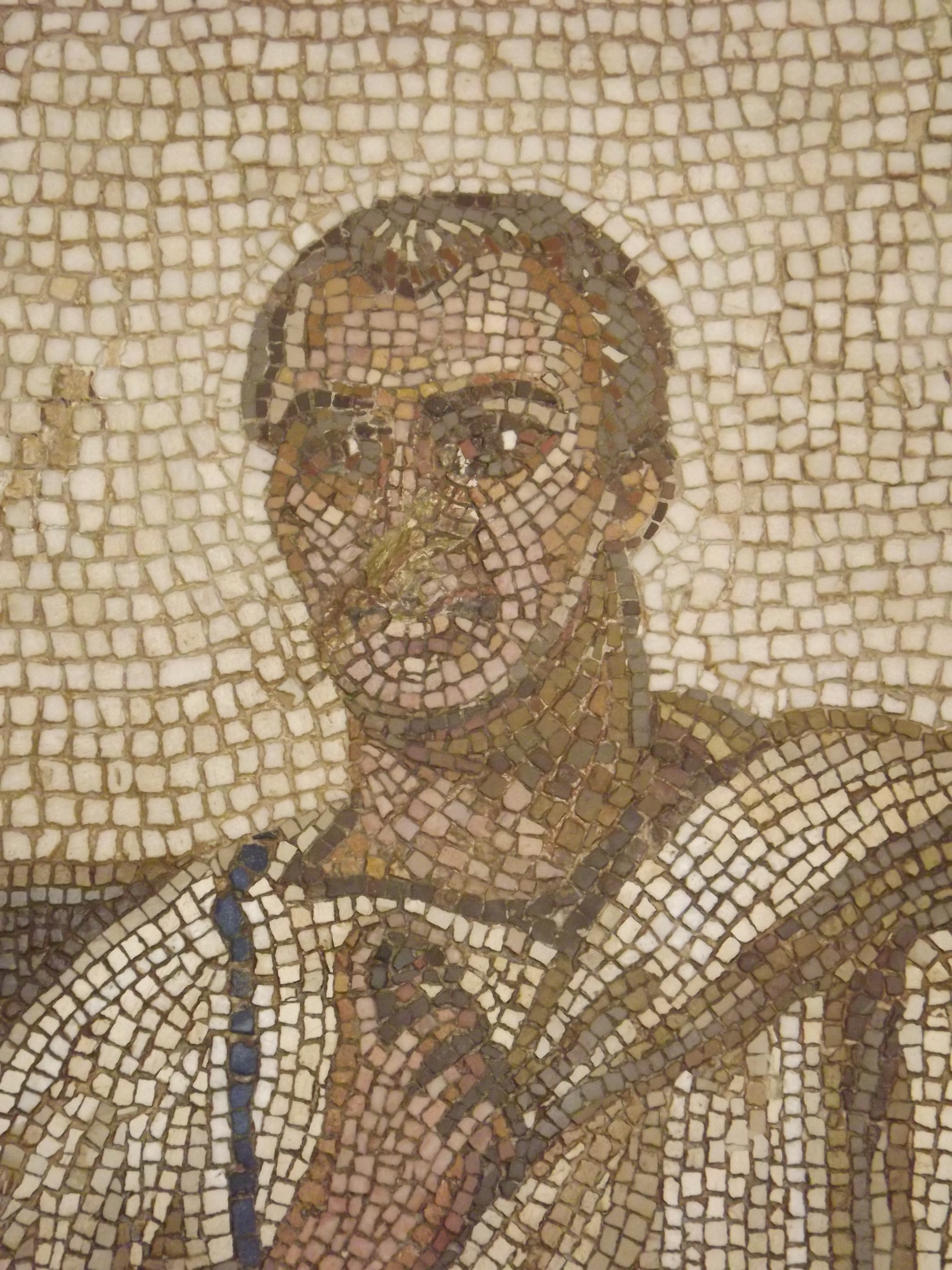
Close up

== History ==
The mosaic was discovered in 1896 in a garden of Sousse and constitutes the emblem of a larger mosaic.

== Description ==
It is included in a frame of 1.22-meter side.

=== Central character ===
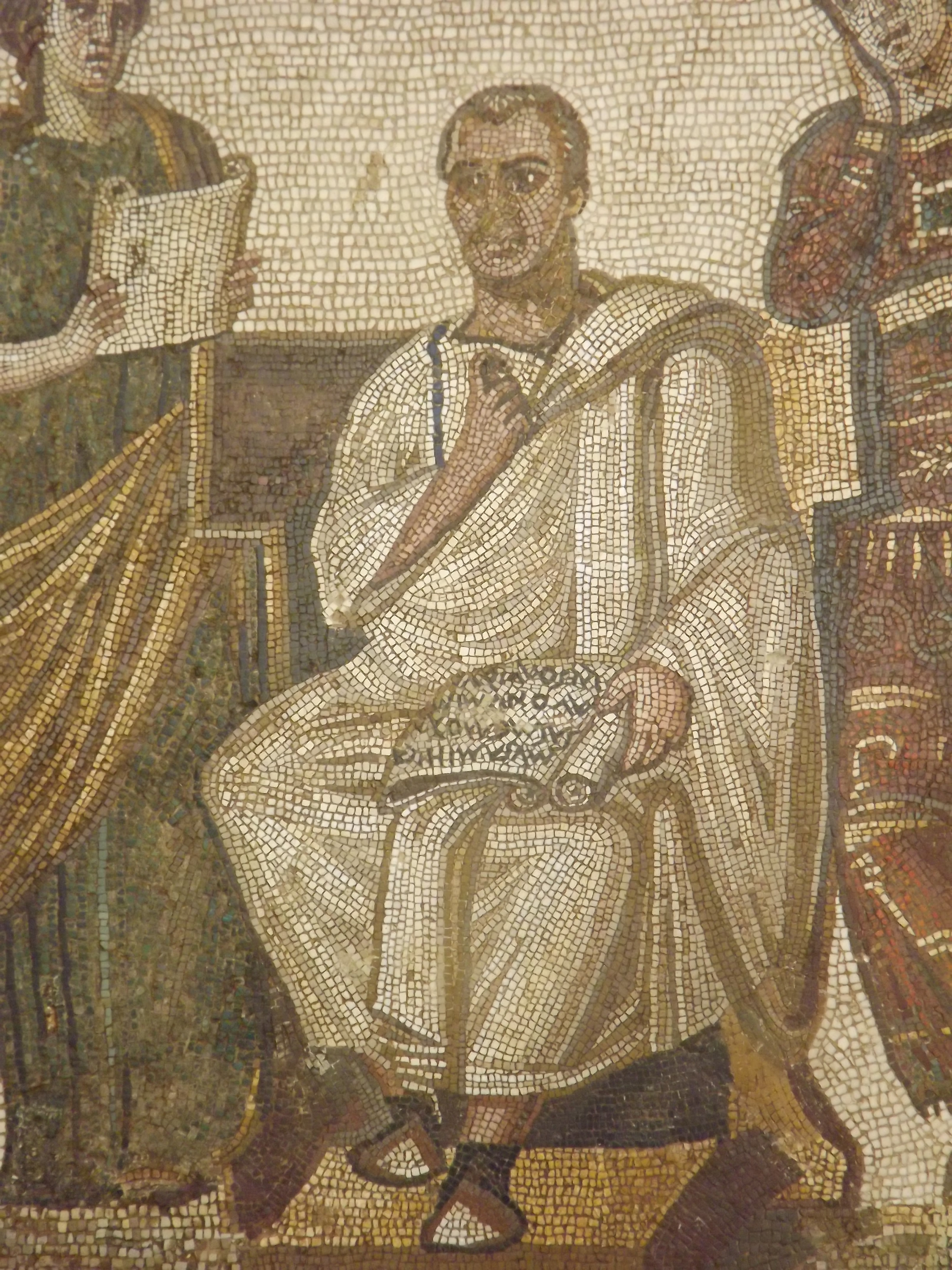
Detail of the central character identified as Virgil

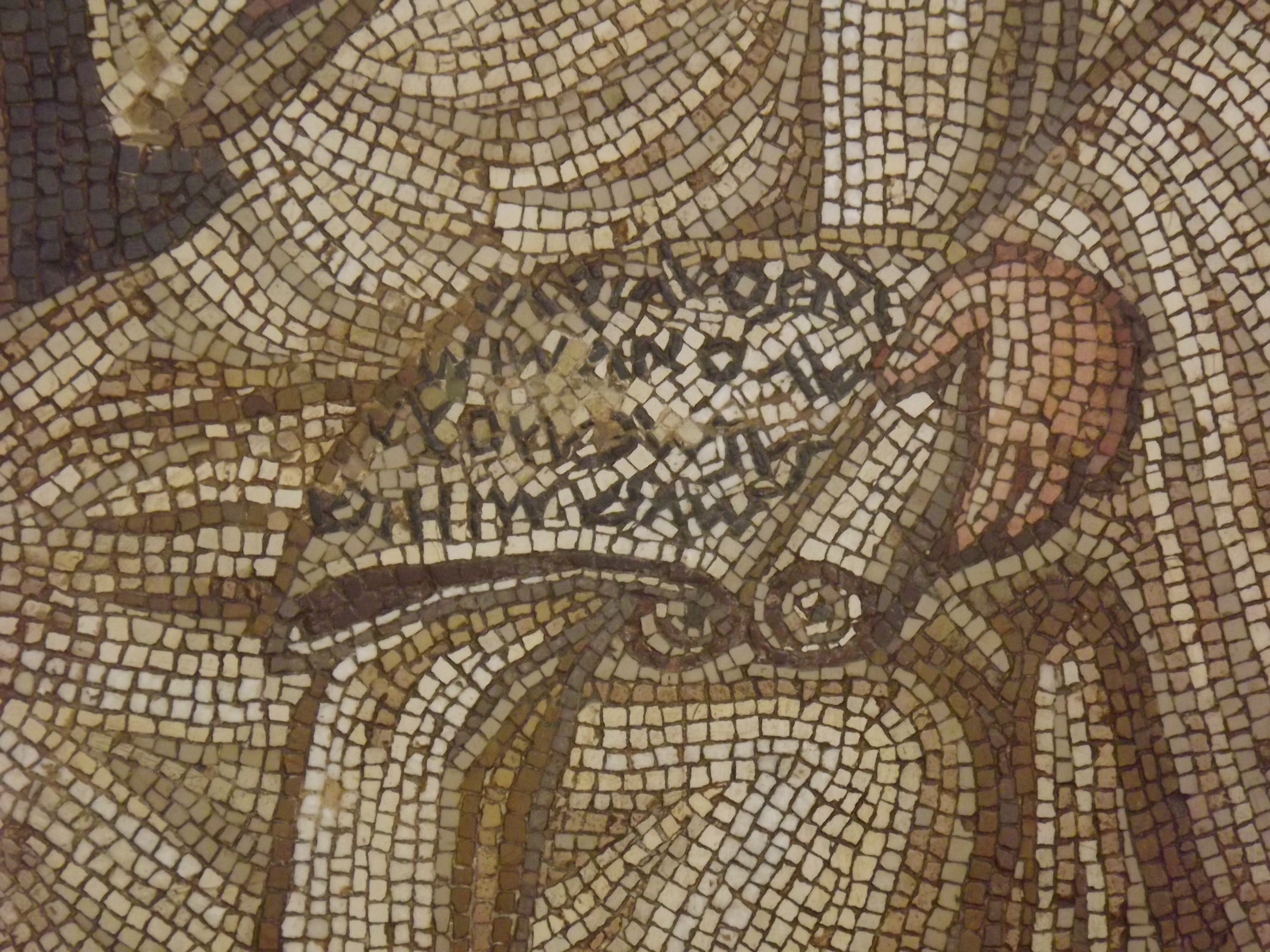
Detail of the parchment

It represents the Roman poet Virgil, dressed in a white toga decorated with embroidery.

The poet holds in his hand, which is placed on his knees, a roll of parchment on which are written extracts of the Aeneid, more precisely the eighth verse: "Musa, mihi causas memora, quo numine laeso, quidve..."

=== Muses ===
He is surrounded by the muses Clio and Melpomene: Clio, the muse of history, is placed on the left of the poet and shown reading, while Melpomene, the muse of tragedy, is holding a tragic mask.

== Interpretation ==
The work is the oldest known representation of the poet to date. Some have seen it, according to Mohamed Yacoub, a representation of the owner of the house, passionate about the poet. The dating of the pavement ranged from 1st to 4th century but can not exceed the 3rd century, due to the archaeological context of its discovery according to the same author.

== See also ==
- List of ancient Romans
- Outline of ancient Rome
- Roman mosaic
- Wheelock's Latin

== Bibliography ==
- Aïcha Ben Abed-Ben Khader, Le musée du Bardo, éd. Cérès, Tunis, 1992
- Mohamed Yacoub, Le Musée du Bardo : départements antiques, éd. Agence nationale du patrimoine, Tunis, 1993
- Mohamed Yacoub, Splendeurs des mosaïques de Tunisie, éd. Agence nationale du patrimoine, Tunis, 1995 ISBN 9973917235
