= Mary Ruthsdotter =

Feminist activist

Mary Ruthsdotter (October 14, 1944 - January 8, 2010) was a feminist activist who co-founded the National Women's History Project, for which she produced curriculum guides, teacher training programs and videos on women’s history. She played an influential role in obtaining Congressional resolutions and Presidential proclamations designating Women's History Week and, later, Women's History Month.

== Early life and education ==
Born Mary Pegau on October 14, 1944, in Fairfield, Iowa, Ruthsdotter lived in many places in her youth as her father, a U.S. Marine Corps pilot, was assigned to bases in Arizona, California, Florida, North Carolina, Texas, Virginia, and Taiwan. Settling in Los Angeles, she married Dave Crawford in 1964, taking his last name. She attended UCLA in the 1970s, earning a BA in urban geography. She became a feminist and changed her legal name to Ruthsdotter, in honor of her mother, Ruth Moyer, in 1978.

== Women’s history advocate ==
Ruthsdotter became an activist for women after moving from Los Angeles to Sonoma County, California in 1977. In 1980, she joined with Molly MacGregor, Bette Morgan, Paula Hammett, and Maria Cuevas to found the National Women’s History Project (NWHP). Working as a project director for 20 years, Ruthsdotter raised money for materials for students, teachers, and librarians. She wrote press releases promoting women’s history through radio, television, magazines, and newspapers. She gathered an extensive collection of the leading books and materials pertaining to women’s history and biography, making the NWHP the leading national resource on women’s history. She traveled extensively, making presentations, training teachers, and lobbying for the cause of women’s history.

The observance of Women’s History Week began in Sonoma County in 1978, timed to coincide with International Women’s Day on March 8. The idea caught on across the country. By 1981, National Women’s History Week had been designated by the U.S. Senate and 24 governors and state legislatures, and President Jimmy Carter had issued a proclamation. The U.S. Congress passed a joint resolution declaring Women’s History Week in March 1982. In 1987, Women’s History Week was expanded to a month, with a proclamation from President Ronald Reagan.

Ruthsdotter also served as the chair of the Sonoma County Commission on the Status of Women, and worked three years as an aide to state assemblywoman (later state senator) Pat Wiggins. She was a supporter of progressive causes and politicians, including Congresswoman Lynn Woolsey. She backed the creation of a National Women's History Museum on the National Mall in Washington, DC.

After living in Windsor and Santa Rosa, she and her husband were among the founders of the Two Acre Wood cohousing community in Sebastopol, California, where they have lived since 2000. Following her retirement in 2004, Ruthsdotter developed multiple myeloma. She died suddenly of congestive heart failure in January 2010.
