= Darrow School =

Coordinates: 42°27′10.94″N 73°22′58.49″W

The Darrow School

Location
- 110 Darrow Road; New Lebanon, New York 12125; United States

Information
- Type: Private, day, boarding, college preparatory
- Religious affiliation: Nonsectarian
- Founded: 1932
- Status: Open
- Chairperson: Edwin Selden
- Head of school: Andrew J. Vadnais
- Staff: 52
- Teaching staff: 31
- Grades: 9-12, PG
- Gender: Co-educational
- Enrollment: 110
- Average class size: 8-9
- Student to teacher ratio: 4:1
- Hours in school day: 7
- Campus size: 365 acres (1.48 km^{2})
- Campus type: Rural
- Houses: Ann Lee, Brethrens', Hinckley, Neale, Meacham
- Colors: Maroon & White
- Song: "Simple Gifts"
- Athletics: Basketball, cross-country, lacrosse, soccer, softball, tennis, ultimate frisbee, outdoor education, alpine skiing, fitness
- Athletics conference: HVAL, NEPSAC
- Mascot: Duck
- Nickname: Ducks
- Team name: Darrow Ducks
- Accreditation: MSACS
- Publication: Peg Board
- Endowment: $3 million
- School fees: Boarding fee: $365; Day fee: $50
- Tuition: Boarding: $67,950; Day: $42,800
- Affiliation: NAIS, TABS, NYSAIS, NYBSA
- Website: www.darrowschool.org

Darrow School is a private, co-educational, college-preparatory school located in New Lebanon, New York. The school serves boarding and day students in grades 9-12 and PG (post-graduate).

== History ==
Darrow opened in the fall of 1932 as the Lebanon School for Boys. In 1938 president Charles S. Haight died and C. Lambert Heyniger purchased the school, becoming its headmaster and treasurer. Heyniger was a Princeton alumnus who had taught as a missionary in China and then pursued graduate study at Columbia University before joining General Motors. He renamed the school in the Shaker tradition, after a family prominent among the religious colony.

In 1963, three Darrow students set a fire and destroyed the century-old dining hall and fire leveled the 156-year-old gymnasium. Both fires threatened dormitories housing 175 pupils. The boys had hoped school officials would send all the pupils home until repairs were made.

In late 2023, the school's precarious financial situation almost led to closure.

== Campus ==
The campus is situated on the original site of the Mount Lebanon Shaker Village, a National Historic Landmark. It spans over 365 acres of land, with 26 buildings, tennis courts, playing fields, ponds, orchards, pastures, marshlands, and a vast forest.

== Student body ==
The school currently enrolls 110 students from across the United States and beyond.

== Financial problems ==
In the wake of the COVID-19 pandemic in the early 2020s, Darrow was experiencing severe financial problems, including a $2 million operating deficit which threatened the school's survival. Revenues were down substantially as a result of generous financial aid packages awarded to students and families, a decline in the number of full-pay international students and "donor fatigue" on the part of the school's traditional benefactors. Darrow trustees subsequently signaled their support for the closure of the school.

The school was later saved at the 11th hour after its alumni raised nearly $5 million. Darrow subsequently lined up a group of partners and investors, enabling the school to purchase the former Berkshire Farm Center two miles away in Canaan, New York, for $15.3 million. The property will be used as a second campus and will allow Darrow to more than double its enrollment.

== Athletics ==
Student participate in a number of competitive and non-competitive sports:

- Fall
  - Cross-country
  - Soccer
  - Outdoor education
  - Mixed martial arts
- Winter
  - Girls varsity basketball
  - Boys varsity basketball
  - Boys prep basketball
  - Alpine
- Spring
  - Lacrosse
  - Softball
  - Outdoor education
  - Esports

== Notable alumni ==
- Gerald A Cann, Assistant Secretary of the Navy, Class of 1949
- Charles "Pete" Conrad, Jr., Apollo 12 commander and third man to walk on the Moon, Class of 1949
- Michael Flomen, artist, attended 1969-1971
- August François von Finck, German businessman
- Sam Harper, screenwriter of Cheaper by the Dozen and Cheaper by the Dozen 2. Class of 1974
- William H. Hudnut III, mayor of Indianapolis
- Christopher Lloyd, actor
- Donald Cushing McGraw, Jr., businessman, Class of 1943
- Chris "Mad Dog" Russo, radio personality, Class of 1978
- David Henry Sterry, writer

== Notable faculty/staff ==
- Antonio Anderson
- Frederic M. Wheelock
- Leah Penniman
