= Molly Murphy MacGregor =

American educator

- Education: Sonoma State University
- Occupations: Women's Rights Activist, Historian
- Organization: National Women's History Alliance

Molly Murphy MacGregor is one of the co-founders of the National Women's History Project, now known as the National Women's History Alliance. Her work contributed to the creation of Women's History Month, which is recognized every year in March.

== Co-founding the National Women's History Project ==
Under MacGregor and other co-founders leadership, in 1978 the Education Task Force of the Sonoma County Commission on the Status of Women organized a week long celebration for women's history. MacGregor co-founded the National Women's History Project in 1980 with several other women including Mary Ruthsdotter in order to promote awareness about women's history throughout the United States. Over the last three decades, the NWHP has hosted countless events and historic projects to celebrate women's history. They successfully lobbied Congress to pass a joint resolution recognizing women's history month in 1987. Numerous scholars and historians have worked with the NWHP including historian Robert P. J. Cooney Jr. He is a frequent contributor to NWHP projects and his work is currently cited on the California Secretary of State page. The NWHP had a major push toward the inclusion of women's history at the K-12 level. MacGregor has been quoted as saying, "The validation has been the most surprising and overwhelming success of Women’s History Month. It first started at K-12, we had no idea how much effect it would have on the community and government.” In her 1999 article, "Living the Legacy of the Women's Rights Movement" published in The Public Historian, she wrote extensively about the widespread interest the NWHP has seen from students and teachers. MacGregor has noted the National Park Service has done extensive work to promote the history of the women's rights movement. MacGregor is frequently asked to speak in public about her work with the NWHP. In 2005 served in a keynote session titled “Democracy and Women’s Equal Rights - Mutually Exclusive” which celebrated the 85th anniversary of the 19th amendment at the National Constitution Center.

== Involvement with the National Women's History Alliance ==
MacGregor serves as the executive director of the organization which is now known as the National Women's History Alliance. The National Women's History Alliance is the only national clearing house coordinating projects, speakers and curriculum about women's history. The NWHA regularly hosts events to promote the field of women's history and publishes a yearly list of honorees related to the field of women's history. Their theme for 2019 is "Visionary Women" Champions of Peace & Nonviolence". Leasa Graves works closely with MacGregor and currently serves as the assistant director. The organization is currently coordinating a statewide effort in California to plan a wide variety of projects celebrating the centennial of the 19th amendment. Numerous projects are in the works including recognizing suffragists buried in California. Committee members of the NWHA recently visited Cypress Lawn Cemetery in San Bruno, California where Phoebe Hearst and Gertrude Atherton are buried to put markers on their grave sites noting their work as suffragists. MacGregor frequently speaks to organizations such as the American Association of University Women about a wide range of topics related to women's history. MacGregor is often called upon to share her opinions regarding the portrayal of women in the media. In 2009 when interviewed about the new biopic about Amelia Earhart, MacGregor was quoted as saying, "You cannot underestimate the power of a role model or knowing that someone else did it...female role models are extremely important."

== Personal life ==
MacGregor is a former educator with a background in teaching social studies, English and women's history. While teaching U.S. history at the high school level, she developed an interest in educating others about women's history. She attended graduate school at Sonoma State University. She also taught courses in women's history at Santa Rosa Junior College and worked with noted women's historian Gerda Lerner.
