= Museum of Fine Arts Named after the Nevzorov Family =

Museum in Semey, Abai, Kazakhstan

- Невзоровтар отбасы атындағы бейнелеу өнері мұражайы
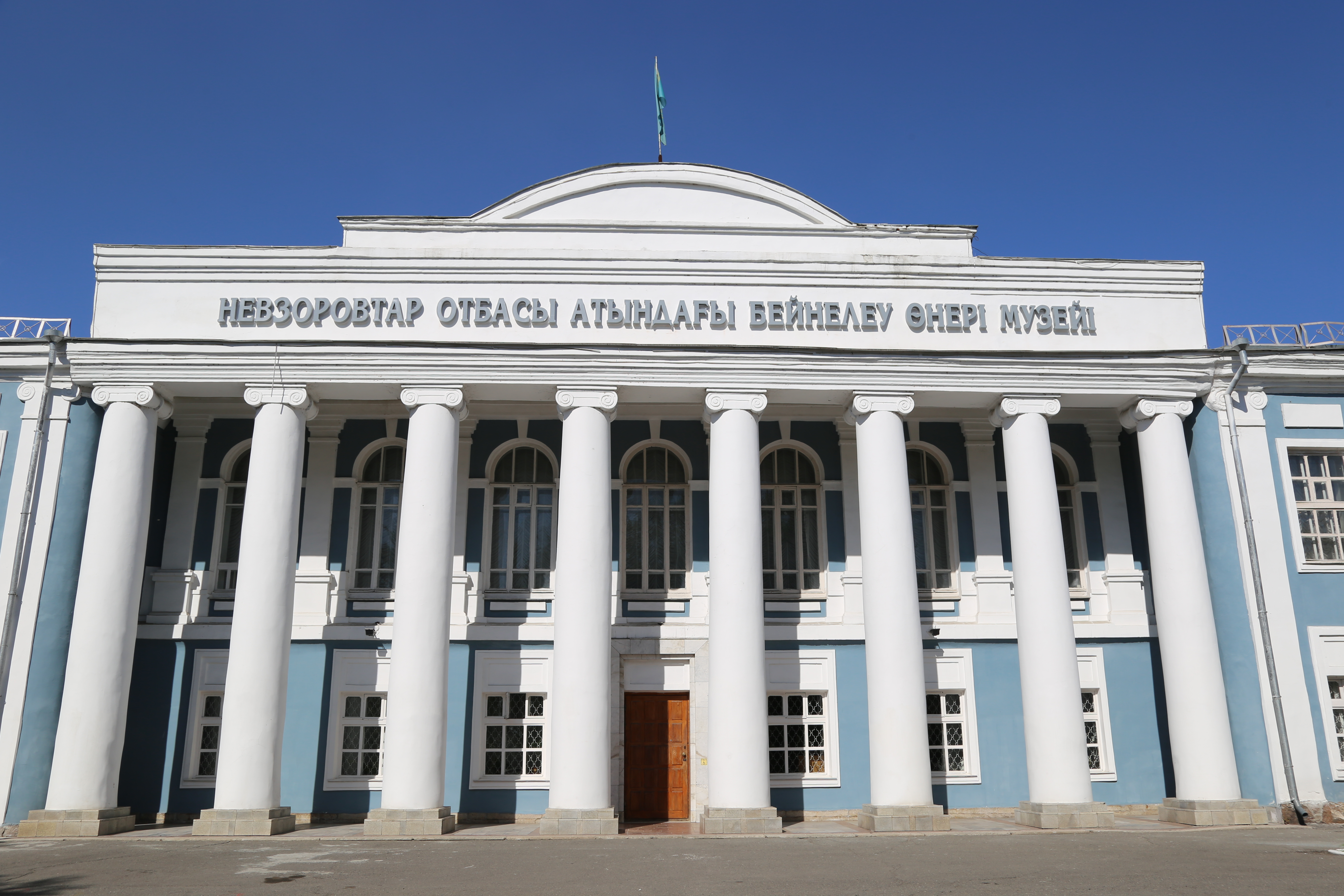

- Location within Kazakhstan
- Established: 1985
- Location: Semey, Abai Region, Kazakhstan
- Coordinates: 50°24′06.9″N 80°15′12.7″E
- Type: art museum
- Collection size: 3,600
- Website: Official website

The Museum of Fine Arts Named after the Nevzorov Family (Kazakh: Невзоровтар отбасы атындағы бейнелеу өнері мұражайы, romanized: Nevzorovtar otbasy atyndağy beineleu önerı mūrajaiy) is an art museum in Semey, Abai Region, Kazakhstan.

== History ==
The museum was established in 1985. It became an independent institution in 1998.

== Architecture ==
The museum features a library which consists of around 11,000 volumes.

== Exhibitions ==
The museum has a collection of more than 3,600 works of arts.

== See also ==
- List of museums in Kazakhstan
