= Jennifer Couëlle =

Montreal-based children's book author

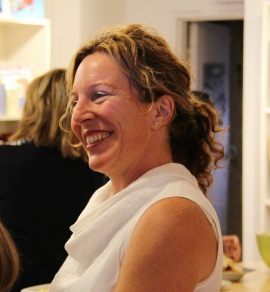
- Born: Italy
- Education: Université du Québec à Montréal, McGill University
- Occupations: Writer, children's writer
- Website: jennifercouelle.com

Jennifer Couëlle (born in Italy) is a children's book author based in Montreal, Canada. Her albums and collections of poems have been published in France and Canada.

== Biography ==
Couëlle is granddaughter of the French architect Jacques Couëlle, and daughter of the painter Jérôme Couëlle. She is an art historian. She completed her master's thesis on "Kitsch as a Modernist Device" at the Université du Québec à Montréal in 1991.

From 1989 to 2001, she was an art and theater critic for numerous publications, including art press, Canadian Art, Cahiers de théâtre Jeu, Variable Sky, Sculpture Space, Esse, ETC, Parachute, Possibles, Spirale and Vie des arts. She has also been a cultural journalist for Le Devoir, Elle Québec and La Presse.

During this period, she also curated several exhibitions, including L'Empreinte du vide (André Jasinski), Mois de la photo in Montreal, Galerie Clark and Galerie Trois Points (1999); Antidote (lightness at work), and Galerie Plein Sud (1998); Tattoos (Mark Garland), Gallery B-312 (1997) and Louis Muhlstock, The Draftsman / Un dessinateur at the Saidye Bronfman Arts Center (1989).

== Works in French ==
- Le cœur dans la tête, Éditions Pour penser à l'endroit, Cholet, 2005 ISBN 2-915125-11-2
- La souris qui vit plus loin que le bout de son nez, Éditions Pour penser à l'endroit, Cholet, 2005 ISBN 2-915125-10-4
- Un chat sous les draps, Planète rebelle, Montréal, 2007 ISBN 978-2-922528-70-1
- "Poèmes", Riveneuve Continents n° 6, Riveneuve Éditions, Paris, 2008 ISBN 978-2-914214-36-0
- Ballons au ciel, Planète rebelle, Montréal, 2008 ISBN 978-2-922528-80-0
- "Garçon à la mer", Riveneuve Continents n° 8, Riveneuve Éditions, Paris, 2009 ISBN 978-2-914214-80-3
- Je t'aime comme toi, Planète rebelle, Montréal, 2009 ISBN 978-2-922528-93-0
- C'est bleu c'est vert, Planète rebelle, Montréal, 2009 ISBN 978-2-923735-01-6
- Coucou bonheur !, Planète rebelle, Montréal, 2010 ISBN 978-2-923735-09-2
- Noël : Biscuits pas cuits et autres récits, Éditions de la Bagnole, Montréal, 2011 ISBN 978-2-923342-65-8.
- Mon meilleur meilleur ami, Planète rebelle, Montréal, 2011 ISBN 978-2-923735-24-5
- Princesse Paola à la maternelle, Planète rebelle, Montréal, 2012 ISBN 9782923735610
- Cent enfants imaginent comment changer le monde, Éditions de la Bagnole, Montréal, 2013 ISBN 9782897140090
- Palin – Un caprice au dentifrice, Éditions de la Bagnole, Montréal, 2013 ISBN 9782897140137
- Palin – Une sortie sens dessus dessous, Éditions de la Bagnole, Montréal, 2013 ISBN 9782897140144
- Papoumamie, Planète rebelle, Montréal, 2013 ISBN 978-2-92417-403-6
- Palin – Le tricot rouge, Éditions de la Bagnole, Montréal, 2013 ISBN 978-2-89714-048-9
- Palin – Je veux un animal de compagnie !, Éditions de la Bagnole, Montréal, 2013 ISBN 978-2-89714-047-2
- La magie de Sami, Planète rebelle, Montréal, 2014 ISBN 978-2-924174-10-4
- Le bisou, Dominique et Compagnie, Saint-Lambert, 2014 ISBN 978-2-89686-955-8
- L’homme sans chaussettes, éditions de l’Isatis, Montréal, 2015 ISBN 978-2-924309-40-7
- Peinture comme printemps, Dominique et compagnie, Saint-Lambert, 2017 ISBN 978-2-89739-737-1
- Sans manches comme l'été, Dominique et compagnie, Saint-Lambert, 2017 ISBN 978-2-89739-679-4
- Tricoté comme l'automne, Dominique et compagnie, Saint-Lambert, 2017 ISBN 978-2-89739-927-6
- Ange comme hiver, Dominique et compagnie, Saint-Lambert, 2017 ISBN 978-2-89739-682-4
- Le monde de Méry, Dominique et compagnie, Saint-Lambert, 2019 ISBN 978-2-89785-764-6
- Espoir, Dominique et compagnie, Saint-Lambert, 2020 ISBN 978-2-89785-948-0

== Works in English ==
- Kiss, Kiss translation of Le Bisou by Karen Simon, illustrator Jacques Laplante. Pajama ISBN 978-1-927485-86-6
