= Adam Fuss =

British photographer (born 1961)

- Born: 1961 (age 64–65); England
- Education: Ogilvy & Mather (apprentice)
- Known for: Photograms, pinhole camera photography
- Awards: ICP Infinity Award for Art (2000); Honorary Fellowship, Royal Photographic Society (2016)

Adam Fuss (born 1961) is a British photographer.

== Early life ==
Adam Fuss was born in England in 1961. His father manufactured women's coats and his mother was an Australian fashion model. Fuss's father suffered a stroke in 1963 and required constant care until his death in 1968. Fuss lived in Australia with his mother from 1967 to 1970 and again from 1971 to 1973. In 1980, he returned to Australia and began his career as a photographic apprentice at the Ogilvy & Mather Agency. In 1982 he moved to New York City and took a series of odd jobs, including that of a waiter in an art cafe and for parties at the Metropolitan Museum of Art. Fuss began a series of pinhole-camera images in 1984 and began exhibiting his work in 1985 at Massimo Audiello's gallery. His works have since been exhibited in major museums and galleries around the world. He is known for photographing unusual subject matter with an emphasis on composition.

== Images and technique ==
Fuss has embraced a range of historical and contemporary photographic techniques to capture a broad set of emotion-laden subject matter. Art critics often describe the artist's work as speaking to the ephemerality of a moment in time and life itself. Fuss's images have depicted babies, water droplets, christening dresses, moving light, snakes, sunflowers, rabbit entrails, and human skulls. Perhaps Fuss's best known images are those of babies on their backs in shallow baths of water with ripples and droplets of water capturing their motion. His most recent images (since 2003) have included concentric waves originating from a single water droplet (the "Ark" series), butterfly chrysalises, powder trails made by live snakes, and autobiographical childhood images.

== Publications ==
- Adam Fuss, Thomas Kellein, David Galloway (2003). Adam Fuss. New York: Distributed Art Publishers. ISBN 978-1-891024-76-4
- Adam Fuss, Jerry Kelly (2002). My Ghost. Twin Palms Publishers. ISBN 978-0-944092-73-6
- Eugenia Parry, Adam Fuss (1997). Adam Fuss. Santa Fe, NM: Arena Editions. ISBN 978-0-9657280-1-0
- Fuss, Adam (1996). "Pinhole Photographs: Photographs". Washington: Smithsonian Institution Press. ISBN 978-1-56098-622-5

== Exhibitions ==
- Buffalo AKG Art Museum, Buffalo, New York, "Adam Fuss: Visual Resonance" (25 April–29 September 2025)
- Huis Marseille, Museum for photography, Amsterdam, "Adam Fuss, Retrospective 1986/2010" (2011)
- Modern Art Museum of Fort Worth, "FOCUS: Adam Fuss" (5 March–23 April 2006)
- Museum of Fine Arts, Boston, "Adam Fuss" (25 September 2002–12 January 2003)
- Fotomuseum Winterthur, Switzerland, "Adam Fuss" (1999)
- Akron Art Museum, Akron Ohio (1992)
- National Gallery of Victoria, Melbourne, Australia (1992)

== Gallery exhibitions ==
- Xavier Hufkens (Brussels, Belgium), "Adam Fuss" (28 February – 5 April 2008)
- Fraenkel Gallery (San Francisco, California, USA), Adam Fuss (3 November – 30 December 2005)
- Timothy Taylor Gallery (London, England), "Adam Fuss" (9 September – 14 October 2005)
- Cheim & Read Gallery (New York, New York, USA), "Adam Fuss" (16 October – 15 November 2003)

== Collections ==
- Akron Art Museum, Akron, OH.
- Albright-Knox, NY
- Australian National Gallery, Canberra, Australia.
- Cincinnati Art Museum, Cincinnati, OH
- Denver Art Museum, Denver, CO.
- Fisher Landau Center, Long Island City, NY.
- George Eastman House, Rochester, NY.
- The Henry Art Gallery, Seattle, WA
- Israel Museum, Israel.
- Los Angeles County Museum of Art, Los Angeles, CA.
- The Metropolitan Museum of Art, New York, NY.
- Museum of Modern Art, New York, NY.
- National Gallery of Victoria, Melbourne, Australia.
- Toledo Museum of Art, Toledo, OH.
- U.S. Trust Company, New York, NY.
- Victoria and Albert Museum, London, England.
- Vienna Moderner Kunst Museum
- Whitney Museum of American Art, NY.
- Middlebury College Museum of Art, Middlebury, VT

== Awards ==
- Sixteenth Annual ICP Infinity Award for Art, 2000
- Awarded Honorary Fellowship of the Royal Photographic Society in 2016.
