= Floris Michael Neusüss =

German photographer (1937–2020)

- Born: 3 March 1937; Remscheid, Germany
- Died: 1 April 2020 (aged 83); Cassel, Germany
- Occupation: Photographer

Floris Michael Neusüss (3 March 1937 – 1 April 2020) was a German photographer.

== Biography ==
Floris Neusüss was born in Lennep, Germany, on 3 March 1937. He began as a painter the took up photography which he studied at the Wuppertal School of Arts and Crafts in North Rhine-Westphalia, before continuing at the Bavarian State Institute of Photography in Munich. He trained alongside photographer Heinz Hajek-Halke at the Berlin University of the Arts. In 1957, he began making photograms and photomontages.

In the autumn of 1960, he began to expose whole human bodies on black and white paper. From 1962 onwards, he predominantly used black and white reversal paper for these "body pictures". This not only emphasises their shadowiness, but for Neusüss - coming from painting - "the form-giving element in my pictures has primarily been black." Fritz Gruber gave the works, on which significantly naked female bodies leave their imprints, the significant name "Nudogramme". The Cologne photo collector also showed these nudograms in 1963 as part of a special exhibition at the photokina in Cologne, which attracted a great deal of attention. From 1964, Neusüss has also experimented with chemical painting on photograms. By the end of the 1970s, Neusüss brought the photogram out of the darkroom and out of the studio to the objects recording motifs not with a camera but rather a folder with photo paper, on which he exposed subjects such as plants or windows. He also continued to explore the body-photograms bringing them into a performative context as for instance 1977 in Arles or experimenting with silhouette like life-size portraits, including several using his friend and frequent collaborator, Robert Heinecken as the subject. In his later years, in collaboration with his wife Renate Heyne, he was particularly concerned with museums and collections, where they worked mainly in the dark of the night to capture large-format objects on photographic paper, such as those of Greek statues from the Glypothek in Munich.

Neusüss always strictly separated the photogram as a contact image from camera photography. According to this interpretation, the original object touched the image;

It is true that the subject resting on the photo-sensitive paper presents its reverse side to be recorded, the side that is in shadow, the shadow cast by the object itself. This intimate physical connection inscribes into the paper, and this, if you are open to it, is the real fascination of photograms: the tension between the hidden and the revealed.

In 1979, at the Centro de Arte Contemporânea in Porto (followed by Coimbra and Lisbon) Neusüss coordinated A Fotografia como Arte bringing together work by European artists (Bernd and Hilla Becher, Arnulf Rainer, Jürgen Klauke, Jochen Gerz, Nils Udo, Christian Boltanski) and Portuguese artists (Fernando Calhau, Julião Sarmento, Helena Almeida, Alberto Carneiro and Ângelo de Sousa).

In 1982 and 1985, Neusüss exhibited works which displayed the maladies of pollution, which aroused strong reactions. In the early 1980s, he exhibited Artificial Landscapes, chemical works of abstract art that resembles small buildings on a horizon.

In 1984, he began designing Nachtbilder ('nocturnal pictures'), photographs taken outside at night and produced by placing photo paper emulsion side down into a woodland or garden at night during a thunderstorm during which it might be tumbled about by the wind and exposed by lightning.

At Lacock Abbey in Wiltshire, England, in 1978 Neusüss had realized one of his first outdoor photograms, recording on large size black and white paper at night the window that formed the subject of William Henry Fox Talbot's first photographic negative, made there in 1835. 2010 Neusüss reenacted his early project recording the same window in colour on Ilfochrome paper. The work was presented in Shadow Catchers, 13 October 2010 - 20 February 2011 at the Victoria and Albert Museum, London. Curator of the show Martin Barnes described Neusüss' work as "a poetic dialogue between presence and absence".

== Teaching ==
From 1966, Neusüss taught as a freelance lecturer at the Kassel Art College and in 1972 was appointed professor of photography there. In 1972, he founded the college gallery Fotoforum Kassel for conceptual photography, which became one of the most eminente centers for photography organizing exhibitions and symposia on conceptual and experimental photography. Since 2005, the collection of the Fotoforum Kassel is part of the photographic collection of the Stiftung Moritzburg in Halle. Amongst his students were Kazuo Katase, Gerhard Lang, Hermann Stamm, Thomas Bachler, Sabine Große, Jutta Winkelmann, Gisela Getty, Wolfgang Pietrzok, and Brigitte Maria Mayer. In 2002, aged 65, he retired. Neusüss was a full member of the Mitglied im Deutschen Künstlerbund (German Association of Artists).

== Legacy ==
Through this work, Nesüss established himself as one of the leaders in experimental photography. His teaching as Professor of Experimental Photography at the University of Kassel was influential. In the 1980s, Neusüss also experimented with colour photograms and collages which through his teaching at Kassel had an effect on the style of several generations of photographers.

Neusüss died in 2020 and his photograms are currently held in the collections of the Art Institute of Chicago; the Museum of Modern Art in New York; the Getty Museum in Los Angeles; the Los Angeles County Museum of Art; the Victoria and Albert Museum, London; and the Museum of Fine Arts, Houston. There are several monographs published on his work and he produced several textbooks and collections of photograms.

== Exhibitions ==
- 2010: Shadow Catchers, Victoria and Albert Museum, London.
- 2018: Ferner Zeiten Schatten-Fotogramme. Schadow-Haus des Bundestages, Berlin
- 2017: Intent and Gesture: Photograms - Color (1966–2007), solo exhibition, Von Lintel Gallery, Los Angeles
- 2016: Leibniz' Lager, Einzelausstellung, Zentrum für Kunst und Medientechnologie, Karlsruhe
- 2015: Dreams + Photograms, solo exhibition, Von Lintel Gallery, Los Angeles
- 2014: What is a photograph?, January 31-May 4, 2014, International Center of Photography, New York.
- 2012/13: Ancient and Modern, 8 Nov 2012 – 12 Jan 2013, Atlas Gallery, London
- 2012: Traumbilder – Bilderträumer, Frühe Kamerafotografien und Fotoaktionen von Floris Neusüss, Münchner Stadtmuseum
- 2010: Solo Exhibition, 15 Oct – 27 Nov 2010, Atlas Gallery, London
- 2009: Early Works, 13 Jun – 2 Aug 2009, Fondazione Sozzani, Milan
- 2007: Retrospective, 20 Apr – 9 Jun 2007, Atlas Gallery, London
- 2007: Floris Neusüss Photograms, 27 Apr – 2 Jun 2007, Atlas Gallery, London
- 2007: Kameralose Fotografie; Fotogramme, 31 Mar – 4 May 2007, Kleinschmidt, Wiesbaden
- 2007: Fotogramme, 3 Feb – 24 Mar 2007, Villa Grisebach Gallery, Germany
- 2005: Vor Troja – Antikenfotogramme, Winckelmann-Museum, Stendal
- 2004: Helden, Herrscher und Passanten, 5 Jun – 8 Aug 2004, Georg Kolbe Museum, Berlin
- 1997: Participation in the 45th annual exhibition of the German Association of Artists in Wismar and Rostock
- 1983: Fotogramme–die lichtreichen Schatten, Fotomuseum des Münchner Stadtmuseums, Kassel.
- 1977: Kunstverein Kassel, Kassel

=== Posthumous ===
- 2021: Floris Neusüss : 50 Years, September 11 – October 27, Von Lintel Gallery, Bergamot Station, Santa Monica, California

== Collections ==
- Art Institute of Chicago
- Houston Museum of Fine Arts
- Getty Museum
- Los Angeles County Museum of Art
- Victoria and Albert Museum, London

== Publications ==
- Neusüss, Floris Michael; Diener, Christian (1977), Floris Neusüss Fotografie : 1957-1977, F. M. Neusüss
- Neusüss, Floris Michael; Sobieszek, Robert A., 1943-; Immisch, T. O; Staatliche Galerie Moritzburg, Landeskunstmuseum Sachsen-Anhalt (2001), Körperbilder : fotogramme der sechziger jahre, Staatliche Galerie Moritzburg, ISBN 978-3-86105-092-6
- Heyne, Renate; Neusüss, Floris Michael, (photographer.); Weibel, Peter, (editor.); Zentrum für Kunst und Medientechnologie Karlsruhe (host institution.) (2017), Leibniz' Lager : eine Sammlungswelt in Fotogrammen = Leibniz' storehouse : photograms of a collected world, Berlin Hatje Cantz, ISBN 978-3-7757-4230-6
- Neusüss, Floris Michael (1979), Fotografie als Kunst, Kunst als Fotografie : das Medium Fotografie in d. bildenden Kunst in Europa ab 1968 = Photography as art, art as photography (Erstveröff ed.), DuMont
- Neusüss, Floris Michael; Cardorff, Peter (2000), ULOs wunderbar : [Hangout für Kunst und Philosophie], Parerga, ISBN 978-3-930450-56-5
- Neusüss, Floris Michael (1982), Photo recycling Photo, Bermuda-Dreieck für Fotografie
- Cardorff, Peter; Neusüss, Floris Michael (1998), Erotischer Realismus : kleines Manual (1. Aufl ed.), Parerga, ISBN 978-3-930450-32-9
- Heinecken, Robert; Neusüss, Floris Michael; Pastor, Suzanne E; Fotoforum (Kassel, Germany) (1983), Robert Heinecken, fast easy and fun, Fotoforum Kassel
- Neusüss, Floris Michael; Barrow, Thomas F; Hagen, Charles; Denver Art Museum (1994), Experimental vision : the evolution of the photogram since 1919, Roberts Rinehart Publishers in association with the Denver Art Museum, ISBN 978-1-879373-73-0
- Moholy-Nagy, László; Moholy-Nagy, László, 1895-1946, (artist.); Heyne, Renate, (editor.); Moholy-Nagy, Hattula, (editor.); Molderings, Herbert, (writer of added text.); Neusüss, Floris Michael, (editor.) (2009), Moholy-Nagy : the photograms : catalogue raisonné, Hatje Cantz, ISBN 978-3-7757-2341-1
- Neusüss, Floris Michael, & Schweizerische Stiftung für die Photographie Kunsthaus Zürich;. (1990). Anwesenheit bei Abwesenheit: Fotogramme und die Kunst des 20. Jahrhunderts.
- Neusüss, Floris Michael (1983). Fotogramme–die lichtreichen Schatten, Ausst. Kat. Fotomuseum des Münchner Stadtmuseums, Kassel.
