= Andrzej Pawłowski =

Andrzej Pawłowski (20 July 1925, in Wadowice – 16 February 1986, in Kraków) was a Polish avant-garde painter, sculptor, photographer, and experimental filmmaker. He was also a well-respected innovator in industrial design and an architect of exhibition arrangements. While a professor of the Academy of Fine Arts in Kraków, he was among the co-creators of the Industrial Forms Department. Pawlowski's experimental work looked at the relationship between visual form and kinetic movement.

== Work ==
His 1957 experimental film Kineformy (Cineforms) consisted of projecting moving abstract models onto a screen using a special image-distorting lens. Pawlowski devised a light machine with two crank-like handles to move the models and the lenses. The light, passing through the lenses, distorted the forms, resulting in a series of very complex images – wispy smoke, diaphanous curtains, passing ghosts and then suddenly solid organic forms. This light performance was then filmed. It became an international success and today is one of the leading examples of avant-garde film and video in Poland.

Pawłowski's later work included Naturally Shaped Forms (1963), reliefs produced by the pressure of metal tape on the reverse of the picture, Mannequins (1968), sculptures produced from a liquid medium setting in sacks tied with a cord into casts shaped by the force of inertia of the medium, Stimulators of Inadequate Impressions (1967), sculptures enclosed in containers whose shapes may only be determined by touch, and Conversations with an Idiot (1977–1980), an attempt to design the 'ideal' chair with the aid of a computer.

Pawłowski was furthermore a member of the Association of Polish Visual Artists and the Association of Polish Artistic Photographers, as well as a participant of the International Council of Societies of Industrial Design (ICSID).
