= Mikhail Tarkhanov (painter) =

Mikhail Mikhailovich Tarkhanov
- Михаи́л Миха́йлович Тарха́нов
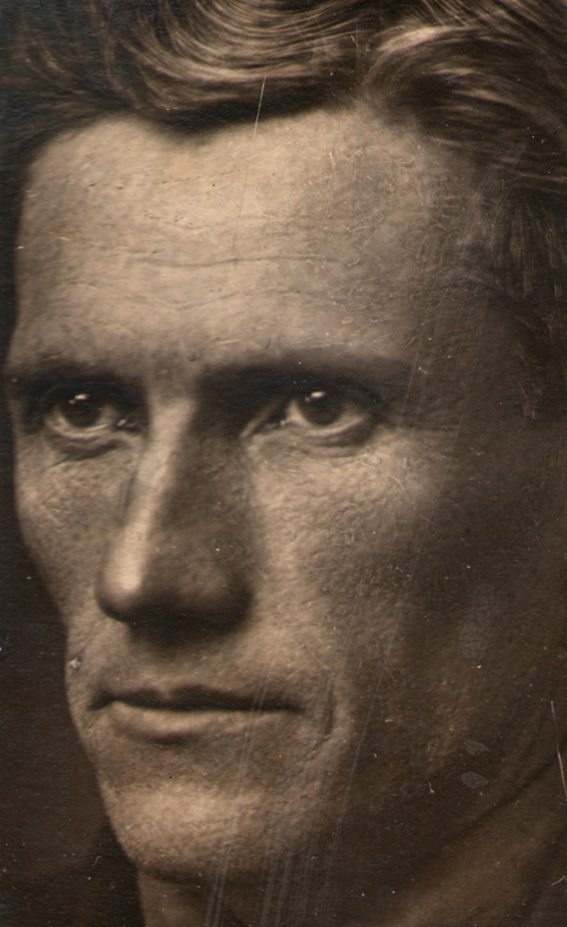
- Portrait of Mikhail Tarkhanov, coll. part.
- Born: November 4, 1888; Zinkiv, Poltava Governorate, Russian Empire
- Died: March 12, 1962 (aged 74); Moscow, Soviet Union
- Education: Stroganov Moscow State University of Arts and Industry
- Occupation: Painter

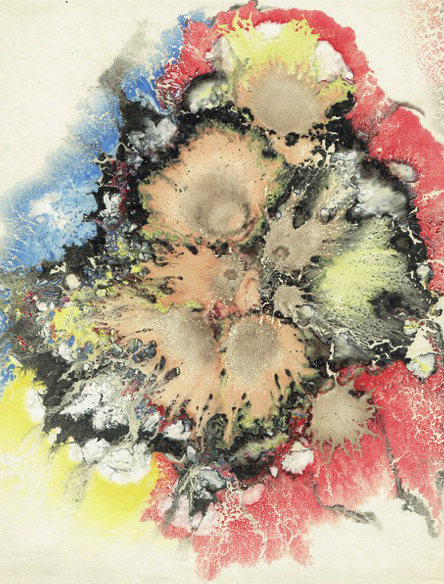
MIKHAIL MIKHAILOVICH TARKHANOV - untitled - 1934.

Mikhail Mikhailovich Tarkhanov (4 November 1888, in Zenkov, Poltava Governorate, Imperial Russia, modern Ukraine – 12 March 1962, in Moscow, USSR) was a Russian and Soviet painter known for his "Picturesque Textured Improvisations", abstract water based textured compositions. He studied at the Stroganov Moscow State University of Arts and Industry where he graduated in 1915. After being called to the Russian army in 1916 and 1919 as an artist-topographer and draftsman, he entered the VKhUTEMAS, the Russian state art and technical school, in 1921. His teachers were Vasili Kandinsky, Vladimir Favorsky and Nikolay Kupreyanov. He worked for many Soviet institutions as he pursued his abstract work, which were restricted in the communist Russia.

== Personal exhibitions ==
1929 : Moscow, VKhUTEIN (former VKhUTEMAS).

1930 : Nizhny Novgorod, Nizhny Novgorod Polygraphic Trust.

1931 : Moscow, Rare Book Museum.

1973 : Moscow, Stroganoff Arts Institute.

2016: 'Abstract Compositions', New York, Shapiro's Auctions. Curated by Masha Stroganova & Anya Litvinova.

== Known Museum Collections ==
- The Getty Center, Los Angeles, U.S.A.
- San Diego Museum of Art, San Diego, U.S.A.
- State Tretyakov Gallery, Moscow.
- State Russian Museum, Leningrad - St. Petersburg.
- State (Pushkin) Museum of Fine Arts, Moscow.
- Kherson Museum of Fine Arts, Kherson, Ukraine.
- Kirgiz State Museum of Fine Arts, Frunze, Kirgizia.
- Semipalatinsk Museum of Fine Arts, Kazakhstan.
- Tula Museum of Fine Arts, Tula, Russia.

== Bibliography ==
- Jean-Louis Cohen, David Woodruff, Ljiljana Grubisic, Russian Modernism, Los Angeles, Getty Publications, 1997.
- Eleventh State Exhibition (Applied Art Union), Narkompros, Moscow, 1919, pages 61–62, 66–67.
- Four Arts. Exhibition Catalogue, GAKhN, Moscow, 1925.
- Catalogue of the Exhibition of Association of Artists Four Arts, Glavnauka, Moscow, 1926, page 13.
- Catalogue of the Exhibition of Engravings and Drawings organized by ARMU, ARMU, Kiev, 1928, page 24.
- Catalogue of the Exhibition Association of Artists Four Arts, Glavnauka, Moscow, 1929, page 13.
- Catalogue du SALON INTERNATIONAL DU LIVRE D’ART (préface D’André Suares), Petit Palais, Paris, 1931, page 172.
- Moscow Artists of 1920s-1930s, Sovetsky Khudozhnik, Moscow, 1991, pages 108–109, 212.
- Khan-Magomedov, S. VHUTEMAS (Two Volumes), Éditions du Regard, Paris, 1991.
