= Latin grammar =

Grammar of the Latin language

Latin is a heavily inflected language with largely free word order. Nouns are inflected for number and case; pronouns and adjectives (including participles) are inflected for number, case, and gender; and verbs are inflected for person, number, tense, aspect, voice, and mood. The inflections are often changes in the ending of a word, but can be more complicated, especially with verbs.

Thus verbs can take any of over 100 different endings to express different meanings, for example regō "I rule", regor "I am ruled", regere "to rule", regī "to be ruled". Most verbal forms consist of a single word, but some tenses are formed from part of the verb sum "I am" added to a participle; for example, ductus sum "I was led" or ductūrus est "he is going to lead".

Nouns belong to one of three grammatical genders (masculine, feminine, and neuter). The gender of the noun is shown by the last syllables of the adjectives, numbers and pronouns that refer to it: e.g. hic vir "this man", haec fēmina "this woman", hoc bellum "this war". There are also two numbers: singular (mulier "woman") and plural (mulierēs "women").

As well as having gender and number, nouns, adjectives, and pronouns have different endings according to their function in the sentence, for example, rēx "the king" (subject), but rēgem "the king" (object). These different endings are called "cases". Most nouns have five cases: nominative (subject or complement), accusative (object), genitive ("of"), dative ("to" or "for"), and ablative ("with", "in", "by" or "from"). Nouns for people (potential addressees) have the vocative (used for addressing someone). Some nouns for places have a seventh case, the locative; this is mostly found with the names of towns and cities, e.g. Rōmae "in Rome". Adjectives must agree with their nouns in gender, number, and case.

When a noun or pronoun is used with a preposition, the noun must be in either the accusative or the ablative case, depending on the preposition. Thus ad "to, near" is always followed by an accusative case, but ex "from, out of" is always followed by an ablative. The preposition in is followed by the ablative when it means "in, on", but by the accusative when it means "into, onto".

There is no definite or indefinite article in Latin, so that rēx can mean "king", "a king", or "the king" according to context.

Latin word order tends to be subject–object–verb; however, other word orders are common. Different word orders are used to express different shades of emphasis. (See Latin word order.)

An adjective can come either before or after a noun, e.g. vir bonus or bonus vir "a good man", although some kinds of adjectives, such as adjectives of nationality (vir Rōmānus "a Roman man") usually follow the noun.

Latin is a pro-drop language; that is, pronouns in the subject are usually omitted except for emphasis, so for example amās by itself means "you love" without the need to add the pronoun tū "you". Latin also exhibits verb framing in which the path of motion is encoded into the verb rather than shown by a separate word or phrase. For example, the Latin verb exit (a compound of ex and it) means "he/she/it goes out".

In this article a line over a vowel used on ā, ē, ī, ō, ū and ȳ is called a macron and it indicates that it is long.

== Nouns ==
=== Number ===
Most Latin nouns have two numbers, singular and plural: rēx "king", rēgēs "kings". A few nouns, called plūrālia tantum ("plural only"), although plural in form, have a singular meaning, e.g. castra "a camp", litterae "a letter", nūptiae "a wedding".

=== Gender ===
Nouns are divided into three genders, known as masculine, feminine, and neuter. The difference is shown in the pronouns and adjectives that refer to them, for example:

- ipse rēx "the king himself" (masculine)
- ipsa rēgīna "the queen herself" (feminine)
- ipsum bellum "the war itself" (neuter)

To a certain extent, the genders follow the meanings of the words (for example, winds are masculine, tree-names feminine):

- Masculine nouns include all those referring to males, such as dominus "master", puer "boy", deus "god", but also some inanimate objects such as hortus "garden", exercitus "army", mōs "custom". Words in the 2nd declension ending in -us or -er are usually masculine.
- Feminine nouns include all those referring to females, such as puella "girl", mulier "woman", dea "goddess", but also inanimate or abstract nouns such as arbor "tree", urbs "city", hūmānitās "kindness", nātiō "nation". Words in the 1st declension like puella ending in -a are usually feminine, with a few exceptions such as poēta "poet". Also feminine are 3rd declension nouns ending in -tās and -tiō.
- Neuter nouns (apart from scortum "a prostitute (of either gender)") all refer to things, such as nōmen "name", corpus "body", bellum "war", venēnum "poison".

Neuter nouns differ from masculine and feminine in two ways: (1) the plural nominative and accusative forms end in -a, e.g. bella "wars", corpora "bodies"; (2) the subject (nominative) and object (accusative) cases are identical.

=== Case ===
Nouns in Latin have a series of different forms, called cases of the noun, which have different functions or meanings. For example, the word for "king" is rēx when it is the subject of a verb, but rēgem when it is the object:

- rēx videt "the king sees" (nominative case)
- rēgem videt "(he) sees the king" (accusative case)

Further cases mean "of" (genitive case), "to/for" (dative case), and "with" (ablative case).

Nouns for people have a separate form used for addressing a person (vocative case). In most nouns for women and girls, the vocative is the same as the nominative.

Some nouns, such as the names of cities and small islands, and the word domus "home", have a seventh case called the locative, for example Rōmae "in Rome" or domī "at home"; however, most nouns do not have this case.

The genitive, dative and ablative cases are called the "oblique" cases.

The order in which the cases are given in grammar books differs in different countries. In Britain and countries influenced by Britain, the order nominative, vocative, accusative is used as in the table below. In the United States, in grammars such as Gildersleeve and Lodge's Latin Grammar (1895), the traditional order is used, with the genitive case in the second place and ablative last. In the popularly used Wheelock's Latin (1956, 7th edition 2011) and Allen and Greenough's New Latin Grammar (1903), however, the vocative is placed at the end.

The following table shows the endings of a typical noun of the 3rd declension. If Gildersleeve and Lodge's order is preferred, click on the symbol "GL" in the seventh column in the table below; for Wheelock's order click on "Wh":

Name of case	Use	sing.	meaning	plur.	meaning	Br	GL	Wh
Nominative	Subject	rēx	a king, the king	rēgēs	kings, the kings	1	1	1
Vocative	Addressing	rēx	o king!	rēgēs	o kings!	2	5	6
Accusative	Object, goal	rēgem	a king, the king (object)	rēgēs	kings, the kings (object)	3	4	4
Genitive	of	rēgis	of the king, of a king	rēgum	of kings, of the kings	4	2	2
Dative	to, for	rēgī	to the king	rēgibus	to kings, to the kings	5	3	3
Ablative	with, by, from, in	rēge	with the king	rēgibus	with the kings	6	6	5

Sometimes the same endings, e.g. -ēs and -ibus, are used for more than one case. Since the function of a word in Latin is shown by ending rather than word order, in theory rēgēs dūcunt could mean either "the kings lead" or "they lead the kings". In practice, however, such ambiguities are rare.

=== Declensions ===
==== 1st and 2nd declensions ====
Latin nouns are divided into different groups according to the patterns of their case endings. These different groups are known as declensions. Nouns with -a in the nominative singular, like puella "girl", are known as "1st declension nouns", and so on.

The following table shows the declension of puella "girl" (1st declension), dominus "lord, master" (2nd declension masculine), and bellum "war" (2nd declension neuter):

Case	feminine		masculine		neuter		Br	GL	Wh
Case	1 sg.	1 pl.	2 sg.	2 pl.	2n sg.	2n pl.	Br	GL	Wh
Nominative	puella	puellae	dominus	dominī	bellum	bella	1	1	1
Vocative	puella	puellae	domine	dominī	bellum	bella	2	5	6
Accusative	puellam	puellās	dominum	dominōs	bellum	bella	3	4	4
Genitive	puellae	puellārum	dominī	dominōrum	bellī	bellōrum	4	2	2
Dative	puellae	puellīs	dominō	dominīs	bellō	bellīs	5	3	3
Ablative	puellā	puellīs	dominō	dominīs	bellō	bellīs	6	6	5

1st declension nouns are usually feminine, except for a few referring to men, such as agricola "farmer" or poēta "poet". The nouns fīlia "daughter" and dea "goddess" have dative and ablative plural fīliābus, deābus. The locative case ends in -ae, pl. -īs, e.g. Rōmae "in Rome", Athēnīs "in Athens".

2nd declension nouns in -us are usually masculine, but those referring to trees (e.g. pīnus "pine tree") and some place names (e.g. Aegyptus "Egypt") are feminine. A few 2nd declension nouns, such as vir "man" and puer "boy", lack endings in the nominative and vocative singular. In the 2nd declension, the genitive plural in some words is optionally -um, especially in poetry: deum or deōrum "of the gods", virum or virōrum "of men".

Neuter nouns such as bellum "war" have -a in the nominative plural. In neuter nouns, the vocative and accusative are always the same as the nominative; the genitive, dative, and ablative are the same as the masculine. Most 2nd declension neuter nouns end in -um but vīrus "poison" and vulgus "crowd" end in -us.

==== 3rd declension ====
Third declension nouns have various patterns of declension. Some decline like the following: mīles "soldier", urbs "city", corpus "body":

Case	masculine		feminine		neuter		Br	GL	Wh
Case	3 sg.	3 pl.	3 sg.	3 pl.	3n sg.	3n pl.	Br	GL	Wh
Nominative	mīles	mīlitēs	urbs	urbēs	corpus	corpora	1	1	1
Vocative	mīles	mīlitēs	urbs	urbēs	corpus	corpora	2	5	6
Accusative	mīlitem	mīlitēs	urbem	urbēs/-īs	corpus	corpora	3	4	4
Genitive	mīlitis	mīlitum	urbis	urbium	corporis	corporum	4	2	2
Dative	mīlitī	mīlitibus	urbī	urbibus	corporī	corporibus	5	3	3
Ablative	mīlite	mīlitibus	urbe	urbibus	corpore	corporibus	6	6	5

There are some variations, however. A few, such as vīs, vim, vī "force", have accusative singular -im and ablative singular -ī; some, like ignis "fire", optionally have -ī instead of -e in the ablative singular. The genitive plural in some nouns is -um, in others -ium. (For details, see Latin declension.) 3rd declension nouns can be of any gender.

It is not usually possible to guess the genitive of a noun from the nominative: dux "leader" has genitive ducis but rēx "king" has rēgis; pater "father" has genitive patris but iter "journey" has itineris. For this reason the genitive is always given in dictionaries, and can be used to deduce the remaining cases.

==== 4th and 5th declensions ====
4th and 5th declension nouns are less common. They decline like the following (manus "hand", genū "knee", diēs "day"):

Case	feminine		neuter				Br	GL	Wh
Case	4 sg.	4 pl.	4 sg.	4 pl.	5 sg.	5 pl.	Br	GL	Wh
Nominative	manus	manūs	genū	genua	diēs	diēs	1	1	1
Vocative	manus	manūs	genū	genua	diēs	diēs	2	5	6
Accusative	manum	manūs	genū	genua	diēm	diēs	3	4	4
Genitive	manūs	manuum	genūs	genuum	diēī	diērum	4	2	2
Dative	manuī	manibus	genuī, genū	genibus	diēī	diēbus	5	3	3
Ablative	manū	manibus	genū	genibus	diē	diēbus	6	6	5

4th declension nouns are usually masculine, but a few, such as manus "hand" and anus "old lady", are feminine. There are only four 4th declension neuter nouns.

5th declension nouns (except for diēs (m) "day") are usually feminine. rēs "thing" is similar to diēs except for a short e in the genitive and dative singular reī.

==== Other nouns ====
In addition to the above there are some irregularly declined nouns, mostly borrowed from Greek, such as the name Aenēās "Aeneas" (1st declension masculine).

The vocative is nearly always the same as the nominative, except in 1st and 2nd declension masculine singular words, such as Aenēā! "Aeneas!" and domine! "master!/lord!". Some words, such as deus "god", have no separate vocative, however.

=== Use of cases ===
==== Nominative ====
The nominative case is used for the subject of an active or a passive verb:

rēx respondit = the king replied
rēx occīsus est = the king was killed

It is also used for the complement of a copula verb such as est "he is" or factus est "he became":

rēx erat Aenēās nōbīs = our king was Aeneas / Aeneas was our king
rēx factus est = he was made king / he became king

==== Vocative ====
The vocative case is used when addressing someone:

iubēsne mē, Rōmule Rēx, foedus ferīre? = do you order me, King Romulus, to strike a treaty?

==== Accusative ====
The accusative case is used for the object of a sentence:

rēgem interfēcērunt = they killed the king

It is also used as the subject of an infinitival clause dependent on a verb of speaking or the like:

rēgem interfectum esse crēdēbant = they believed that the king had been killed

It can be the complement of another word which is itself accusative:

Tullum populus rēgem creāvit = the people made Tullus their king

It can also be used with a place name to refer to the destination:

Rōmam profectus est = he set out for Rome

The accusative is also used after various prepositions (especially those that imply motion towards):

senātus ad rēgem lēgātōs mīsit = the Senate sent ambassadors to the king
cōnsul in urbem rediit = the consul returned to the city

Another use of the accusative is to give a length of time or distance:

rēgnāvit annōs quīnque = he reigned for five years
quīnque pedēs longus = five foot tall

==== Genitive ====
A genitive noun can represent possession or relationship:

rēgis fīlia = the king's daughter, daughter of the king

A genitive noun can stand for the object of mental processes such as misereor "I pity" and oblīvīscor "I forget":

numquam oblīvīscar noctis illīus = I will never forget that night

A genitive noun attached to a verbal noun can stand for the object of the implied verb (called an "objective genitive"):

maximī virī dēsiderium = my longing for the great man

A genitive noun can stand for the subject of the implied verb (called a "subjective" genitive):

Caesaris adventus = Caesar's arrival

A frequent type of genitive is the partitive genitive, expressing the quantity of something:

satis temporis = enough time

==== Dative ====
The dative case means "to" or "for". It is frequently used with verbs of saying or giving:

rēgī nūntiātum est = it was announced to the king
pecūniam rēgī crēdidit = he entrusted the money to the king

It can also be used with certain adjectives:

cārissimus erat rēgī = he was very dear to the king

It is also used with certain verbs such as pāreō "I obey" or persuādeō "I persuade":

pāruit rēgī = he was obedient to (i.e. obeyed) the king

There are also various idiomatic uses, such as the dative of possession:

quid est tibī nōmen? = what's your name?

==== Ablative ====
The ablative case can mean "with", especially when the noun it refers to is a thing rather than a person:

gladiō sē transfīgit = he stabbed himself with a sword

Often a phrase consisting of a noun plus participle in the ablative can express time or circumstance. This is known as an "ablative absolute":

rēgibus exāctīs = with the kings driven out, i.e. after the kings were driven out

It is also frequently used with prepositions, especially those meaning "from", "with", "in", or "by":

ūnus ē rēgibus = one from (i.e. one of) the kings
cum rēgibus = with the kings
ā rēgibus = by the kings, from the kings
prō rēge = for/on behalf of the king

Another use is in expressions of time and place (except those that give the length of time or distance):

eō tempore = at that time
hōc locō = at this place
paucīs diēbus = in a few days

The ablative can also mean "from", especially with place names:

Rōmā profectus est = he set out from Rome
locō ille mōtus est = he was dislodged from his position

==== Locative ====
The locative is a rare case used only with names of cities, small islands, and one or two other words such as domus "home". It means "at" or "in":

cōnsul alter Rōmae mānsit = one of the two consuls remained in Rome
multōs annōs nostrae domī vīxit = he lived at our house for many years

== Adjectives ==
=== Declension of adjectives ===
Adjectives, like nouns, have different endings for the different cases, singular and plural. They also differ as to gender, having different forms for masculine, feminine, and neuter. (But masculine and neuter are identical in the genitive, dative, and ablative cases.)

Many adjectives belong to the 1st and 2nd declensions, declining in the same way as the nouns puella, dominus, bellum. An example is the adjective bonus "good" shown below:

Case	m. sg.	f. sg.	n. sg.	m. pl	f. pl.	n. pl.	Br	GL	Wh
Nominative	bonus	bona	bonum	bonī	bonae	bona	1	1	1
Vocative	bone	bona	bonum	bonī	bonae	bona	2	5	6
Accusative	bonum	bonam	bonum	bonōs	bonās	bona	3	4	4
Genitive	bonī	bonae	bonī	bonōrum	bonārum	bonōrum	4	2	2
Dative	bonō	bonae	bonō	bonīs	bonīs	bonīs	5	3	3
Ablative	bonō	bonā	bonō	bonīs	bonīs	bonīs	6	6	5

Other adjectives belong to the 3rd declension, in which case the masculine and feminine are usually identical. Most 3rd declension adjectives are i-stems, and have ablative singular -ī and genitive plural -ium. An example is ingēns "huge" shown below:

Case	m/f. sg.	n. sg.	m/f. pl	n. pl.	Br	GL	Wh
Nominative	ingēns	ingēns	ingentēs	ingentia	1	1	1
Vocative	ingēns	ingēns	ingentēs	ingentia	2	5	6
Accusative	ingentem	ingēns	ingentēs/-īs	ingentia	3	4	4
Genitive	ingentis	ingentis	ingentium	ingentium	4	2	2
Dative	ingentī	ingentī	ingentibus	ingentibus	5	3	3
Ablative	ingentī	ingentī	ingentibus	ingentibus	6	6	5

In a very few 3rd declension adjectives such as ācer, ācris, ācre "sharp, keen", the feminine is different from the masculine, but only in the nominative and vocative singular.

A few adjectives (especially comparative adjectives) decline as consonant stems, and have ablative singular -e and genitive plural -um. An example is melior "better":

Case	m/f. sg.	n. sg.	m/f. pl	n. pl.	Br	GL	Wh
Nominative	melior	melius	meliōrēs	meliōra	1	1	1
Vocative	melior	melius	meliōrēs	meliōra	2	5	6
Accusative	meliōrem	melius	meliōrēs	meliōra	3	4	4
Genitive	meliōris	meliōris	meliōrum	meliōrum	4	2	2
Dative	meliōrī	meliōrī	meliōribus	meliōribus	5	3	3
Ablative	meliōre	meliōre	meliōribus	meliōribus	6	6	5

Participles such as dūcēns "leading" usually have -e in the ablative singular, but -ium in the genitive plural.

There are no adjectives in the 4th or 5th declensions.

The adjectives sōlus "only" and tōtus "the whole of" decline like pronouns, with genitive singular -īus and dative singular -ī:

tōtīus Graeciae = of the whole of Greece (genitive case)
tibī sōlī = to you alone (dative case)

=== Agreement of adjectives ===
Any adjective that describes or refers to a noun must be in the same case as the noun, as well as the same number and gender. Thus in the phrase below, where rēx is in the vocative singular case, bonus must be in the vocative singular also:

ō bone rēx = o good king

=== Comparative and superlative adjectives ===
Adjectives have positive, comparative and superlative forms. Superlative adjectives are declined according to the first and second declension, but comparative adjectives are third declension.

When used in sentences, a comparative adjective can be used in several ways:

- Absolutely (with the meaning "rather" or "more than usual")
- With quam (Latin for "than")
- With an ablative meaning "than"
- With the genitive

Examples:

- Cornēlia est fortis puella: Cornelia is a brave girl.

The comparative adjective can be used absolutely (i.e. without any overt comparison) or with the comparison made explicit:

- Cornēlia est fortior puella: Cornelia is a rather brave girl.
- Cornēlia est fortior puella quam Flāvia: Cornelia is a braver girl than Flavia. (Here quam is used, Flavia is in the nominative to match Cornelia)
- Cornēlia est fortior Flāviā: Cornelia is braver than Flavia. (Here Flavia is in the ablative.)
- Cornēlia est fortior puellārum: Cornelia is the braver of the girls

Superlative adjectives are most frequently used absolutely, but they can also be used with the genitive omnium "of all":

- Cornēlia est puella fortissima: Cornelia is a very brave girl
- Cornēlia est puella omnium fortissima: Cornelia is the bravest girl of all.

Some comparative and superlative adjectives
Positive	Comparative	Superlative
longus, -a, -um long, tall	longior, -ius longer, taller	longissimus, -a, -um very long, longest
brevis, -e short	brevior, -ius shorter	brevissimus, -a, -um very short, shortest
pulcher, -chra, -chrum beautiful	pulchrior, -ius more beautiful	pulcherrimus, -a, -um very beautiful, most beautiful
bonus, -a, -um good	melior, -ius better	optimus, -a, -um very good, best
facilis, -is, -e easy	facilior, -ius easier	facillimus, -a, -um very easy, easiest
magnus, -a, -um great	maior, -ius greater	maximus, -a, -um very great, greatest
malus, -a, -um bad	peior, -ius worse	pessimus, -a, -um very bad, worst
multus, -a, -um much	plūs (+ genitive) more	plūrimus, -a, -um very much, most
multī, -ae, -a many	plūres, plūra more	plūrimī, -ae, -a very many, most
parvus, -a, -um small	minor smaller	minimus, -a, -um very small, smallest
superus, -a, -um situated above	superior, -ius higher, previous	suprēmus, -a, -um / summus, -a, -um highest, last
(prae) before	prior, prius earlier	prīmus, -a, -um first

Detailed information and declension tables can be found at Latin declension.

== Pronouns ==
Pronouns are of two kinds, personal pronouns and 3rd person pronouns. Personal pronouns decline as follows.

Case	I	you sg.	himself/ herself	we	you pl.	themselves	Br	Am
Nominative	ego	tū	–	nōs	vōs	–	1	1
Accusative	mē	tē	sē / sēsē	nōs	vōs	sē / sēsē	3	4
Genitive	meī	tuī	suī	nostrum/-trī	vestrum/-trī	suī	4	2
Dative	mihī	tibī	sibī	nōbīs	vōbīs	sibī	5	3
Ablative	mē	tē	sē / sēsē	nōbīs	vōbīs	sē / sēsē	6	6

mē, tē, nōs, vōs can also be used reflexively ("I see myself" etc.).

Nōs is frequently used in classical Latin for "I", but vōs is never used in a singular sense.

The genitive nostrum is used partitively (ūnusquisque nostrum "each one of us"), nostrī objectively (memor nostrī "remembering us, mindful of us").

3rd person pronouns are those such as hic "this" and ipse "(he) himself". The 3rd person pronouns can also be used adjectivally (except that quid "what?" when adjectival becomes quod). The declension of these pronouns tends to be irregular. They generally have -īus in the genitive singular, and -ī in the dative singular. In a few pronouns (illud "that", istud "that (of yours)", id "it, that", quod "which", quid "anything; what?", aliud "another", aliquid "something") the neuter singular ends in -d.

The declension of ille "that" is as follows:

Case	m. sg.	f. sg.	n. sg.	m. pl	f. pl.	n. pl.	Br	Am
Nominative	ille	illa	illud	illī	illae	illa	1	1
Accusative	illum	illam	illud	illōs	illās	illa	3	4
Genitive	illīus (illius)	illīus	illīus	illōrum	illārum	illōrum	4	2
Dative	illī	illī	illī	illīs	illīs	illīs	5	3
Ablative	illō	illā	illō	illīs	illīs	illīs	6	6

Ipse "he himself" is very similar, except that the neuter singular ipsum ends in -m instead of -d.

Other very common 3rd person pronouns are hic, haec, hoc "this" and is, ea, id "he, she, it; that". Like other 3rd person pronouns, these can be used either independently (is "he") or adjectivally (is homō "that man"):

Case	m. sg.	f. sg.	n. sg.	m. pl	f. pl.	n. pl.	Br	Am
Nominative	hic	haec	hoc	hī	hae	haec	1	1
Accusative	hunc	hanc	hoc	hōs	hās	haec	3	4
Genitive	huius	huius	huius	hōrum	hārum	hōrum	4	2
Dative	huic	huic	huic	hīs	hīs	hīs	5	3
Ablative	hōc	hāc	hōc	hīs	hīs	hīs	6	6

Before a vowel, hic and hoc are pronounced as if spelled hicc and hocc. Huius is pronounced as if spelled huiius with a long first syllable.

Case	m. sg.	f. sg.	n. sg.	m. pl	f. pl.	n. pl.	Br	Am
Nominative	is	ea	id	iī	eae	ea	1	1
Accusative	eum	eam	id	eōs	eās	ea	3	4
Genitive	eius	eius	eius	eōrum	eārum	eōrum	4	2
Dative	eī	eī	eī	eīs/iīs	eīs/iīs	eīs/iīs	5	3
Ablative	eō	eā	eō	eīs/iīs	eīs/iīs	eīs/iīs	6	6

Also very common is the relative pronoun quī, quae, quod "who, which". The interrogative quis? quid? "who? what?" and indefinite quis, qua, quid "anyone, anything" are similar apart from the nominative singular:

Case	m. sg.	f. sg.	n. sg.	m. pl	f. pl.	n. pl.	Br	Am
Nominative	quī	quae	quod	quī	quae	quae	1	1
Accusative	quem	quam	quod	quōs	quās	quae	3	4
Genitive	cuius	cuius	cuius	quōrum	quārum	quōrum	4	2
Dative	cui	cui	cui	quibus	quibus	quibus	5	3
Ablative	quō	quā	quō	quibus	quibus	quibus	6	6

Like adjectives, pronouns must agree in gender, case, and number with the nouns they refer to, as in the following, where hic is masculine agreeing with amor, but haec is feminine, agreeing with patria:

hic amor, haec patria est = this is my love, this my country

There is no indefinite article or definite article (the, a, an). Sometimes the weak determiner is, ea, id (English "that, this") can serve for the definite article:

Persuāsīt populō ut eā pecūniā classis aedificārētur
"He persuaded the people that a fleet should be built with the money (with that money)"

== Adverbs ==
Adverbs modify verbs, adjectives and other adverbs by indicating time, place or manner. Latin adverbs are indeclinable and invariable. Like adjectives, adverbs have positive, comparative and superlative forms.

The positive form of an adverb can often be formed from an adjective by appending the suffix -ē (2nd declension adjectives) or -(t)er (3rd declension adjectives). Thus the adjective clārus, -a, -um, which means "bright", can be contrasted to the adverb clārē, which means "brightly". The adverbial ending -(i)ter is used to form adverbs from 3rd declension adjectives, for example celer "quick", celeriter "quickly". Other endings such as -ō, -e, -tim are also found.

The comparative form of an adverb is the same as the neuter nominative singular form of a comparative adjective and usually ends in -ius. Instead of the adjective clārior, which means "brighter", the adverb is clārius, which means "more brightly".

The superlative adverb has the same base as the superlative adjective and always ends in a long -ē. Instead of the adjective clārissimus, which mean "very bright" or "brightest", the adverb is clārissimē, which means "very brightly" or "most brightly".

Some comparative and superlative adverbs
Positive	Comparative	Superlative
dignē worthily	dignius more worthily	dignissimē very worthily, most worthily
fortiter bravely	fortius more bravely	fortissimē very bravely, most bravely
facile easily	facilius more easily	facillimē very easily, most easily
bene well	melius better	optimē very well, best
male badly	peius worse	pessimē very badly, worst
magnopere greatly	magis more	maximē very greatly, most, especially
paulum a little	minus less	minimē very little, least
multum much	plūs more	plūrimum very much, most
diū for a long time	diūtius for a longer time, any longer	diūtissimē for a very long time
saepe often	saepius more often	saepissimē very often, most often

== Prepositions ==
=== Prepositions ===
A prepositional phrase in Latin is made up of a preposition followed by a noun phrase in the accusative or ablative case. The preposition determines the case that is used, with some prepositions allowing different cases depending on the meaning. For example, Latin in takes the accusative case when it indicates motion (English "into") and the ablative case when it indicates position (English "on" or "inside"):

in urbem = "into the city" (accusative)
in urbe = "in the city" (ablative)

Most prepositions take one case only. For example, all those that mean "from", "by", or "with" take the ablative:

ex urbe = "out of the city"
ab urbe = "(away) from the city"
cum Caesare = "with Caesar"

Other prepositions take only the accusative:

extrā urbem = "outside the city"
ad urbem = "to/near the city"
per urbem = "through(out) the city"
circum urbem = "around the city"

=== Postpositions ===
In addition, there are a few postpositions. tenus "as far as" usually follows an ablative, sometimes a genitive plural case:

Taurō tenus "as far as Taurus"
Cūmārum tenus "as far as Cumae"

versus "towards" is usually combined with ad or in:

ad Alpēs versus "towards the Alps"

causā "for the sake of" follows a genitive:

honōris causā "for the sake of (doing) honour"

The word cum "with" is usually a preposition, but with the personal pronouns mē, tē, sē, nōbīs, vōbīs "me, you sg., him/herself/themselves, us, you pl." it follows the pronoun and is joined to it in writing:

cum eō "with him"
mēcum "with me"

Both quōcum and cum quō "with whom" are found.

Prepositions and postpositions in Latin (extensive list)
Preposition	Case	Meaning, notes
ā, ab, abs	+ abl	from; down from; at, in, on, (of time) after, since (source of action or event), by, of
absque	+ abl	without (archaic, cf. sine and praeter)
ad	+ acc	towards, to, at
adversus, adversum	+ acc	towards, against (also an adverb)
ante	+ acc	before (also an adverb)
apud	+ acc	at, by, near, among; chez; before, in the presence of, in the writings of, in view of
causā	+ gen	for the sake of (normally after its noun; simply the abl. of causa)
circum	+ acc	about, around, near;
circā	+ acc	around, near, about; regarding, concerning
circiter	+ acc	(of place and time) near, close, round about
cis	+ acc	on, to this, the near side of, short of; before
citrā	+ acc	on this side of (also an adverb)
clam	+ acc & + abl	without the knowledge of, unknown to (also an adverb). Its use with the ablative is rare. Clanculum is a variant of this preposition.
contrā	+ acc	against, opposite to, contrary to, otherwise, in return to, back
cōram	+ abl	in person, face to face; publicly, openly
cum	+ abl	with
dē	+ abl	from, concerning, about; down from, out of
ergā	+ acc	against, opposite; towards, with regard to (sometimes placed after the noun or pronoun)
ex, ē	+ abl	out of, from
extrā	+ acc	outside of, beyond
fīne, fīnī	+ gen	up to (ablative of fīnis). Can also be a postposition.
grātiā	+ gen	for the sake of. Usually placed after the noun.
in	+ acc	into, onto, to; about, respecting; according to; against
in	+ abl	in, among, at, on (space); during, at (time)
īnfrā	+ acc	below
inter	+ acc	between, among; during, while
intrā	+ acc	within, inside; during; in less than
iūxtā	+ acc	nearly; near, close to, just as. Can also follow the noun.
ob	+ acc	in the direction of, to, towards; on account of, according to, because of, due to, for (the purpose of); against; facing
palam	+ abl	without concealment, openly, publicly, undisguisedly, plainly, unambiguously
penes	+ acc	Under one's government or command; In one's disposal or custody; At, with, about, concerning
per	+ acc	through, by means of; during
pōne	+ acc	behind; in the rear of
post	+ acc	behind (of space); afterwards, after (of time)
prae	+ abl	before, in front of, because of
praeter	+ acc	besides, except; beyond; more than
prō	+ abl	for, on behalf of; before; in front, instead of; about; according to; as, like; as befitting
procul	+ abl	far, at a distance
prope	+ acc	near, nearby, (figuratively) towards, about (in time)
propter	+ acc	near, close to, hard by; because of, on account of, for; (rare) through, by means of
secundum	+ acc	next, along, according to
simul	+ abl	with
sine	+ abl	without
sub	+ acc	under, up to, up under, close to (of a motion); until, before, up to, about
sub	+ abl	(to) under, (to) beneath; near to, up to, towards; about, around (time)
subter	+ acc	under, underneath; following (in order or rank); in the reign of
subter	+ abl	underneath, (figuratively) below inferior
super	+ acc	above, over, beyond; during
super	+ abl	concerning, regarding, about
suprā	+ acc	above, over, more than, before
tenus	+ gen & + abl	(with genitive and ablative) right up to, as far as, just as far as; (with ablative, of a process) up to (a given stage of); (with genitive and ablative, of limitation) to the maximum extent of, within. Used as a postposition.
trāns	+ acc	across, beyond
versus, versum	+ acc	towards (postposition, usually combined with ad or in)
ultrā	+ acc	beyond

== Numerals and numbers ==
The first three numbers have masculine, feminine and neuter forms fully declined as follows:

Declension	1 m	f	n	2 m	f	n	3 mf	n	Br	GL	Wh
Nominative	ūnus	ūna	ūnum	duo	duae	duo	trēs	tria	1	1	1
Vocative	ūne	ūna	ūnum	duo	duae	duo	trēs	tria	2	5	6
Accusative	ūnum	ūnam	ūnum	duōs/duo	duās	duo	trēs/trīs	tria	3	4	4
Genitive	ūnīus/-ius	ūnīus	ūnīus	duōrum	duārum	duōrum	trium	trium	4	2	2
Dative	ūnī	ūnī	ūnī	duōbus	duābus	duōbus	tribus	tribus	5	3	3
Ablative	ūnō	ūnā	ūnō	duōbus	duābus	duōbus	tribus	tribus	6	6	5

ūnus (one) can also be used in the plural, with plural-only nouns, e.g. ūna castra "one camp", ūnae litterae "one letter". For larger numbers plural-only nouns use special numerals: bīna castra "two camps", trīna castra "three camps". (See Latin numerals.)

The numbers quattuor (four) through decem (ten) are not declined:

quattuor (4)
quīnque (5)
sex (6)
septem (7)
octō (8)
novem (9)
decem (10)

The "tens" numbers are also not declined:

vīgintī (20)
trīgintā (30)
quadrāgintā (40)
quīnquāgintā (50)
sexāgintā (60)
septuāgintā (70)
octōgintā (80)
nōnāgintā (90)

The numbers 11 to 17 are formed by affixation of the corresponding digit to the base -decim, hence ūndecim, duodecim, tredecim, quattuordecim, quīndecim, sēdecim, septendecim. The numbers 18 and 19 are formed by subtracting 2 and 1, respectively, from 20: duodēvīgintī and ūndēvīgintī. For the numbers 21 to 27, the digits either follow or are added to 20 by the conjunction et: vīgintī ūnus or ūnus et vīgintī, vīgintī duo or duo et vīgintī etc. The numbers 28 and 29 are again formed by subtraction: duodētrīgintā and ūndētrīgintā. Each group of ten numerals through 100 follows the patterns of the 20s but 98 is nōnāgintā octō and 99 is nōnāgintā novem rather than *duodēcentum and *ūndēcentum respectively.

Compounds ending in 1, 2 and 3 are the only ones to decline:

I saw 20 blackbirds = vīgintī merulās vīdī
I saw 22 blackbirds = vīgintī duās merulās vīdī (where duās changes to agree with merulās)

The "hundreds" numbers are the following:

centum (indeclinable)
ducentī, -ae, -a (200)
trecentī, -ae, -a (300)
quadringentī, -ae, -a (400)
quīngentī, -ae, -a (500)
sēscentī, -ae, -a (600)
septingentī, -ae, -a (700)
octingentī, -ae, -a (800)
nōngentī, -ae, -a (900)

However, 1000 is mille, an indeclinable adjective, but multiples such as duo mīlia (2000) have mīlia as a neuter plural substantive followed by a partitive genitive:

I saw a thousand lions = mīlle leōnēs vīdī
I saw three thousand lions = tria mīlia leōnum vīdī

Ordinal numbers are all adjectives with regular first- and second-declension endings. Most are built off of the stems of cardinal numbers (for example, trīcēsimus, -a, -um (30th) from trīgintā (30), sēscentēsimus, -a, -um nōnus, -a, -um (609th) for sēscentī novem (609). However, "first" is prīmus, -a, -um, and "second" is secundus, -a, -um (literally "following" the first; sequi means "to follow").

== Verbs ==
=== Persons of the verb ===
Each tense has endings corresponding to three persons in the singular, known as 1st person singular ("I"), 2nd person singular ("you sg."), 3rd person singular ("he, she, it"), and three in the plural, known as 1st person plural ("we"), 2nd person plural ("you pl."), and 3rd person plural ("they"). Unlike Ancient Greek, there is no dual number in the Latin verb.

1st sg. 2nd sg. 3rd sg.	I you sg. he, she, it	amō amās amat	I love you sg. love he, she, it loves
1st pl. 2nd pl. 3rd pl.	we you pl. they	amāmus amātis amant	we love you pl. love they love

Unlike in Spanish, French, and other Romance languages, there are no respectful 2nd person forms in Latin grammar: the 2nd person singular is used even when addressing a person of high status. However, the 1st person plural is often used to mean "I".

=== Gender ===
Most verbs do not show grammatical gender: the same ending is used whether the subject is "he", "she", or "it". However, when a verb is made periphrastically out of a participle and part of the verb sum "I am", the participle shows gender, for example:

- missus est "he was sent"
- missa est "she was sent"

Impersonal verbs, such as nūntiātum est "it was reported", are neuter singular.

=== Voice ===
Latin verbs have two voices, active (e.g. dūcō "I lead") and passive (e.g. dūcor "I am led").

Active	(doing)	dūcō	I lead, I am leading
Passive	(being done)	dūcor	I am led, I am being led

In addition there are a few verbs (e.g. sequor "I follow") which have the endings of passive verbs but with an active meaning, a relic of the older mediopassive voice. These verbs are known as deponent verbs. Intransitive verbs such as sum "I am" usually have no passive voice. However, some intransitive verbs can be used in the passive voice, but only when impersonal, e.g. pugnātum est "(a battle) was fought", ventum est "they came" (literally, "it was come").

=== Mood ===
Latin verbs have three moods: indicative, subjunctive, and imperative:

Indicative	(actual)	dūcit	he leads, he is leading
Subjunctive	(potential)	dūcat	he may/would/should lead
Imperative	(command)	dūc!	lead!

Ordinary statements such as dūcō "I lead" or vēnit "he came" are said to be in the indicative mood. The subjunctive mood (e.g. dūcat "he may lead, he would lead" or dūxisset "he would have led") is used for potential or hypothetical statements, wishes, and also in reported speech and certain types of subordinate clause. The imperative mood (e.g. dūc "lead!") is a command.

In addition Latin verbs have a number of non-finite forms, such as the infinitive and various participles.

=== Regular and irregular verbs ===
Most Latin verbs are regular and follow one of the five patterns below. These are referred to as the 1st, 2nd, 3rd, and 4th conjugation, according to whether the infinitive ends in -āre, -ēre, -ere or -īre. (Verbs like capiō are regarded as variations of the 3rd conjugation, with some forms like those of the 4th conjugation.)

Other verbs like sum "I am" are irregular and have their own pattern.

REGULAR		I love	I see	I lead	I capture	I hear
Present tense active	I you sg. he, she, it we you pl. they	amō amās amat amāmus amātis amant	videō vidēs videt vidēmus vidētis vident	dūcō dūcis dūcit dūcimus dūcitis ducunt	capiō capis capit capimus capitis capiunt	audiō audīs audit audīmus audītis audiunt
Infinitive	to	amāre (1)	vidēre (2)	dūcere (3)	capere (3)	audīre (4)
		I am loved	I am seen	I am led	I am captured	I am heard
Present tense passive	I you sg. he, she, it we you pl. they	amor amāris amātur amāmur amāminī amantur	videor vidēris vidētur vidēmur vidēminī videntur	dūcor dūceris dūcitur dūcimur dūciminī ducuntur	capior caperis capitur capimur capiminī capiuntur	audior audīris audītur audīmur audīminī audiuntur
Infinitive	to	amārī (1)	vidērī (2)	dūcī (3)	capī (3)	audīrī (4)
IRREGULAR		I am	I am able	I bring	I want	I go
Present tense	I you sg. he, she, it we you pl. they	sum es est sumus estis sunt	possum potes potest possumus potestis possunt	ferō fers fert ferimus fertis ferunt	volō vīs vult volumus vultis volunt	eō īs it īmus ītis eunt
Infinitive	to	esse	posse	ferre	velle	īre

Compound verbs such as adsum "I am present", nōlō "I don't want", redeō "I go back", etc., usually have the same endings as the simple verbs from which they are made.

=== Tenses ===
==== A 3rd conjugation example ====
Latin verbs have six basic tenses in the indicative mood. Three of these are based on the present stem (e.g. dūc-) and three on the perfect stem (e.g. dūx-).

In addition, there are four tenses in the subjunctive mood, and two in the imperative.

Further tenses can be made periphrastically by combining participles with the verbs sum "I am" or habeō "I have", for example ductūrus eram "I was going to lead" or ductum habeō "I have led".

The following table gives the various forms of a 3rd conjugation verb dūcō. As with other verbs, three different stems are needed to make the various tenses: dūc- in the three non-perfect tenses, dūx- in the three perfect tenses, and duct- in the perfect participle and supine. The perfect and supine stems for any particular verb cannot always be predicted and usually have to be looked up in a dictionary.

INDICATIVE	Active		Passive	
Present	dūcō dūcis dūcit dūcimus dūcitis dūcunt	I lead, I am leading you lead he/she/it leads we lead you pl. lead they lead	dūcor dūceris dūcitur dūcimur dūciminī dūcuntur	I am led, I am being led you are led he/she/it is led we are led you pl. are led they are led
Future	dūcam dūcēs dūcet dūcēmus dūcētis dūcent	I will lead, I will be leading you will lead he/she/it will lead we will lead you pl. will lead they will lead	dūcar dūcēris/-e dūcētur dūcēmur dūcēminī dūcentur	I will be led, I will be being led you will be led he/she/it will be led we will be led you pl. will be led they will be led
Imperfect	dūcēbam dūcēbās dūcēbat dūcēbāmus dūcēbātis dūcēbant	I was leading, used to lead you were leading he/she/it was leading we were leading you pl. were leading they were leading	dūcēbar dūcēbāris/-re dūcēbātur dūcēbāmur dūcēbāminī dūcēbantur	I was being led, I used to be led you were being led he/she/it was being led we were being led you pl. were being led they were being led
Perfect	dūxī dūxistī dūxit dūximus dūxistis dūxērunt/-ēre	I led, I have led you led he/she/it led we led you pl. led they led	ductus sum ductus es ductus est ductī sumus ductī estis ductī sunt	I was led, I have been led you were led he was led we were led you pl. were led they were led
Future Perfect	dūxerō dūxerīs/-is dūxerit dūxerīmus dūxerītis dūxerint	I will have led you will have led he/she/it will have led we will have led you pl. will have led they will have led	ductus erō ductus eris ductus erit ductī erimus ductī eritis ductī erunt	I will have been led you will have been led he will have been led we will have been led you pl. will have been led they will have been led
Pluperfect	dūxeram dūxerās dūxerat dūxerāmus dūxerātis dūxerant	I had led you had led he/she/it had led we had led you pl. had led they had led	ductus eram ductus erās ductus erat ductī erāmus ductī erātis ductī erant	I had been led you had been led he had been led we had been led you pl. had been led they had been led
SUBJUNCTIVE
Present	dūcam dūcās dūcat dūcāmus dūcātis dūcant	I may lead, I would lead you would lead he/she/it would lead we would lead you pl. would lead they would lead	dūcar dūcāris dūcātur dūcāmur dūcāminī dūcantur	I may be led, I would be led you would be led he/she/it would be led we would be led you pl. would be led they would be led
Imperfect	dūcerem dūcerēs dūceret dūcerēmus dūcerētis dūcerent	I might lead, should lead you might lead he/she/it might lead we might lead you pl. might lead they might lead	dūcerer dūcerēris dūcerētur dūcerēmur dūcerēminī dūcerentur	I might be led you might be led he/she/it might be led we might be led you pl. might be led they might be led
Perfect	dūxerim dūxerīs dūxerit dūxerīmus dūxerītis dūxerint	I would have led, I led you would have led he/she/it would have led we would have led you pl. would lead they would have led	ductus sim ductus sīs ductus sit ductī sīmus ductī sītis ductī sint	I would have been led, I was led you were led he was led we were led you pl. were led they were led
Pluperfect	dūxissem dūxissēs dūxisset dūxissēmus dūxissētis dūxissent	I would have led, I had led you would have led he/she/it would have led we would have led you pl. would have led they would have led	ductus essem ductus essēs ductus esset ductī essēmus ductī essētis ductī essent	I would have been led you would have been led he would have been led we would have been led you pl. would have been led they would have been led
IMPERATIVE
Present	dūc! dūcite!	lead! (sg.) lead! (pl.)	(dūcere!) (dūciminī!)	be led! be led! (pl.)
Future	dūcitō! dūcitōte!	lead! (sg.) lead! (pl.)		
3rd person	dūcitō dūcuntō	he must lead they must lead		
INFINITIVES
Present	dūcere	to lead	dūcī	to be led
Future	ductūrus esse	to be going to lead	ductum īrī	to be going to be led
Perfect	dūxisse	to have led	ductus esse	to have been led
Periphrastic perfect	ductūrus fuisse	to have been going to lead		
PARTICIPLES
Present	dūcēns dūcentēs	(while) leading (sg.) (while) leading (pl.)		
Future	ductūrus/a/um	going to lead		
Perfect			ductus/a/um	having been led
GERUNDIVE			dūcendus/a/um	(needing) to be led
GERUND	ad dūcendum dūcendī dūcendō	with a view to leading of leading by leading		
SUPINE	ductum (it) (facile) ductū	(he goes) in order to lead (easy) to lead		

A distinction between perfective aspect (I did) and imperfective aspect (I was doing) is found only in the past in Latin. In the present or future, the same tenses have both aspectual meanings.

Unlike in Ancient Greek or modern English, there is no distinction between perfect (I have done) and simple past (I did). The same tense, known in Latin grammar as the perfect tense, has both meanings.

The passive imperative is almost never used except in deponent verbs, e.g. sequere mē! "follow me!"

==== Variations ====
The different conjugations differ in some tenses. For example, in the future tense:

- 1st and 2nd conjugation verbs and eō have the endings -bō, -bis, -bit, -bimus, -bitis, -bunt (e.g. amābō "I will love", vidēbō "I will see", ībō "I will go").
- 3rd and 4th conjugation verbs and volō and ferō have the endings -am, -ēs, -et, -ēmus, -ētis, -ent (dūcam "I will lead", audiam "I will hear").
- Sum and possum have the endings erō, eris, erit, erimus, eritis, erunt (erō "I will be", poterō "I will be able")

In the imperfect indicative:

- Most verbs have the endings -bam, -bās, -bat, -bāmus, -bātis, -bant (e.g. amābam, vidēbam, dūcēbam, capiēbam, ferēbam, volēbam)
- Sum and possum have eram, erās, erat, erāmus, erātis, erant (e.g. poteram "I was able")

They also differ in the present subjunctive:

- 1st conjugation verbs have the endings -em, -ēs, -et, -ēmus, -ētis, -ent (e.g. amem "I may love")
- 2nd, 3rd, 4th conjugations have -am, -ās, -at, -āmus, -ātis, -ant (videam "I may see", dūcam "I may lead", audiam "I may hear", eam "I may go")
- Sum, possum, volō have -im, -īs, -it, -īmus, -ītis, -int (sim "I may be", possim "I may be able", velim "I may wish")

The imperfect subjunctive of every verb looks like the infinitive + an ending:

- Regular: amārem, vidērem, dūcerem, caperem, audīrem
- Irregular: essem, possem, ferrem, vellem, īrem

In the various perfect tenses, all verbs have regular endings. However, the stem to which the perfect endings are added cannot always be guessed, and so is given in dictionaries.

== Word order ==
Latin allows a very flexible word order because of its inflectional syntax. Ordinary prose tended to follow the pattern of subject, direct object, indirect object, adverbial words or phrases, verb (with the proviso that when noun and verb make a compound, as impetum facio "I attack / make an attack" the noun is generally placed close to the verb). Any extra but subordinate verb, such as an infinitive, is placed before the main verb. Adjectives and participles usually directly follow nouns unless they are adjectives of beauty, size, quantity, goodness, or truth, in which case they usually precede the noun being modified. However, departures from these rules are frequent.

Relative clauses are commonly placed after the antecedent that the relative pronoun describes. Since grammatical function in a sentence is based not on word order but on inflection, the usual word order in Latin was often abandoned with no detriment to understanding but with various changes in emphasis.

While these patterns of word order were the most frequent in Classical Latin prose, they were frequently varied. The strongest surviving evidence suggests that the word order of colloquial Latin was mostly subject-object-verb. That can be found in some very conservative Romance languages, such as Sardinian and Sicilian in which the verb is still often placed at the end of the sentence (see Vulgar Latin). On the other hand, subject-verb-object word order was probably also common in ancient Latin conversation, as it is prominent in the Romance languages, which evolved from Latin.

In poetry, however, word order was often changed for the sake of the meter for which vowel quantity (short vowels vs. long vowels and diphthongs) and consonant clusters, not rhyme and word stress, governed the patterns. One must bear in mind that poets in the Roman world wrote primarily for the ear, not the eye; many premiered their work in recitation for an audience. Hence, variations in word order served a rhetorical as well as a metrical purpose; they certainly did not prevent understanding.

In Virgil's Eclogues, for example, he writes, Omnia vincit amor, et nōs cēdāmus amōrī!: "Love conquers all, let us too yield to love!". The words omnia (all), amor (love) and amōrī (to love) are thrown into relief by their unusual position in their respective phrases.

The ending of the common Roman name Mārcus is different in each of the following pairs of examples because of its grammatical usage in each pair. The ordering in the second sentence of each pair would be correct in Latin and clearly understood, whereas in English it is awkward, at best, and meaningless, at worst:

Mārcus ferit Cornēliam: Marcus hits Cornelia. (subject–verb–object)
Mārcus Cornēliam ferit: Marcus Cornelia hits. (subject–object–verb)
Cornēlia dedit Mārcō dōnum: Cornelia gave Marcus a gift. (subject–verb–indirect object–direct object)
Cornēlia Mārcō dōnum dedit: Cornelia (to) Marcus a gift gave. (subject–indirect object–direct object–verb)

== See also ==
- Declension of Greek nouns in Latin
- Latin syntax
- Latin mnemonics
- Latin word order
- Latin numerals

== Bibliography ==
- Allen, Joseph Henry; Greenough, James Bradstreet; Kittredge, George Lyman; Howard, Albert Andrew; D'Ooge, Benjamin Leonard (1903). Allen and Greenough's New Latin Grammar for Schools and Colleges. Boston and London: Ginn & Company.
- Álvares, Manuel (1860). Institutio Grammatica. Roma: Leonardus Oliverius.
- Bennett, Charles Edwin (1895). Latin Grammar. Boston: Allyn and Bacon.
- Devine, Andrew M.; Stephens, Laurence D. (2006). Latin Word Order: Structured Meaning and Information. Oxford, New York: Oxford University Press. ISBN 9780195181685.
- Gildersleeve, Basil Lanneau; Lodge, Gonzalez (1903) [1895]. Gildersleeve's Latin Grammar (3d ed., rev. and enl. ed.). London: Macmillan & Co.
- Kennedy, Benjamin Hall (1962) [1871]. Kennedy's Revised Latin Primer. London: Addison-Wesley Longman Ltd.
- Kühner, Raphael; Stegmann, Carl (1912–1914) [1879]. Ausführliche Grammatik der lateinischen Sprache. Darmstadt: Wissenschaftliche Buchgesellschaft.
- Leumann, Manu; Hofmann, J.B.; Szantyr, Anton (1977) [1926]. Lateinische Grammatik. München: C.H. Beck.
- Lewis, Charlton T.; Short, Charles (1879). "A Latin Dictionary. Founded on Andrews' edition of Freund's Latin dictionary". Perseus Digital Library Project. Oxford: Clarendon Press.
