= Latin declension =

Part of Latin grammar

Latin declension is the set of patterns in the Latin language for how nouns and certain other parts of speech (including pronouns and adjectives) change form according to their grammatical case, number and gender. Words that change form in this manner are said to be declined.

Declension is normally marked by suffixation: attaching different endings to the declined word. For nouns, Latin grammar instruction typically distinguishes five main patterns of endings. The patterns are numbered from first to fifth and subdivided by grammatical gender. The term "declension" can refer either to the overarching phenomenon, or to one of these specific five patterns. For example, nouns that have a genitive singular form that ends in -ae are said to belong to "the first declension".

Adjectives are of two kinds: those like bonus, bona, bonum 'good' use first-declension endings for the feminine, and second-declension for masculine and neuter. Other adjectives such as celer, celeris, celere belong to the third declension. There are no fourth- or fifth-declension adjectives.

Pronouns are also of two kinds, the personal pronouns such as ego 'I' and tū 'you (sg.)', which have their own irregular declension, and the third-person pronouns such as hic 'this' and ille 'that' which can generally be used either as pronouns or adjectivally. These latter decline in a similar way to the first and second noun declensions, but there are differences; for example the genitive singular ends in -īus or -ius instead of -ī or -ae and the dative singular ends in -ī.

The cardinal numbers ūnus 'one', duo 'two', and trēs 'three' also have their own declensions (ūnus has genitive -īus and dative -ī like a pronoun). However, numeral adjectives such as bīnī 'a pair, two each' decline like ordinary adjectives.

Declension is a specific type of inflection, and is distinguished from other ways that words change form in the Latin language, such as the conjugation of verbs.

== Grammatical cases ==
A complete Latin noun declension includes up to seven grammatical cases: nominative, vocative, accusative, genitive, dative, ablative and locative. The locative is limited to a few nouns: generally names of cities, small islands and a few other words.

=== Syncretism ===
Different cases commonly share the same form (called syncretism). The patterns of shared endings vary depending on a noun's grammatical number, gender, and declension class. The following are the most notable patterns of syncretism:

==== Number-based ====
- The nominative and vocative are always identical in the plural.
- The dative, ablative, and locative are always identical in the plural.

==== Gender-based ====
- For neuter nouns, the nominative, vocative, and accusative cases are always identical. The nominative, vocative, and accusative plural almost always ends in -a. (Both of these features are inherited from Proto-Indo-European.)

==== Declension-based ====
- The vocative and nominative singular are identical for all nouns except non-neuter second-declension nouns ending in -us (for example, amīcus, vocative amīce) and a few learned borrowings of Greek origin (for example, first-declension Aenēās, vocative Aenēā).
- The genitive singular is the same as the nominative plural for first-, second-, and fourth-declension non-neuter Latin nouns.
- The dative singular is the same as the genitive singular for first- and fifth-declension Latin nouns (excluding borrowings).
- The dative singular is the same as the ablative singular for all second-declension nouns, some third-declension nouns (full i-stems, including most third-declension adjectives), and some fourth-declension nouns (regularly for neuters, e.g. cornŭ "horn", dative and ablative cornū, but usually not for non-neuter nouns, e.g. manŭs, ūs, f. "hand", dative manuī and ablative manū).
- The locative singular is identical to the genitive in the 1st and 2nd declensions; to the dative or ablative in the 3rd declension; to the ablative in the 5th declension.
- The non-neuter nominative and accusative plural are identical for all nouns of the 4th declension (in -ūs) and 5th declension (in -ēs), and for many nouns of the 3rd declension (in -ēs; but a distinct accusative plural in -īs can be used in Classical Latin for some i-stem nouns).

=== Order of cases ===
The Roman grammarian Aelius Donatus (4th century AD), whose work was used as standard throughout the Middle Ages, placed the cases in this order:

casus sunt sex: nominativus, genetivus, dativus, accusativus, vocativus, ablativus.
"there are six cases: nominative, genitive, dative, accusative, vocative and ablative."

This order was based on the order used by earlier Greek grammarians, with the addition of the ablative, which does not exist in Greek. The names of the cases also were mostly translated from the Greek terms, such as accusativus from the Greek αἰτῐᾱτῐκή.

This traditional order was formerly used in England, such as in The School and University Eton Latin Grammar (1861). That order is still followed in most other European countries. Gildersleeve and Lodge's Latin Grammar (1895) also follow this order. More recent Latin grammars published in the United States, such as Allen and Greenough's New Latin Grammar (1903) and Wheelock's Latin (first published in 1956) follow this order except they list the vocative last.

However, in Britain and countries influenced by Britain other than the United States, the Latin cases are usually given in the following order: nominative, vocative, accusative, genitive, dative, ablative. This order was introduced in Benjamin Hall Kennedy's Latin Primer (1866), with the aim of making tables of declensions easier to recite and memorise (the first three and the last two cases having identical forms in several declensions). It is also used in France and Belgium. In Rosa (1962), a song in French by the Belgian singer Jacques Brel, Brel sings the declension of "rosa" as rosa, rosa, rosam, following the British order of cases.

=== History of cases ===
Old Latin had essentially two patterns of endings. One pattern was shared by the first and second declensions, which derived from the Proto-Indo-European thematic declension. The other pattern was used by the third, fourth and fifth declensions, and derived from the athematic PIE declension.

== Nouns ==
Regularly inflected Latin nouns have two principal parts: the nominative singular and the genitive singular. Each declension can be unequivocally identified by the ending of the genitive singular (-ae, -i, -is, -ūs, -ei). This ending can be removed from the genitive singular form to find the noun's oblique stem, which is shared between all inflected forms aside from the nominative singular. (The nominative singular sometimes, but not always has a distinct stem.)

Latin declension is commonly taught in terms of attaching different sets of vowel-initial endings to the oblique stem. For example, the first-declension noun vacca 'cow' has the genitive singular vaccae, with the oblique stem vacc-. Its ablative singular can be formed by combining vacc- with the ending -ā, forming vaccā. The second-declension noun taurus 'bull' has the genitive singular taurī, with the oblique stem taur-. Its ablative singular can be formed by combining taur- with the ending -ō, forming taurō.

There are five declensions (in other words, five such sets of endings) for Latin nouns:

=== First declension (a stems) ===
Nouns of this declension usually end in -a in the nominative singular and are mostly feminine, e.g. via, viae f. ('road') and aqua, aquae f. ('water'). There is a small class of masculine exceptions generally referring to occupations, e.g. poēta, poētae m. ('poet'), agricola, agricolae m. ('farmer'), auriga, aurigae m. ('auriga, charioteer'), pīrāta, pīrātae m. ('pirate') and nauta, nautae m. ('sailor'). Neuter nouns do not occur in the first declension, with the sole exception of pascha, paschae n. or f. ('Easter'), which is sometimes neuter and sometimes feminine.

The predominant letter in the ending forms of this declension is a. The nominative singular form consists of the stem and the ending -a, and the genitive singular form is the stem plus -ae.

First declension paradigm
	Singular	Plural
Nominative & Vocative	-a	-ae
Accusative	-am	-ās
Genitive	-ae	-ārum
Dative	-ae	-īs
Ablative	-ā	-īs
Locative	Gen.	Dat.

	mēnsa, mēnsae table (f.)		poēta, poētae poet (m.)	
	Singular	Plural	Singular	Plural
Nominative & Vocative	mēnsa	mēnsae	poēta	poētae
Accusative	mēnsam	mēnsās	poētam	poētās
Genitive	mēnsae (Note: The archaic genitive ending in -ai (as in aquai) occurs occasionally in Virgil and Lucretius, to evoke the style of older writers. Plus, the archaic genitive ending in -ās is used in expressions like pater familiās (also possible in conjunction with māter, fīlius and fīlia).)	mēnsārum	poētae	poētārum
Dative	mēnsae	mēnsīs	poētae	poētīs
Ablative	mēnsā	mēnsīs	poētā	poētīs

The locative endings for the first declension are -ae (singular) and -īs (plural), similar to the genitive singular and ablative plural, as in mīlitiae 'in war' and Athēnīs 'at Athens'.

==== First declension Greek nouns ====
The first declension also includes three types of Greek loanwords, derived from Ancient Greek's alpha declension. They are declined irregularly in the singular, but sometimes treated as native Latin nouns, e.g. nominative athlēta ('athlete') instead of the original athlētēs. Archaic (Homeric) first declension Greek nouns and adjectives had been formed in exactly the same way as in Latin: nephelēgeréta Zeus ('Zeus the cloud-gatherer') had in classical Greek become nephelēgerétēs.

For full paradigm tables and more detailed information, see the Wiktionary appendix First declension.

=== Second declension (o stems) ===
The second declension is a large group of nouns consisting of mostly masculine nouns like equus, equī ('horse') and puer, puerī ('boy') and neuter nouns like castellum, castellī ('fort'). There are several small groups of feminine exceptions, including names of gemstones, plants, trees, and some towns and cities: these take the same endings as masculine nouns.

In the nominative singular, most masculine nouns consist of the stem and the ending -us, although some end in -er, which is not necessarily attached to the complete stem. Neuter nouns generally have a nominative singular consisting of the stem and the ending -um. Regardless of gender, every second-declension noun has the ending -ī attached as a suffix to the stem of the noun in the genitive singular form. The predominant letter in the ending forms of this declension is o.

Second declension paradigm
	Singular		Plural	
	Masculine	Neuter	Masculine	Neuter
Nominative	-us	-um	-ī	-a
Vocative	-e	-um	-ī	-a
Accusative	-um	-um	-ōs	-a
Genitive	-ī		-ōrum	
Dative & Ablative	-ō		-īs	
Locative	Gen.		Dat.	

Masculine
	dominus, dominī master m.	
	Singular	Plural
Nominative	dominus	dominī
Vocative	domine	dominī
Accusative	dominum	dominōs
Genitive	dominī	dominōrum
Dative & Ablative	dominō	dominīs

Neuter
	bellum, bellī war n.	
	Singular	Plural
Nominative, Vocative & Accusative	bellum	bella
Genitive	bellī	bellōrum
Locative	bellī	bellīs
Dative, Ablative	bellō	bellīs

The locative endings for the second declension are -ī (singular) and -īs (plural); Corinthī "at Corinth", Mediolānī "at Milan", and Philippīs "at Philippi".

==== Second-declension -ius and -ium nouns ====
Nouns ending in -ius and -ium have a genitive singular in -ī in earlier Latin, which was regularized to -iī in the later language. Masculine nouns in -ius have a vocative singular in -ī at all stages. These forms in -ī are stressed on the same syllable as the nominative singular, sometimes in violation of the usual Latin stress rule. For example, the genitive and vocative singular Vergilī (from Vergilius) is pronounced Vergílī, with stress on the penult, even though it is short. In Old Latin, however, the vocative was declined regularly, using -ie instead, e.g. fīlie "[O] son", archaic vocative of fīlius.

There is no contraction of -iī(s) in plural forms and in the locative.

	fīlius, filiī son m.		auxilium, auxiliī aid, help n.	
	Singular	Plural	Singular	Plural
Nominative	fīlius	fīliī	auxilium	auxilia
Vocative	fīlī	fīliī	auxilium	auxilia
Accusative	fīlium	fīliōs	auxilium	auxilia
Genitive	fīliī	fīliōrum	auxiliī	auxiliōrum
Dative & Ablative	fīliō	fīliīs	auxiliō	auxiliīs

In the older language, nouns ending with -vus, -quus and -vum take o rather than u in the nominative and accusative singular. For example, servus, servī ('slave') could be servos, accusative servom.

==== Second-declension -r nouns ====
Some masculine nouns of the second declension end in -er or -ir in the nominative singular. The declension of these nouns is identical to that of the regular second declension, except for the lack of suffix in the nominative and vocative singular.

Some (but not all) nouns in -er drop the e in the genitive and other cases. For example, socer, socerī ('father-in-law') keeps its e. However, the noun magister, magistrī ('(school)master') drops its e in the genitive singular.

For declension tables of second-declension nouns, see the corresponding Wiktionary appendix.

	puer, puerī boy m.		ager, agrī field m.		vir, virī man m.	
	Singular	Plural	Singular	Plural	Singular	Plural
Nominative & Vocative	puer	puerī	ager	agrī	vir	virī
Accusative	puerum	puerōs	agrum	agrōs	virum	virōs
Genitive	puerī	puerōrum	agrī	agrōrum	virī	virōrum (virum)
Dative & Ablative	puerō	puerīs	agrō	agrīs	virō	virīs

The vocative puere is found but only in Plautus. The genitive plural virum is found in poetry.

==== Second-declension Greek nouns ====
The second declension contains two types of masculine Greek nouns and one form of neuter Greek noun. These nouns are irregular only in the singular, as are their first-declension counterparts. Greek nouns in the second declension are derived from the Omicron declension.

Some Greek nouns may also be declined as normal Latin nouns. For example, theātron can appear as theātrum.

==== Irregular forms ====
===== Deus =====
The inflection of deus, deī ('god') is irregular. The vocative singular of deus is not attested in Classical Latin. In Ecclesiastical Latin the vocative of Deus ('God') is Deus.

In poetry, -um may substitute -ōrum as the genitive plural ending.

	deus, deī god m.	
	Singular	Plural
Nominative & Vocative	deus	deī diī dī
Accusative	deum	deōs
Genitive	deī	deōrum deum
Dative & Ablative	deō	deīs diīs dīs

===== Virus =====
Three words, although second declension neuter, end in -us. These are vulgus "common people, crowd", vīrus "slime, poison", and (borrowed from Greek) pelagus "sea".

The word vīrus means "1. slimy liquid, slime; 2. poison, venom", denoting the venom of a snake. This Latin word is probably related to the Greek ῑ̓ός (ios) meaning "venom" or "rust" and the Sanskrit word विष viṣa meaning "toxic, poison".

Since vīrus in antiquity denoted something uncountable, it was a mass noun. Mass nouns pluralize only under special circumstances, hence the non-existence of plural forms in the texts.

In Classical Latin, the noun is either indeclinable (all case forms are vīrus) or declined according to the second declension, but with the ending -us instead of -um in the nominative, vocative and accusative.

In Neo-Latin, a plural form is necessary in order to express the modern concept of 'viruses', which leads to the following declension:

	vīrus, vīrī poison, venom, virus n.	
	Singular	Plural
Nominative, Vocative & Accusative	vīrus	vīra
Genitive	vīrī (Note: antique, heteroclitic: vīrus)	vīrōrum
Dative & Ablative	vīrō	vīrīs

=== Third declension ===
The third declension is the largest group of nouns. The nominative singular of these nouns may end in -a, -e, -ī, -ō, -y, -c, -l, -n, -r, -s, -t, or -x. This group of nouns includes masculine, feminine, and neuter nouns.

==== Consonant stems ====
The stem of a consonant-stem noun may be found from the genitive case by removing the ending -is. For example, the stem of pāx, pācis f. 'peace' is pāc-, the stem of flūmen, flūminis n. 'river' is flūmin-, and the stem of flōs, flōris m. 'flower' is flōr-.

Masculine, feminine and neuter nouns often have their own special nominative singular endings. For instance, many masculine nouns end in -or (amor, amōris, 'love'). Many feminine nouns end in -īx (phoenīx, phoenīcis, 'phoenix'), and many neuter nouns end in -us with an r stem in the oblique cases (onus, oneris 'burden'; tempus, temporis 'time').

Third declension paradigm (consonant stems)
	Masculine & feminine		Neuter	
	Singular	Plural	Singular	Plural
Nominative & Vocative	(-s)	-ēs	— (Note: The nominative, accusative and vocative of neuter nouns are always the same.)	-a
Accusative	-em	-ēs	—	-a
Genitive	-is	-um	-is	-um
Dative	-ī	-ibus	-ī	-ibus
Ablative	-e	-ibus	-e	-ibus
Locative	Dat./Abl.	Dat.	Dat./Abl.	Dat.

	dux, ducis leader m.		virtūs, virtūtis virtue f.		nōmen, nōminis name n.	
	Singular	Plural	Singular	Plural	Singular	Plural
Nominative & Vocative	dux	ducēs	virtūs	virtūtēs	nōmen	nōmina
Accusative	ducem	ducēs	virtūtem	virtūtēs	nōmen	nōmina
Genitive	ducis	ducum	virtūtis	virtūtum	nōminis	nōminum
Dative	ducī	ducibus	virtūtī	virtūtibus	nōminī	nōminibus
Ablative	duce	ducibus	virtūte	virtūtibus	nōmine	nōminibus

The locative endings for the third declension are -ī or -e (singular) and -ibus (plural), as in rūrī 'in the country' and Trallibus 'at Tralles'.

==== Third declension i-stem and mixed nouns ====
The third declension also has a set of nouns that are declined differently. They are called i-stems. i-stems are broken into two subcategories: pure and mixed. Pure i-stems are indicated by special neuter endings. Mixed i-stems are indicated by the double consonant rule. Stems indicated by the parisyllabic rule are usually mixed, occasionally pure.

Masculine and feminine
Parisyllabic rule: Some masculine and feminine third-declension i-stem nouns have the same number of syllables in the genitive and the nominative. For example: nāvis, nāvis ('ship'); nūbēs, nūbis ('cloud'). The nominative ends in -is or -ēs.
Double consonant rule: The rest of the masculine and feminine third-declension i-stem nouns have two consonants before the -is in the genitive singular. For example: pars, partis ('part').
Neuter
Special neuter ending: Neuter third-declension i-stems have no rule. However, all of them end in -al, -ar or -e. For example: animal, animālis ('animal'); cochlear, cochleāris ('spoon'); mare, maris ('sea').

The mixed declension is distinguished from the consonant type only by having -ium in the genitive plural (and occasionally -īs in the accusative plural). The pure declension is characterized by having -ī in the ablative singular, -ium in the genitive plural, -ia in the nominative and accusative plural neuter, and -im in the accusative singular masculine and feminine (however, adjectives have -em).

The accusative plural ending -īs is found in early Latin up to Virgil, but from the early empire onwards it was replaced by -ēs.

The accusative singular ending -im is found only in a few words: always in tussis 'cough', sitis 'thirst', Tiberis 'River Tiber'; usually in secūris 'axe', turris 'tower', puppis 'poop', febris 'fever'; occasionally in nāvis 'ship'. Most nouns, however, have accusative singular -em. The ending -im is not found in any adjectives, even those that have a separate feminine such as celeris 'swift' or ācris 'keen', or in any masculine common nouns.

The ablative singular -ī is found in nouns which have -im, and also, optionally, in some other nouns, e.g. in ignī or in igne 'in the fire'.

There are two mixed-declension neuter nouns: cor, cordis ('heart') and os, ossis ('bone'). The mixed declension is also used in the plural-only adjective plūrēs, plūra ('most').

Third declension paradigm (i-stem nouns)
	Masculine & Feminine		Neuter	
	Singular	Plural	Singular	Plural
Nominative & Vocative	—	-ēs	—	-ia
Accusative	-em -im	-ēs -īs	—	-ia
Genitive	-is	-ium	-is	-ium
Dative	-ī	-ibus	-ī	-ibus
Ablative	-e -ī	-ibus	-ī	-ibus
Locative	Dat./Abl.	Dat.	Dat./Abl.	Dat.

Third declension paradigm (mixed nouns)
	Masculine & Feminine		Neuter	
	Singular	Plural	Singular	Plural
Nominative & Vocative	—	-ēs	—	-a
Accusative	-em	-ēs -īs	—	-a
Genitive	-is	-ium	-is	-ium
Dative	-ī	-ibus	-ī	-ibus
Ablative	-e	-ibus	-e	-ibus
Locative	Dat./Abl.	Dat.	Dat./Abl.	Dat.

	turris, turris tower f. (pure)		pars, partis part, piece f. (mixed)		animal, animālis animal, living being n. (pure)	
	Parisyllabic rule		Double consonant rule		Special neuter ending	
	Singular	Plural	Singular	Plural	Singular	Plural
Nominative & Vocative	turris	turrēs	pars	partēs	animal	animālia
Accusative	turrem turrim	turrēs turrīs	partem	partēs partīs	animal	animālia
Genitive	turris	turrium	partis	partium	animālis	animālium
Dative	turrī	turribus	partī	partibus	animālī	animālibus
Ablative	turre turrī	turribus	parte (partī)	partibus	animālī	animālibus

The rules for determining i-stems from non-i-stems and mixed i-stems are guidelines rather than rules: many words that might be expected to be i-stems according to the parisyllabic rule actually are not, such as canis ('dog') or iuvenis ('youth'), which have genitive plural canum 'of dogs' and iuvenum 'of young men'. Likewise, pater ('father'), māter ('mother'), frāter ('brother'), and parēns ('parent') violate the double-consonant rule. This fluidity even in Roman times resulted in much more uncertainty in Medieval Latin.

Some nouns in -tāt-, such as cīvitās, cīvitātis 'city, community' can have either consonant-stem or i-stem genitive plural: cīvitātum or cīvitātium 'of the cities'.

==== Peculiarities ====
In the third declension, there are four irregular nouns.

Case	vīs, vīs force, power f.		sūs, suis swine, pig, hog m.f.		bōs, bovis ox, bullock m.f.		Iuppiter, Iovis Jupiter m.
Case	Singular	Plural	Singular	Plural	Singular	Plural	Singular
Nominative & Vocative	vīs	vīrēs	sūs	suēs	bōs (Note: Here ō or ū come from Old Latin ou. Thus bō-/bū- and Iū- before consonant endings are alternate developments of the bov- and Iov- before vowel endings. — The double pp in the preferred form Iu-ppiter "Father Jove" is an alternate way of marking the length of the u in the etymological form Iū-piter (see footnote in Jupiter (mythology)). i is weakened from a in pater (Allen and Greenough, sect. 79 b).)	bovēs	Iuppiter; Iūpiter
Accusative	vim	vīrēs vīrīs	suem	suēs	bovem	bovēs	Iovem
Genitive	vīs (Note: Genitive and dative cases are seldom used.)	vīrium	suis	suum	bovis	boum bovum	Iovis
Dative	vī	vīribus	suī	suibus sūbus	bovī	bōbus būbus	Iovī
Ablative	vī	vīribus	sue	suibus sūbus	bove	bōbus būbus	Iove

=== Fourth declension (u stems) ===
The fourth declension is a group of nouns consisting of mostly masculine words such as flūctus, flūctūs m. ('wave') and portus, portūs m. ('port') with a few feminine exceptions, including manus, manūs f. ('hand') and domus, domūs f. ('house'). The fourth declension also includes several neuter nouns including genū, genūs n. ('knee'). Each noun has the ending -ūs as a suffix attached to the root of the noun in the genitive singular form. The predominant letter in the ending forms of this declension is u, but the declension is otherwise very similar to the third-declension i stems.

Fourth declension paradigm
	-us ending nouns		-ū ending nouns	
	Singular	Plural	Singular	Plural
Nominative & Vocative	-us	-ūs	-ū	-ua
Accusative	-um	-ūs	-ū	-ua
Genitive	-ūs	-uum	-ūs	-uum
Dative	-uī	-ibus -ubus (Note: used only on bisyllabic words like arcus and artus.)	-ū	-ibus
Ablative	-ū	-ibus -ubus	-ū	-ibus
Locative	-ī	Dat.	-ī	Dat.

	portus, portūs port m.		genū, genūs knee n.	
	Singular	Plural	Singular	Plural
Nominative & Vocative	portus	portūs	genū	genua
Accusative	portum	portūs	genū	genua
Genitive	portūs	portuum	genūs	genuum
Dative	portuī	portibus	genū	genibus
Ablative	portū	portibus	genū	genibus

- In the genitive singular, cornūs may in later times be replaced by cornū.
- The locative endings for the fourth declension are -ī (singular) and -ibus (plural); senātī "at [the] senate", domī "at home".

==== Domus ====
Domus ('house, dwelling, building, home, native place, family, household, race') is an irregular noun, mixing fourth and second declension forms at the same time (especially in literature). However, in practice, it is generally declined as a regular -us stem fourth declension noun, except for ablative singular -ō, accusative plural -ōs, and the use of the locative.

	domus, domūs/domī f.	
All possible declensions
	Singular	Plural
Nominative & Vocative	domus	domūs
Accusative	domum	domōs
Accusative	domum	domūs
Genitive	domūs	domuum
Genitive	domī	domōrum
Dative	domuī	domibus
Dative	domō	domibus
Dative	domō	domibus
Ablative	domō	domibus
Ablative	domū	domibus
Locative	domī	domibus

	domus, domūs f.	
Most common paradigm
	Singular	Plural
Nominative & Vocative	domus	domūs
Accusative	domum	domōs
Genitive	domūs	domuum
Dative	domuī	domibus
Ablative	domō	domibus
Locative	domī	domibus

=== Fifth declension (e stems) ===
The fifth declension is a small group of nouns consisting of mostly feminine nouns like rēs, reī f. ('affair, matter, thing') and diēs, diēī m. ('day'; but f. in names of days).

Fifth declension paradigm
	-iēs ending nouns		-ēs ending nouns	
	Singular	Plural	Singular	Plural
Nominative & Vocative	-iēs	-iēs	-ēs	-ēs
Accusative	-iem	-iēs	-em	-ēs
Genitive	-iēī	-iērum	-eī	-ērum
Dative	-iēī	-iēbus	-eī	-ēbus
Ablative & Locative	-iē	-iēbus	-ē	-ēbus

	diēs, diēī day m., f.		rēs, reī thing f.	
	Singular	Plural	Singular	Plural
Nominative & Vocative	diēs	diēs	rēs	rēs
Accusative	diem	diēs	rem	rēs
Genitive	diēī	diērum	reī	rērum
Dative	diēī	diēbus	reī	rēbus
Ablative & Locative	diē	diēbus	rē	rēbus

Nouns ending in -iēs have long ēī in the dative and genitive, while nouns ending in a consonant + -ēs usually have short eī in these cases. Other forms of the genitive singular are also found, such as diī (Aeneid 1.636), diē (Georgic 1.208), diēs (Ennius).

The locative ending of the fifth declension was -ē (singular only), identical to the ablative singular, as in hodiē ('today').

== Pronouns ==
=== Personal pronouns ===
The first and second persons are irregular, and both pronouns are indeclinable for gender; and the third person reflexive pronoun sē, suī always refers back to the subject, regardless of whether the subject is singular or plural.

	First Person		Second Person		Third Person	
	ego, nōs I, we		tū, vōs thou, you		sē, suī himself, herself, itself, oneself, themselves	
	Singular	Plural	Singular	Plural	Singular	Plural
Vocative	—		tū	vōs	—	
Nominative	ego egō	nōs	tū	vōs	—	
Accusative	mē	nōs	tē	vōs	sē sēsē	
Genitive complements	meī	nostrī	tuī	vestrī	suī	
Genitive partitive	—	nostrum	—	vestrum	—	
Dative	mihi mihī	nōbīs	tibi tibī	vōbīs	sibi sibī	
Ablative	mē	nōbīs	tē	vōbīs	sē sēsē	

The genitive forms meī, tuī, nostrī, vestrī, suī are used as complements in certain grammatical constructions, whereas nostrum, vestrum are used with a partitive meaning ('[one] of us', '[one] of you'). To express possession, the possessive pronouns (essentially adjectives) meus, tuus, noster, vester are used, declined in the first and second declensions to agree in number and case with the thing possessed, e.g. pater meus 'my father', māter mea 'my mother'. The vocative singular masculine of meus is mī: mī Attice 'my dear Atticus'.

==== Possessive pronouns' declensions ====
	meus, mea, meum my, mine					
	Singular			Plural		
	Masculine	Feminine	Neuter	Masculine	Feminine	Neuter
Nominative	meus	mea	meum	meī	meae	mea
Vocative	mī meus	mea	meum	meī	meae	mea
Accusative	meum	meam	meum	meōs	meās	mea
Genitive	meī	meae	meī	meōrum	meārum	meōrum
Dative	meō	meae	meō	meīs		
Ablative	meō	meā	meō	meīs		

	tuus, tua, tuum your, yours (for singular possessor)					
	Singular			Plural		
	Masculine	Feminine	Neuter	Masculine	Feminine	Neuter
Nominative	tuus	tua	tuum	tuī	tuae	tua
Accusative	tuum	tuam	tuum	tuōs	tuās	tua
Genitive	tuī	tuae	tuī	tuōrum	tuārum	tuōrum
Dative	tuō	tuae	tuō	tuīs		
Ablative	tuō	tuā	tuō	tuīs		

	suus, sua, suum his, her, its, theirs (reflexive)					
	Singular			Plural		
	Masculine	Feminine	Neuter	Masculine	Feminine	Neuter
Nominative	suus	sua	suum	suī	suae	sua
Accusative	suum	suam	suum	suōs	suās	sua
Genitive	suī	suae	suī	suōrum	suārum	suōrum
Dative	suō	suae	suō	suīs		
Ablative	suō	suā	suō	suīs		

	noster, nostra, nostrum our, ours					
	Singular			Plural		
	Masculine	Feminine	Neuter	Masculine	Feminine	Neuter
Nominative & Vocative	noster	nostra	nostrum	nostrī	nostrae	nostra
Accusative	nostrum	nostram	nostrum	nostrōs	nostrās	nostra
Genitive	nostrī	nostrae	nostrī	nostrōrum	nostrārum	nostrōrum
Dative	nostrō	nostrae	nostrō	nostrīs		
Ablative	nostrō	nostrā	nostrō	nostrīs		

The possessive adjective vester has an archaic variant, voster; similar to noster. Vocative of meus is usually mī, and rarely meus also, like the nominative.

	vester, vestra, vestrum your, yours (for plural possessor)					
	Singular			Plural		
	Masculine	Feminine	Neuter	Masculine	Feminine	Neuter
Nominative	vester voster	vestra vostra	vestrum vostrum	vestrī vostrī	vestrae vostrae	vestra vostra
Accusative	vestrum vostrum	vestram vostram	vestrum vostrum	vestrōs vostrōs	vestrās vostrās	vestra vostra
Genitive	vestrī vostrī	vestrae vostrae	vestrī vostrī	vestrōrum vostrōrum	vestrārum vostrārum	vestrōrum vostrōrum
Dative	vestrō vostrō	vestrae vostrae	vestrō vostrō	vestrīs vostrīs		
Ablative	vestrō vostrō	vestrā vostrā	vestrō vostrō	vestrīs vostrīs		

Usually, to show the ablative of accompaniment, cum would be placed before the ablative form. However, with personal pronouns (first and second person), the reflexive and the interrogative, -cum is added onto the end of the ablative form. That is: mēcum 'with me', nōbīscum 'with us', tēcum 'with you', vōbīscum, sēcum and quōcum (sometimes quīcum).

Pronouns have also an emphatic form bi using the suffix -met (egomet, tūte/tūtemet, nosmet, vosmet), used in all cases, except by the genitive plural forms.

In accusative case, the forms mēmē and tētē exist as emphatic, but they are not widely used.

Sē, suī has a possessive adjective: suus, sua, suum, meaning 'his/her/its/their own':

Patrem suum numquam vīderat. (Cicero)
"He had never seen his [own] father."

When 'his' or 'her' refers to someone else, not the subject, the genitive pronoun eius (as well as eōrum and eārum) 'of him' is used instead of suus:

Fit obviam Clodiō ante fundum eius. (Cicero)
"He met Clodius in front of the latter's farm."

Despite its resemblance to the possessive adjectives meus, tuus and suus, eius does not decline in agreement with the noun it refers to, in the way that an adjective would. For instance, "his father" in the accusative is patrem eius (literally, "father of him"), not patrem *eium, in contrast with the reflexive formation patrem suum ("his [own] father").

When one sentence is embedded inside another with a different subject, sē and suus can refer to either subject:

Patrēs conscrīptī ... lēgātōs in Bīthȳniam miserunt quī ab rēge peterent, nē inimīcissimum suum secum haberet sibique dēderet. (Nepos)
"The senators ... sent ambassadors to Bithynia, who were to ask the king not to keep their greatest enemy with him but hand him over to them."

For the third-person pronoun is 'he', see below.

=== Demonstrative pronouns and adjectives ===
Relative, demonstrative and indefinite pronouns are generally declined like first and second declension adjectives, with the following differences:

- the nominatives are often irregular
- the genitive singular ends in -īus rather than -ae or -ī.
- the dative singular ends in -ī: rather than -ae or -ō.

These differences characterize the pronominal declension, and a few special adjectives (tōtus 'whole', sōlus 'alone', ūnus 'one', nūllus 'no', alius 'another', alter 'another [of two]', etc.) are also declined according to this pattern.

All demonstrative, relative, and indefinite pronouns in Latin can also be used adjectivally, with some small differences; for example in the interrogative pronoun, quis 'who?' and quid 'what?' are usually used for the pronominal form, quī and quod 'which?' for the adjectival form.

=== Third person pronoun ===
The weak demonstrative pronoun is, ea, id 'that' also serves as the third person pronoun 'he, she, it':

	Third person					
is, ea, id he, she, it
	Singular			Plural		
	Masculine	Feminine	Neuter	Masculine	Feminine	Neuter
Nominative	is	ea	id	eī iī	eae	ea
Accusative	eum	eam	id	eōs	eās	ea
Genitive	eius			eōrum	eārum	eōrum
Dative	eī			eīs iīs		
Ablative	eō	eā	eō	eīs iīs		

This pronoun is also often used adjectivally, e.g. is homo 'that man', ea pecunia 'that money'. It has no possessive adjective; the genitive is used instead: pater eius 'his/her father'; pater eōrum 'their father'.

=== Declension of īdem ===
The pronoun or pronominal adjective īdem, eadem, idem means 'the same'. It is derived from is with the suffix -dem. However, some forms have been assimilated.

	īdem, eadem, idem the same, same as					
	Singular			Plural		
	Masculine	Feminine	Neuter	Masculine	Feminine	Neuter
Nominative	īdem	eadem	idem	eīdem īdem iīdem	eaedem	eadem
Accusative	eundem	eandem	idem	eōsdem	eāsdem	eadem
Genitive	eiusdem			eōrundem	eārundem	eōrundem
Dative	eīdem			eīsdem īsdem iīsdem		
Ablative	eōdem	eādem	eōdem	eīsdem īsdem iīsdem		

=== Other demonstrative pronouns ===
	hic, haec, hoc this, this one (proximal)						ille, illa, illud that, that one (distal)						iste, ista, istud that of yours (medial)					
	Singular			Plural			Singular			Plural			Singular			Plural		
	Masculine	Feminine	Neuter	Masculine	Feminine	Neuter	Masculine	Feminine	Neuter	Masculine	Feminine	Neuter	Masculine	Feminine	Neuter	Masculine	Feminine	Neuter
Nominative	hic	haec	hoc	hī	hae	haec	ille	illa	illud	illī	illae	illa	iste	ista	istud	istī	istae	ista
Accusative	hunc	hanc	hoc	hōs	hās	haec	illum	illam	illud	illōs	illās	illa	istum	istam	istud	istōs	istās	ista
Genitive	huius (Note: Sometimes spelled hūius. Here, the macron indicates that the syllable is long or heavy, because the consonantal i between vowels is pronounced double, like *huiius, and the doubled consonant makes the first syllable heavy.)			hōrum	hārum	hōrum	illīus			illōrum	illārum	illōrum	istīus			istōrum	istārum	istōrum
Dative	huic			hīs			illī			illīs			istī			istīs		
Ablative	hōc	hāc	hōc	hīs			illō	illā	illō	illīs			istō	istā	istō	istīs		

Similar in declension is alius, alia, aliud 'another'.

=== Intensive pronoun ===
	ipse, ipsa, ipsum himself, herself, itself					
	Singular			Plural		
	Masculine	Feminine	Neuter	Masculine	Feminine	Neuter
Nominative	ipse	ipsa	ipsum	ipsī	ipsae	ipsa
Accusative	ipsum	ipsam	ipsum	ipsōs	ipsās	ipsa
Genitive	ipsīus			ipsōrum	ipsārum	ipsōrum
Dative	ipsī			ipsīs		
Ablative	ipsō	ipsā	ipsō	ipsīs		

=== Interrogative pronouns ===
The interrogative pronouns are used strictly for asking questions. They are distinct from the relative pronoun and the interrogative adjective (which is declined like the relative pronoun). Interrogative pronouns rarely occur in the plural. The plural interrogative pronouns are the same as the plural relative pronouns.

Singular
	quis? quid? who?, what?	
	Masculine & Feminine	Neuter
Nominative	quis?	quid?
Accusative	quem?	quid?
Genitive	cuius? (Note: Sometimes spelled cūius. Here, the macron indicates that the syllable is long or heavy, because the consonantal i between vowels is pronounced double, like *cuiius, and the doubled consonant makes the first syllable heavy.)	
Dative	cui?	
Ablative	quō?	

=== Relative pronouns ===
	quī, quae, quod who, which, that					
	Singular			Plural		
	Masculine	Feminine	Neuter	Masculine	Feminine	Neuter
Nominative	quī	quae	quod	quī	quae	quae
Accusative	quem	quam	quod	quōs	quās	quae
Genitive	cuius			quōrum	quārum	quōrum
Dative	cui			quibus		
Ablative	quō	quā	quō	quibus		

== Adjectives ==
For the most part adjectives are declined like nouns, with the difference that adjectives can normally be used in all three genders.

Nearly all adjectives can be categorized into one of two types:

- One type takes both first and second-declension endings depending on gender: first-declension endings in the feminine, and second-declension endings in the masculine and neuter.
- The other type takes third-declension endings, with some changes in declension depending on gender. Third-declension adjectives can be categorized into several subtypes. The majority take i-stem endings in the ablative singular and in the plural, but some take consonant-stem endings.

An adjective agrees with its corresponding noun in number, gender, and case; they do not agree in declension type. Therefore, adjectives do not necessarily take the same ending as their nouns, although this often happens to be the case.

=== First- and second-declension adjectives ===
First- and second-declension adjectives are inflected in the masculine, the feminine and the neuter; the masculine form typically ends in -us (although some end in -er, see below), the feminine form ends in -a, and the neuter form ends in -um. Therefore, some adjectives are given like altus, alta, altum.

Adjectives ending -ius use the vocative -ie (ēbrie, "[O] drunk man", vocative of ēbrius), just as in Old Latin all -ius nouns did (fīlie, "[O] son", archaic vocative of fīlius).

1st and 2nd declension paradigm
	Singular			Plural		
	Masculine	Feminine	Neuter	Masculine	Feminine	Neuter
Nominative	-us	-a	-um	-ī	-ae	-a
Vocative	-e	-a	-um	-ī	-ae	-a
Accusative	-um	-am	-um	-ōs	-ās	-a
Genitive	-ī	-ae	-ī	-ōrum	-ārum	-ōrum
Dative	-ō	-ae	-ō	-īs		
Ablative	-ō	-ā	-ō	-īs		

	altus, alta, altum high, long, tall					
	Singular			Plural		
	Masculine	Feminine	Neuter	Masculine	Feminine	Neuter
Nominative	altus	alta	altum	altī	altae	alta
Vocative	alte	alta	altum	altī	altae	alta
Accusative	altum	altam	altum	altōs	altās	alta
Genitive	altī	altae	altī	altōrum	altārum	altōrum
Dative	altō	altae	altō	altīs		
Ablative	altō	altā	altō	altīs		

==== First- and second-declension -r adjectives ====
Some first- and second-declension adjectives' masculine forms end in -er. As with second-declension -r nouns, some adjectives retain the e throughout inflection, and some omit it. Sacer, sacra, sacrum omits its e while miser, misera, miserum keeps it.

1st and 2nd declension -r adjective aradigm
	Singular			Plural		
	Masculine	Feminine	Neuter	Masculine	Feminine	Neuter
Nominative & Vocative	-er	-ra	-rum	-rī	-rae	-ra
Accusative	-rum	-ram	-rum	-rōs	-rās	-ra
Genitive	-rī	-rae	-rī	-rōrum	-rārum	-rōrum
Dative	-rō	-rae	-rō	-rīs		
Ablative	-rō	-rā	-rō	-rīs		

	miser, misera, miserum sad, poor, unhappy					
	Singular			Plural		
	Masculine	Feminine	Neuter	Masculine	Feminine	Neuter
Nominative & Vocative	miser	misera	miserum	miserī	miserae	misera
Accusative	miserum	miseram	miserum	miserōs	miserās	misera
Genitive	miserī	miserae	miserī	miserōrum	miserārum	miserōrum
Dative	miserō	miserae	miserō	miserīs		
Ablative	miserō	miserā	miserō	miserīs		

	sacer, sacra, sacrum sacred, holy					
	Singular			Plural		
	Masculine	Feminine	Neuter	Masculine	Feminine	Neuter
Nominative & Vocative	sacer	sacra	sacrum	sacrī	sacrae	sacra
Accusative	sacrum	sacram	sacrum	sacrōs	sacrās	sacra
Genitive	sacrī	sacrae	sacrī	sacrōrum	sacrārum	sacrōrum
Dative	sacrō	sacrae	sacrō	sacrīs		
Ablative	sacrō	sacrā	sacrō	sacrīs		

==== First and second declension pronominal adjectives ====
Nine first and second declension pronominal adjectives are irregular in the genitive and dative singular in all genders. They can be remembered by using the mnemonic acronym ūnus nauta. They are:

- ūllus, ūlla, ūllum 'any';
- nūllus, nūlla, nūllum 'no, none';
- uter, utra, utrum 'which [of two], either';
- sōlus, sōla, sōlum 'sole, alone';
- neuter, neutra, neutrum 'neither';
- alius, alia, aliud 'another' (the genitive singular alīus is often replaced by alterīus or by aliēnus 'of another');
- ūnus, ūna, ūnum 'one';
- tōtus, tōta, tōtum 'whole';
- alter, altera, alterum 'other [of two]'.

	ūllus, ūlla, ūllum any					
	Singular			Plural		
	Masculine	Feminine	Neuter	Masculine	Feminine	Neuter
Nominative	ūllus	ūlla	ūllum	ūllī	ūllae	ūlla
Accusative	ūllum	ūllam	ūllum	ūllōs	ūllās	ūlla
Genitive	ūllīus			ūllōrum	ūllārum	ūllōrum
Dative	ūllī			ūllīs		
Ablative	ūllō	ūllā	ūllō	ūllīs		

=== Third-declension adjectives ===
Third-declension adjectives are normally declined like third-declension i-stem nouns, except for the fact they usually have -ī rather than -e in the ablative singular (unlike i-stem nouns, in which only pure i-stems have -ī). Some adjectives, however, like the one-ending vetus, veteris ('old, aged'), have -e in the ablative singular, -um in the genitive plural, and -a in the nominative and accusative neuter plural.

==== Third-declension adjectives with one ending ====
These have a single nominative ending for all genders, although as usual the endings for the other cases vary. As with nouns, a genitive is given for the purpose of showing the inflection.

One-ending 3rd declension adjective paradigm
	Singular		Plural	
	Masculine & Feminine	Neuter	Masculine & Feminine	Neuter
Nominative & Vocative	-s		-ēs	-ia
Accusative	-em	-s	-ēs -īs	-ia
Genitive	-is		-ium	
Dative & Ablative	-ī		-ibus	

	atrōx, atrōcis, atrōcia terrible, mean, cruel			
	Singular		Plural	
	Masculine & Feminine	Neuter	Masculine & Feminine	Neuter
Nominative & Vocative	atrōx		atrōcēs	atrōcia
Accusative	atrōcem	atrōx	atrōcēs atrōcīs	atrōcia
Genitive	atrōcis		atrōcium	
Dative & Ablative	atrōcī		atrōcibus	

===== Non-i-stem variant =====
	Non-i-stem one-ending 3rd declension adjective paradigm			
	Singular		Plural	
	Masculine & Feminine	Neuter	Masculine & Feminine	Neuter
Nominative & Vocative	(-s)		-ēs	-a
Accusative	-em	(-s)	-ēs	-a
Genitive	-is		-um	
Dative	-ī		-ibus	
Ablative	-e		-ibus	

	vetus, veteris, vetera old, aged			
	Singular		Plural	
	Masculine & Feminine	Neuter	Masculine & Feminine	Neuter
Nominative & Vocative	vetus		veterēs	vetera
Accusative	veterem	vetus	veterēs	vetera
Genitive	veteris		veterum	
Dative	veterī		veteribus	
Ablative	vetere		veteribus	

==== Third-declension adjectives with two endings ====
Third-declension adjectives that have two endings have one form for the masculine and feminine, and a separate form for the neuter. The ending for the masculine and feminine is -is, and the ending for the neuter is -e. It is not necessary to give the genitive, as it is the same as the nominative masculine singular.

Two-ending 3rd declension adjective paradigm
	Singular		Plural	
	Masculine & Feminine	Neuter	Masculine & Feminine	Neuter
Nominative & Vocative	-is	-e	-ēs	-ia
Accusative	-em	-e	-ēs -īs	-ia
Genitive	-is		-ium	
Dative & Ablative	-ī		-ibus	

	agilis, agile nimble, swift			
	Singular		Plural	
	Masculine & Feminine	Neuter	Masculine & Feminine	Neuter
Nominative & Vocative	agilis	agile	agilēs	agilia
Accusative	agilem	agile	agilēs agilīs	agilia
Genitive	agilis		agilium	
Dative & Ablative	agilī		agilibus	

==== Third-declension adjectives with three endings ====
Third-declension adjectives with three endings have three separate nominative forms for all three genders. Like third and second declension -r nouns, the masculine ends in -er. The feminine ends in -ris, and the neuter ends in -re. The genitive is the same as the nominative feminine singular.

Three-ending 3rd declension adjective paradigm
	Singular			Plural	
	Masculine	Feminine	Neuter	Masculine & Feminine	Neuter
Nominative & Vocative	-er	-ris	-re	-rēs	-ria
Accusative	-rem		-re	-rēs	-ria
Genitive	-ris			-rium	
Dative & Ablative	-rī			-ribus	

	celer, celeris, celere swift, rapid, brash				
	Singular			Plural	
	Masculine	Feminine	Neuter	Masculine & Feminine	Neuter
Nominative & Vocative	celer	celeris	celere	celerēs	celeria
Accusative	celerem		celere	celerēs	celeria
Genitive	celeris			celerium	
Dative & Ablative	celerī			celeribus	

	alacer, alacris, alacre lively, jovial, animated				
	Singular			Plural	
	Masculine	Feminine	Neuter	Masculine & Feminine	Neuter
Nominative & Vocative	alacer	alacris	alacre	alacrēs	alacria
Accusative	alacrem		alacre	alacrēs alacrīs	alacria
Genitive	alacris			alacrium	
Dative & Ablative	alacrī			alacribus	

=== Comparative and superlative forms of adjectives ===
As in English, adjectives have superlative and comparative forms. For regular first and second declension and third declension adjectives with one or two endings, the comparative is formed by adding -ior for the masculine and feminine, and -ius for the neuter to the stem. The genitives for both are formed by adding -iōris. Therefore, they are declined in the third declension, but they are not declined as i-stems. Superlatives are formed by adding -issimus, -issima, -issimum to the stem and are thus declined like first and second declension adjectives.

==== General pattern for comparatives ====
	altior, altius higher, deeper (comparative of altus)			
	Singular		Plural	
	Masculine & Feminine	Neuter	Masculine & Feminine	Neuter
Nominative & Vocative	altior	altius	altiōrēs	altiōra
Accusative	altiōrem	altius	altiōrēs	altiōra
Genitive	altiōris		altiōrum	
Dative	altiōrī		altiōribus	
Ablative	altiōre		altiōribus	

	altissimus, altissima, altissimum highest, deepest (superlative of altus)					
	Singular			Plural		
	Masculine	Feminine	Neuter	Masculine	Feminine	Neuter
Nominative	altissimus	altissima	altissimum	altissimī	altissimae	altissima
Vocative	altissime	altissima	altissimum	altissimī	altissimae	altissima
Accusative	altissimum	altissimam	altissimum	altissimōs	altissimās	altissima
Genitive	altissimī	altissimae	altissimī	altissimōrum	altissimārum	altissimōrum
Dative	altissimō	altissimae	altissimō	altissimīs		
Ablative	altissimō	altissimā	altissimō	altissimīs		

==== Comparatives and superlatives with normal endings ====
Positive	Comparative	Superlative
clārus, clāra, clārum ('clear, bright, famous')	clārior, clārius	clārissimus, clārissima, clārissimum
frīgidus, frīgida, frīgidum ('cold, chilly')	frīgidior, frīgidius	frīgidissimus, frīgidissima, frīgidissimum
pugnāx, pugnāx (pugnācis) ('pugnacious')	pugnācior, pugnācius	pugnācissimus, pugnācissima, pugnācissimum
benevolēns, benevolēns (benevolentis) ('kind, benevolent')	benevolentior, benevolentius	benevolentissimus, benevolentissima, benevolentissimum
fortis, forte ('strong, robust')	fortior, fortius	fortissimus, fortissima, fortissimum
aequālis, aequāle ('equal, even')	aequālior, aequālius	aequālissimus, aequālissima, aequālissimum

==== Comparatives and superlatives of -er adjectives ====
Adjectives (in the first and second as well as third declensions) that have masculine nominative singular forms ending in -er are slightly different. As with normal adjectives, the comparative is formed by adding -ior to the stem, but for the superlative, -rimus is added to the nominative masculine singular.

Positive	Comparative	Superlative
pulcher, pulchra, pulchrum ('pretty, beautiful')	pulchrior, pulchrius	pulcherrimus, pulcherrima, pulcherrimum
sacer, sacra, sacrum ('sacred, holy')	sacrior, sacrius	sacerrimus, sacerrima, sacerrimum
tener, tenera, tenerum ('delicate, tender')	tenerior, tenerius	tenerrimus, tenerrima, tenerrimum
ācer, ācris, ācre ('valliant, fierce')	ācrior, ācrius	ācerrimus, ācerrima, ācerrimum
celeber, celebris, celebre ('celebrated, famous')	celebrior, celebrius	celeberrimus, celeberrima, celeberrimum
celer, celeris, celere ('quick, fast')	celerior, celerius	celerrimus, celerrima, celerrimum

==== Comparatives and superlatives of -lis adjectives ====
Some third declension adjectives with two endings in -lis in the masculine–feminine nominative singular have irregular superlative forms. The following are the only adjectives that do.

Positive	Comparative	Superlative
facilis, facile ('easy')	facilior, facilius	facillimus, facillima, facillimum
difficilis, difficile ('hard, difficult')	difficilior, difficilius	difficillimus, difficillima, difficillimum
similis, simile ('similar, like')	similior, similius	simillimus, simillima, simillimum
dissimilis, dissimile ('unlike, dissimilar')	dissimilior, dissimilius	dissimillimus, dissimillima, dissimillimum
gracilis, gracile ('slender, slim')	gracilior, gracilius	gracillimus, gracillima, gracillimum
humilis, humile ('low, humble')	humilior, humilius	humillimus, humillima, humillimum

==== Comparatives and superlatives of -eus/-ius adjectives ====
First and second declension adjectives that end in -eus or -ius are unusual in that they do not form the comparative and superlative by taking endings at all. Instead, magis ('more') and maximē ('most'), the comparative and superlative degrees of magnoperē ('much, greatly'), respectively, are used.

Many adjectives in -uus, except those in -quus or -guus, also follow this rule.

Positive	Comparative	Superlative
idōneus, idōnea, idōneum ('suitable, fitting, proper')	magis idōneus	maximē idōneus
sōlitārius, sōlitāria, sōlitārium ('solitary, lonely')	magis sōlitārius	maximē sōlitārius
ebrius, ebria, ebrium ('drunk')	magis ebrius	maximē ebrius
meritōrius, meritōria, meritōrium ('meritorious')	magis meritōrius	maximē meritōrius
grāmineus, grāminea, grāmineum ('grassy')	magis grāmineus	maximē grāmineus
bellātōrius, bellātōria, bellātōrium ('warlike, bellicose')	magis bellātōrius	maximē bellātōrius
arduus, ardua, arduum ('lofty, steep')	magis arduus	maximē arduus

==== Irregular comparatives and superlatives ====
As in most languages, Latin has adjectives that have irregular comparatives and superlatives.

Positive	Comparative	Superlative
bonus, bona, bonum ('good')	melior, melius ('better')	optimus, optima, optimum ('best')
malus, mala, malum ('bad, evil')	pēior, pēius ('worse')	pessimus, pessima, pessimum ('worst')
magnus, magna, magnum ('great, large')	māior, māius ('greater')	maximus, maxima, maximum ('greatest')
parvus, parva, parvum ('small, slight')	minor, minus ('lesser')	minimus, minima, minimum ('least')
multus, multa, multum ('much, many')	plūs (Note: Noun used with genitive to express more of something in the singular; in the plural used as an adjective: plūrēs, plūra, genitive plūrium.) ('more')	plūrimus, plūrima, plūrimum ('most')
propinquus, propinqua, propinquum ('near, close')	propior, propius ('nearer')	proximus, proxima, proximum ('nearest, next')
mātūrus, mātūra, mātūrum ('ripe, mature')	mātūrior, mātūrius ('riper')	mātūrrimus, mātūrrima, mātūrrimum (Note: Often replaced by the regular form mātūrissimus, mātūrissima, mātūrissimum.) ('ripest')
nēquam (Note: Indeclinable.) ('worthless')	nēquior, nēquius ('more worthless')	nēquissimus, nēquissima, nēquissimum ('most worthless')
posterus, postera, posterum ('next, future')	posterior, posterius ('later')	postrēmus, postrēma, postrēmum ('last, latest') postumus, postuma, postumum
superus, supera, superum ('above')	superior, superius ('upper')	suprēmus, suprēma, suprēmum ('uppermost') summus, summa, summum
exterus, extera, exterum ('outward')	exterior, exterius ('outer')	extrēmus, extrēma, extrēmum ('outermost') extimus, extima, extimum
īnferus, īnfera, īnferum ('below')	īnferior, īnferius ('lower')	īnfimus, īnfima, īnfimum ('lowest') īmus, īma, īmum
senex, senis ('old, aged')	senior ('older, elder')	maximus nātū, maxima nātū ('oldest, eldest')
iuvenis, iuvenis ('young, youthful')	iuvenior ('younger') iūnior	minimus nātū, minima nātū ('youngest') (Note: Sometimes iunissimus is found in medieval Latin, e.g. Callistus Nicephorus, Ecclesiastica Historia, 1574.)

== Numerals ==
There are several different kinds of numeral words in Latin: the two most common are cardinal numerals and ordinal numerals. There are also several more rare numerals, e.g., distributive numerals and adverbial numerals.

=== Cardinal numerals ===
All cardinal numerals are indeclinable, except ūnus ('one'), duo ('two'), trēs ('three'), plural hundreds ducentī ('two hundred'), trecentī ('three hundred') etc., and mīlle ('thousand'), which have cases and genders like adjectives. Ūnus, ūna, ūnum is declined like a first- and second-declension pronoun with -īus or -ius in the genitive, and -ī in the dative. Duo is declined irregularly, trēs is declined like a third-declension plural adjective, -centī ('hundred') numerals decline like first- and second-declension adjectives, and mīlle is invariable in the singular and declined like a third-declension i-stem neuter noun in the plural:

The plural endings for ūnus are used with plūrālia tantum nouns, e. g. ūna castra (one [military] camp), ūnae scālae (one ladder).

	ūnus, ūna, ūnum one					
	Singular			Plural		
	Masculine	Feminine	Neuter	Masculine	Feminine	Neuter
Nominative	ūnus	ūna	ūnum	ūnī	ūnae	ūna
Vocative	ūne	ūna	ūnum	ūnī	ūnae	ūna
Accusative	ūnum	ūnam	ūnum	ūnōs	ūnās	ūna
Genitive	ūnīus / ūnius			ūnōrum	ūnārum	ūnōrum
Dative	ūnī			ūnīs		
Ablative	ūnō	ūnā	ūnō	ūnīs		

The word ambō ('both'), is declined like duo except that its o is long. Both declensions derive from the Indo-European dual number, otherwise defunct in Latin, rather than the plural.

	duo, duae, duo two		
Plural
	Masculine	Feminine	Neuter
Nominative & Vocative	duo	duae	duo
Accusative	duō(s)	duās	duo
Genitive	duōrum	duārum	duōrum
Dative & Ablative	duōbus	duābus	duōbus

	ambō, ambae, ambō both		
Plural
	Masculine	Feminine	Neuter
Nominative & Vocative	ambō	ambae	ambō
Accusative	ambō(s)	ambās	ambō
Genitive	ambōrum	ambārum	ambōrum
Dative & Ablative	ambōbus	ambābus	ambōbus

	trēs, tria three	
Plural
	Masculine & Feminine	Neuter
Nominative & Vocative	trēs	tria
Accusative	trēs / trīs	tria
Genitive	trium	
Dative & Ablative	tribus	

The numeral centum ('one hundred') is indeclinable, but all the other hundred numerals are declinable (ducentī, trecentī, quadringentī, quīngentī, sescentī, septingentī, octingentī, nōngentī).

	ducentī, ducentae, ducenta two hundred		
Plural
	Masculine	Feminine	Neuter
Nominative & Vocative	ducentī	ducentae	ducenta
Accusative	ducentōs	ducentās	ducenta
Genitive	ducentōrum	ducentārum	ducentōrum
Dative & Ablative	ducentīs		

The word mīlle 'thousand' is a singular indeclinable adjective. However, its plural, mīlia, is a plural third-declension i-stem neuter noun. To write the phrase "four thousand horses" in Latin, the genitive is used: quattuor mīlia equōrum, literally, "four thousands of horses".

	mīlle (one) thousand	mīlia, mīlium x thousand, thousands	
Nominative, Vocative & Accusative	mīlle	mīl(l)ia	-ia
Genitive	mīlle	mīl(l)ium	-ium
Dative & Ablative	mīlle	mīl(l)ibus	-ibus

The rest of the numbers are indeclinable whether used as adjectives or as nouns.

For further information on the different sets of Latin numerals, see Latin numerals (linguistics).

== Adverbs and their comparatives and superlatives ==
Adverbs are not declined. However, adverbs must be formed if one wants to make an adjective into an adverb.

=== Adverbs from first- and second-declension adjectives ===
First and second declension adjectives' adverbs are formed by adding -ē onto their stems.

Adjective	Adverb
clārus, clāra, clārum ('clear, famous')	clārē ('clearly, famously')
validus, valida, validum ('strong, robust')	validē ('strongly, robustly')
īnfīrmus, īnfīrma, īnfīrmum ('weak')	īnfīrmē ('weakly')
solidus, solida, solidum ('complete, firm')	solidē ('completely, firmly')
integer, integra, integrum ('whole, fresh')	integrē ('wholly, freshly')
līber, lībera, līberum ('free')	līberē ('freely')

=== Adverbs from third declension adjectives ===
Typically, third declension adjectives' adverbs are formed by adding -iter to the stem. However, most third declension adjectives with one ending simply add -er to the stem.

Adjective	Adverb
prūdēns, prūdēns (prūdentis) ('prudent')	prūdenter ('prudently')
audāx, audāx (audācis) ('bold')	audācter ('boldly')
virīlis, virīle ('courageous, spirited')	virīliter ('courageously, spiritedly')
salūbris, salūbre ('wholesome')	salūbriter ('wholesomely')

=== Comparative and superlative of adverbs ===
Adverbs' comparative forms are identical to the nominative neuter singular of the corresponding comparative adjective. Adverbs' superlative forms are simply formed by attaching the regular ending -ē to the corresponding superlative adjective. As with their corresponding adjectival forms, first and second declensions adjectives ending in -eus or -ius use magis and maximē as opposed to distinct endings.

Positive	Comparative	Superlative
clārē ('clearly, famously')	clārius	clārissimē
solidē ('completely, firmly')	solidius	solidissimē
idōneē ('suitably, properly')	magis idōneē	maximē idōneē
prudenter ('prudently')	prudentius	prudentissimē
salūbriter ('wholesomely')	salūbrius	salūbrissimē

=== Irregular adverbs and their comparative and superlative forms ===
As with adjectives, there are irregular adverbs with peculiar comparative and superlative forms.

Positive	Comparative	Superlative
bene ('well')	melius ('better')	optimē ('best')
male ('badly, ill')	peius ('worse')	pessimē ('worst')
magnopere ('greatly')	magis ('more')	maximē ('most')
multum ('much, a lot')	plūs ('more')	plūrimum ('most')
parvum ('little')	minus ('less')	minimē ('least')
nēquiter ('worthlessly')	nēquius ('more worthlessly')	nēquissimē ('most worthlessly')
saepe ('often')	saepius ('more often')	saepissimē ('most often')
mātūrē ('seasonably, betimes')	mātūrius ('more seasonably')	māturrimē ('most seasonably')
prope ('near')	propius ('nearer')	proximē ('nearest, next')
nūper ('recently')	—	nūperrimē ('most recently, previously')
potis ('possible')	potius ('rather')	potissimē ('especially')
—	prius ('before, previously')	prīmō ('first')
secus ('otherwise')	sētius sequius ('less')	—

== Peculiarities within declension ==
=== Irregularity in number ===
Some nouns are only used in the singular (singulare tantum) such as:

- materials, such as aurum 'gold'

Some nouns are only used in the plural (plurale tantum), or when plural have a singular meaning such as:

- many festivals, such as Saturnālia 'Saturnalia'
- castra 'camp' and arma 'arms'; litterae 'a letter' (cf. littera 'letter of the alphabet')
- a few geographical names are plural such as Thēbae 'Thebes' (both the Greek and the Egyptian cities)

=== Indeclinable nouns ===
Indeclinable nouns are nouns which only have one form in all cases (of the singular).

- fās ('divine law')
- īnstar ('likeness')
- māne ('morning')
- nefās ('sin, abomination')
- secus ('(male or female) sex')

=== Heterogeneous nouns ===
Heterogeneous nouns are nouns which vary in respect to gender.

- A few nouns in the second declension occur in both the neuter and masculine. However, their meanings remain the same.
- Some nouns are one gender in the singular, but become another gender in the plural. They may also change in meaning.

Singular	Plural
balneum n. ('bath')	balneae f. or balnea n. ('bathhouse')
epulum n. ('feast, banquet')	epulae f. ('feast, banquet')
frēnum n. ('bridle, curb')	frēnī m. ('bridle, curb')
iocus m. ('joke, jest')	ioca n. or ioci m. ('jokes, fun')
locus m. ('place, location')	loca n. ('region'); locī m. ('places in books, arguments')
rāstrum n. ('hoe, rake')	rāstrī m. ('hoes, rakes')

=== Plurals with alternative meanings ===
Singular	Plural
aedēs, aedis f. ('building, temple')	aedēs, aedium ('rooms, house')
auxilium, auxiliī n. ('help, aid')	auxilia, auxiliōrum ('auxiliary troops')
carcer, carceris m. ('prison, cell')	carcerēs, carcerum ('starting traps')
castrum, castrī n. ('fort, castle, fortress')	castra, castrōrum ('military camp, encampment')
cōpia, copiae f. ('plenty, much, abundance')	cōpiae, copiārum ('troops')
fortūna, fortūnae f. ('luck, chance')	fortūnae, fortūnārum ('wealth, fortune')
grātia, grātiae f. ('charm, favor')	grātiae, grātiārum ('thanks')
impedīmentum, impedīmentī m. ('impediment, hindrance')	impedīmenta, impedīmentōrum ('baggage, baggage train')
littera, litterae f. ('letter [alphabet]')	litterae, litterārum ('letter [message], epistle, scholarship, literature')
mōs, mōris m. ('habit, inclination')	mōrēs, mōrum m. ('morals, character')
opera, operae f. ('trouble, pains')	operae, operārum m. ('workmen')
*ops, opis f. (Note: Nominative and dative are not attested except as the name of the goddess Ops.) ('help')	opēs, opium ('resources, wealth')
pars, partis f. ('part, piece')	partēs, partium ('office, function')

== See also ==
- Declension of Greek nouns in Latin
- Latin conjugation
- Latin mnemonics
- William Whitaker's Words
- Greek declension
