= Latin numerals =

Names of numbers in Latin

The Latin numerals are the words used to denote numbers within the Latin language. They are essentially based on their Proto-Indo-European ancestors, and the Latin cardinal numbers are largely sustained in the Romance languages. In Antiquity and during the Middle Ages they were usually represented by Roman numerals in writing.

Latin numeral roots are used frequently in modern English, particularly in the names of large numbers.

== Overview ==
The Latin language had several sets of number words used for various purposes. Some of those sets are shown in the tables below.

=== Cardinal numerals ===
The cardinal numerals are the ordinary numbers used for counting ordinary nouns ('one', 'two', 'three' and so on):

1	I	ūnus, ūna, ūnum	11	XI	ūndecim	21	XXI	vīgintī ūnus	101	CI	centum et ūnus
2	II	duo, duae, duo	12	XII	duodecim	22	XXII	vīgintī duo	200	CC	ducentī, ducentae, ducenta
3	III	trēs, tria	13	XIII	trēdecim	30	XXX	trīgintā	300	CCC	trecentī, trecentae, trecenta
4	IV	quattuor	14	XIV	quattuordecim	40	XL	quadrāgintā	400	CD	quadringentī, quadringentae, quadringenta
5	V	quīnque	15	XV	quīndecim	50	L	quīnquāgintā	500	D	quīngentī, quīngentae, quīngenta
6	VI	sex	16	XVI	sēdecim	60	LX	sexāgintā	600	DC	sescentī, sescentae, sescenta
7	VII	septem	17	XVII	septendecim	70	LXX	septuāgintā	700	DCC	septingentī, septingentae, septingenta
8	VIII	octō	18	XVIII	duodēvīgintī	80	LXXX	octōgintā	800	DCCC	octingentī, octingentae, octingenta
9	IX	novem	19	XIX	ūndēvīgintī	90	XC	nōnāgintā	900	Cↀ	nōngentī, nōngentae, nōngenta
10	X	decem	20	XX	vīgintī	100	C	centum	1000	ↀ	mīlle

The conjunction et between numerals can be omitted: vīgintī ūnus, centum ūnus. Et is not used when there are more than two words in a compound numeral: centum trīgintā quattuor. The word order in the numerals from 21 to 99 may be inverted: ūnus et vīgintī. Numbers ending in 8 or 9 are usually named in subtractive manner: duodētrīgintā, ūndēquadrāgintā. Numbers may either precede or follow their noun (see Latin word order).

Most numbers are invariable and do not change their endings:

- regnāvit Ancus annōs quattuor et vīgintī (Livy)

'Ancus reigned for 24 years'

However, the numbers 1, 2, 3, and 200, 300, etc. change their endings for gender and grammatical case. Ūnus 'one' declines like a pronoun and has genitive ūnīus (or ūnius) and dative ūnī:

The first three numbers have masculine, feminine and neuter forms fully declined as follows (click on GL or Wh to change the table to the American order as found in Gildersleeve and Lodge, or Wheelock):

Declension	1 m	f	n	2 m	f	n	3 mf	n	Br	GL	Wh
Nominative	ūnus	ūna	ūnum	duo	duae	duo	trēs	tria	1	1	1
Vocative	ūne	ūna	ūnum	duo	duae	duo	trēs	tria	2	5	6
Accusative	ūnum	ūnam	ūnum	duōs/duo	duās	duo	trēs/trīs	tria	3	4	4
Genitive	ūnīus/-ius	ūnīus	ūnīus	duōrum	duārum	duōrum	trium	trium	4	2	2
Dative	ūnī	ūnī	ūnī	duōbus	duābus	duōbus	tribus	tribus	5	3	3
Ablative	ūnō	ūnā	ūnō	duōbus	duābus	duōbus	tribus	tribus	6	6	5

- omnēs ūnius aestimēmus assis (Catullus)

'let us value them (at the value) of a single as!'

- duo ex tribus fīliīs (Curtius)

'two of his three sons'

- dīvidunt tōtam rem in duās partīs (Cicero)

'they divide the whole thing into two parts'

Mīlle '1000' is indeclinable in the singular but variable in the plural:

- dā mī bāsia mīlle, deinde centum (Catullus)

'give me a thousand kisses, then a hundred'

- mīllia aliquantō plūra quam trecenta (Augustus)

'slightly more than 300,000'

When it is plural, the noun it refers to is put in the genitive case:

- cum sex mīlibus equitum (Curtius)

'accompanied by six thousand(s) (of) cavalrymen'

Mīlle passūs '1000 paces' (plural mīlia passuum) is the Latin for a mile:

- quīcumque tē angariāverit mīlle passūs, vade cum illō et alia duo (Vulgate Bible)

'whoever compels you to walk a mile, go with him another two'

When the number is plural, the genitive passuum is sometimes omitted:

- non longius ab oppidō X mīlibus (Caesar)

'not further than 10 miles from the town'

Larger numbers such as 2000, 3000, etc. could be expressed using either cardinal numbers (e.g. duo mīlia, tria mīlia etc.) or distributive numbers (e.g. bīna mīlia, terna mīlia etc.):

- Gracchus domō cum proficīscēbātur, numquam minus terna aut quaterna mīlia hominum sequēbantur (Sallust)

'when Gracchus used to leave home, never less than three or four thousand men used to follow him'

=== Ordinal numerals ===
Ordinal numerals all decline like normal first- and second-declension adjectives. When declining two-word ordinals (thirteenth onwards), both words decline to match in gender, number and case.

- prīmus 'first'
- secundus 'second'
- tertius 'third'
- vīcēsimus/vīcēnsimus 'twentieth'

Note: secundus only means 'second' in the sense of 'following'. The adjective alter, altera, alterum meaning 'other [of two]' was more frequently used in many instances where English would use 'second'.

Ordinal numbers, not cardinal numbers, are commonly used to represent dates, because they are in the format of 'in the tenth year of Caesar', etc. which also carried over into the anno Domini system and Christian dating, e.g. annō post Chrīstum nātum centēsimō for AD 100.

1	I	prīmus	11	XI	ūndecimus	21	XXI	vīcēsimus prīmus	101	CI	centēsimus prīmus
2	II	secundus	12	XII	duodecimus	22	XXII	vīcēsimus secundus	200	CC	ducentēsimus
3	III	tertius	13	XIII	tertius decimus	30	XXX	trīcēsimus	300	CCC	trecentēsimus
4	IV	quārtus	14	XIV	quārtus decimus	40	XL	quadrāgēsimus	400	CD	quadringentēsimus
5	V	quīntus	15	XV	quīntus decimus	50	L	quīnquāgēsimus	500	D	quīngentēsimus
6	VI	sextus	16	XVI	sextus decimus	60	LX	sexāgēsimus	600	DC	sescentēsimus
7	VII	septimus	17	XVII	septimus decimus	70	LXX	septuāgēsimus	700	DCC	septingentēsimus
8	VIII	octāvus	18	XVIII	duodēvīcēsimus	80	LXXX	octōgēsimus	800	DCCC	octingentēsimus
9	IX	nōnus	19	XIX	ūndēvīcēsimus	90	XC	nōnāgēsimus	900	Cↀ	nōngentēsimus
10	X	decimus	20	XX	vīcēsimus	100	C	centēsimus	1000	ↀ	mīllēsimus

- diē septimō pervēnit (Caesar)

'he arrived on the seventh day'

=== Ordinal numerals + -ārius ===
Based on the ordinary ordinals is another series of adjectives: prīmārius 'of the first rank', secundārius 'of the second class, of inferior quality', tertiārius 'containing a third part', quārtārius 'a quarter, fourth part', quīntārius 'containing five parts', 'five-sixths', sextārius 'a one-sixth part of a congius, 'pint', and so on.

- domī suae vir prīmārius (Cicero)

'the leading man of his family'

- secundāriī pānis quīnās sēlībrās (Pliny the Elder)

'five half-pounds of second-class bread'

- tertiārum (stannum) (Pliny the Elder)

'lead alloy containing one-third white metal'

- quārtāriōs vīnī (Livy)

'quarter-pints of wine'

- quīntārius numerus (Vitruvius)

'five-sixths' (taking a sextārius as the whole)

- oleī sextārius (Celsus)

'a pint of oil'

- octāvārium vectīgal (Justinian)

'an eighth-part tax'

=== Plūrāle tantum numerals ===
Certain nouns in Latin were plurālia tantum, i.e. nouns that were plural but which had a singular meaning, for example litterae 'a letter', castra 'a camp', catēnae 'a set of chains', vestīmenta '(a set of) clothes', hibernae 'winter quarters', nūptiae 'wedding', quadrīgae 'quadriga' etc. A special series of numeral adjectives was used for counting these, namely ūnī, bīnī, trīnī, quadrīnī, quīnī, sēnī, and so on. Thus Roman authors would write: ūnae litterae 'one letter', trīnae litterae 'three letters', quīna castra 'five camps', etc.

Except for the numbers 1, 3, and 4 and their compounds, the plurale tantum numerals are identical with the distributive numerals (see below).

1	I	ūnī	11	XI	ūndēnī	21	XXI	vīcēnī ūnī	101	CI	centēnī singulī
2	II	bīnī	12	XII	duodēnī	22	XXII	vīcēnī bīnī	200	CC	ducēnī
3	III	trīnī	13	XIII	trinī dēnī	30	XXX	trīcēnī	300	CCC	trecēnī
4	IV	quadrīnī	14	XIV	quadrīnī dēnī	40	XL	quadrāgēnī	400	CD	quadringēnī
5	V	quīnī	15	XV	quīnī dēnī	50	L	quīnquāgēnī	500	D	quīngēnī
6	VI	sēnī	16	XVI	sēnī dēnī	60	LX	sexāgēnī	600	DC	sescēnī
7	VII	septēnī	17	XVII	septēnī dēnī	70	LXX	septuāgēnī	700	DCC	septingēnī
8	VIII	octōnī	18	XVIII	duodēvīcēnī	80	LXXX	octōgēnī	800	DCCC	octingēnī
9	IX	novēnī	19	XIX	ūndēvīcēnī	90	XC	nōnāgēnī	900	Cↀ	nōngēnī
10	X	dēnī	20	XX	vīcēnī	100	C	centēnī	1000	ↀ	mīllēnī

- non dīcimus bīga ūna, quadrīgae duae, nūptiae trēs, sed prō eō ūnae bīgae, bīnae quadrīgae, trīnae nūptiae (Varro)

'We don't say una biga (one two-horse chariot), duae quadrigae (two four-horse chariots), tres nuptiae (three weddings) but instead unae bigae, binae quadrigae, trinae nuptiae'.

- Tullia mea vēnit ad mē ... litterāsque reddidit trīnās (Cicero)

'My daughter Tullia came to me ... and delivered (no fewer than) three letters'

- Octāvius quīnīs castrīs oppidum circumdedit (Caesar)

'Octavius surrounded the town with five camps'

=== Distributive numerals ===
Another set of numeral adjectives, similar to the above but differing in the adjectives for 1, 3, and 4, were the distributive numerals: singulī, bīnī, ternī, quaternī, quīnī, sēnī, and so on. The meaning of these is 'one each', 'two each' (or 'in pairs') and so on, for example

- ibī turrīs cum ternīs tabulātīs ērigēbat (Julius Caesar)

'there he began erecting towers with three storeys each'

- bīnī senātōrēs singulīs cohortibus praepositī (Livy)

'a pair of senators was put in charge of each group of soldiers'.

- lēgātī ternī in Āfricam ... et in Numidiam missī (Livy)

'three ambassadors were sent to Africa, and three to Numidia'

- in singulōs equitēs ... nummōs quīnōs vīcēnōs dedērunt (Livy)

'for each individual cavalryman they gave 25 coins'

The word singulī is always plural in this sense in the classical period.

The distributive numerals are also used for multiplying:

- ter terna, quae sunt novem (Macrobius)

'three threes, which are nine'

In numbers 13 to 19, the order may be inverted, e.g. dēnī ternī instead of ternī dēnī.

1	I	singulī	11	XI	ūndēnī	21	XXI	vīcēnī singulī	101	CI	centēnī singulī
2	II	bīnī	12	XII	duodēnī	22	XXII	vīcēnī bīnī	200	CC	ducēnī
3	III	ternī	13	XIII	ternī dēnī	30	XXX	trīcēnī	300	CCC	trecēnī
4	IV	quaternī	14	XIV	quaternī dēnī	40	XL	quadrāgēnī	400	CD	quadringēnī
5	V	quīnī	15	XV	quīnī dēnī	50	L	quīnquāgēnī	500	D	quīngēnī
6	VI	sēnī	16	XVI	sēnī dēnī	60	LX	sexāgēnī	600	DC	sescēnī
7	VII	septēnī	17	XVII	septēnī dēnī	70	LXX	septuāgēnī	700	DCC	septingēnī
8	VIII	octōnī	18	XVIII	duodēvīcēnī	80	LXXX	octōgēnī	800	DCCC	octingēnī
9	IX	novēnī	19	XIX	ūndēvīcēnī	90	XC	nōnāgēnī	900	Cↀ	nōngēnī
10	X	dēnī	20	XX	vīcēnī	100	C	centēnī	1000	ↀ	mīllēnī

=== Distributive numerals + -ārius ===
Based on the distributive numerals are derived a series of adjectives ending in -ārius: singulārius 'unique', 'extraordinary', 'of one part', 'singular', bīnārius 'of two parts', ternārius 'of three parts', quaternārius 'of four parts', and so on.

1	I	singulārius	11	XI	ūndēnārius	21	XXI	?	101	CI	?
2	II	bīnārius	12	XII	duodēnārius	22	XXII	?	200	CC	ducēnārius
3	III	ternārius	13	XIII	trēdēnārius	30	XXX	trīcēnārius	300	CCC	trecēnārius
4	IV	quaternārius	14	XIV	quattuordēnārius	40	XL	quadrāgēnārius	400	CD	quadringēnārius
5	V	quīnārius	15	XV	quīndēnārius	50	L	quīnquāgēnārius	500	D	quīngēnārius
6	VI	sēnārius	16	XVI	sēdēnārius	60	LX	sexāgēnārius	600	DC	sescēnārius
7	VII	septēnārius	17	XVII	septendēnārius	70	LXX	septuāgēnārius	700	DCC	septingēnārius
8	VIII	octōnārius	18	XVIII	duodēvīcēnārius	80	LXXX	octōgēnārius	800	DCCC	octingēnārius
9	IX	novēnārius	19	XIX	ūndēvīcēnārius	90	XC	nōnāgēnārius	900	Cↀ	nōngēnārius
10	X	dēnārius	20	XX	vīcēnārius	100	C	centēnārius	1000	ↀ	mīllēnārius

Often these adjectives specify the size or weight of something. The usual meaning is 'of so many units', the units being feet, inches, men, pounds, coins, or years, according to context:

- scrobēs quaternāriī, hoc est quōquōversus pedum quattuor (Columella)

'four-foot ditches, that is, four foot long in every direction'

- quīnāria (fistula), dicta ā diametrō quīnque quadrantum (Frontinus)

'a five-digit pipe, named from its diameter of five digits'

- quīngēnāriae cohortēs (Curtius)

'five-hundred men battalions'

- quīngēnārius thōrāx (Pliny the Elder)

'a five-hundred pound suit of body armour'

- quīngēnāria poena (Gaius)

'a five-hundred as penalty' (an as was a bronze coin)

They can also be used for specifying age:

- exhērēdāta ab octōgēnāriō patre (Pliny the Younger)

'disinherited by her 80-year-old father'

Some of these words have a specialised meaning. The sēnārius was a kind of metre consisting of six iambic feet commonly used in spoken dialogue in Roman comedy. There were also metres called the septēnārius and octōnārius (see Metres of Roman comedy).

The dēnārius was a silver coin originally worth ten assēs (but later sixteen assēs); but there was also a gold dēnārius, mentioned by Pliny the Elder and Petronius, worth 25 silver dēnāriī. The silver dēnārius is often mentioned in the New Testament, and was stated to be the day's pay in the parable of the Labourers in the Vineyard.

=== Adverbial numerals ===
Adverbial numerals are (as the name states) indeclinable adverbs, but because all of the other numeral constructions are adjectives, they are listed here with them. Adverbial numerals give how many times a thing happened. semel 'once', bis 'twice', ter 'thrice, three times', quater 'four times', and so on.

1	I	semel	11	XI	ūndeciēns	21	XXI	vīciēns semel	101	CI	centiēns semel
2	II	bis	12	XII	duodeciēns	22	XXII	vīciēns bis	200	CC	ducentiēns
3	III	ter	13	XIII	trēdeciēns	30	XXX	trīciēns	300	CCC	trecentiēns
4	IV	quater	14	XIV	quattuordeciēns	40	XL	quadrāgiēns	400	CD	quadringentiēns
5	V	quīnquiēns	15	XV	quīndeciēns	50	L	quīnquāgiēns	500	D	quīngentiēns
6	VI	sexiēns	16	XVI	sēdeciēns	60	LX	sexāgiēns	600	DC	sescentiēns
7	VII	septiēns	17	XVII	septendeciēns	70	LXX	septuāgiēns	700	DCC	septingentiēns
8	VIII	octiēns	18	XVIII	duodēvīciēns	80	LXXX	octōgiēns	800	DCCC	octingentiēns
9	IX	noviēns	19	XIX	ūndēvīciēns	90	XC	nōnāgiēns	900	Cↀ	nōngentiēns
10	X	deciēns	20	XX	vīciēns	100	C	centiēns	1000	ↀ	mīlliēns

The suffix -iēns may also be spelled -iēs: quīnquiēs, sexiēs, etc.

- equidem deciēs dīxī (Plautus)

'indeed I've said it ten times already'

=== Multiplicative numerals ===
Multiplicative numerals are declinable adjectives. simplex 'single', duplex 'double', triplex 'treble', quadruplex 'fourfold', and so on.

1	I	simplex	11	XI	ūndecuplex	21	XXI	vīgintuplex simplex	101	CI	centuplex simplex
2	II	duplex	12	XII	duodecuplex	22	XXII	vīgintuplex duplex	200	CC	ducentuplex
3	III	triplex	13	XIII	trēdecuplex	30	XXX	trīgintuplex	300	CCC	trecentuplex
4	IV	quadruplex	14	XIV	quattuordecuplex	40	XL	quadrāgintuplex	400	CD	quadringentuplex
5	V	quīncuplex	15	XV	quīndecuplex	50	L	quīnquāgintuplex	500	D	quīngentuplex
6	VI	sextuplex	16	XVI	sēdecuplex	60	LX	sexāgintuplex	600	DC	sescentuplex
7	VII	septuplex	17	XVII	septendecuplex	70	LXX	septuāgintuplex	700	DCC	septingentuplex
8	VIII	octuplex	18	XVIII	duodēvīgintuplex	80	LXXX	octōgintuplex	800	DCCC	octingentuplex
9	IX	nōnuplex	19	XIX	ūndēvīgintuplex	90	XC	nōnāgintuplex	900	Cↀ	nōngentuplex
10	X	decuplex	20	XX	vīgintuplex	100	C	centuplex	1000	ↀ	mīlliplex

These numerals decline as 3rd declension adjectives:

- [Caesar] triplicem aciem instruxit (Caesar)

'(Caesar) arranged his soldiers in a triple line'

- tabellās duplicēs tenentem (Suetonius)

'holding a pair of writing tablets consisting of two leaves'

For completeness all the numbers have been given above. Not all of these numerals are attested in ancient books, however.

Based on this series of numerals there is a series of adverbs: simpliciter 'simply, frankly', dupliciter 'doubly, ambiguously', tripliciter 'in three different ways' etc., as well as verbs such as duplicāre 'to double', triplicāre 'to triple', quadruplicāre 'to make four times as much', and so on.

=== Proportional numerals ===
Proportional numerals are declinable adjectives. simplus 'simple', duplus 'twice as great', triplus 'thrice as great', quadruplus 'four times as great', and so on.

1	I	simplus	11	XI	ūndecuplus	21	XXI	vīgintuplus simplus	101	CI	centuplus simplus
2	II	duplus	12	XII	duodecuplus	22	XXII	vīgintuplus duplus	200	CC	ducentuplus
3	III	triplus	13	XIII	trēdecuplus	30	XXX	trīgintuplus	300	CCC	trecentuplus
4	IV	quadruplus	14	XIV	quattuordecuplus	40	XL	quadrāgintuplus	400	CD	quadringentuplus
5	V	quīncuplus	15	XV	quīndecuplus	50	L	quīnquāgintuplus	500	D	quīngentuplus
6	VI	sextuplus	16	XVI	sēdecuplus	60	LX	sexāgintuplus	600	DC	sescentuplus
7	VII	septuplus	17	XVII	septendecuplus	70	LXX	septuāgintuplus	700	DCC	septingentuplus
8	VIII	octuplus	18	XVIII	duodēvīgintuplus	80	LXXX	octōgintuplus	800	DCCC	octingentuplus
9	IX	nōnuplus	19	XIX	ūndēvīgintuplus	90	XC	nōnāgintuplus	900	Cↀ	nōngentuplus
10	X	decuplus	20	XX	vīgintuplus	100	C	centuplus	1000	ↀ	mīlliplus

These are often used as nouns: simplum 'the simple sum', duplum 'double the amount of money' and so on.

- duplam pecūniam in thēsaurōs repōnī (Livy)

'double the amount of money to be replaced in the treasuries'

== Linguistic details ==
=== Cardinal numbers ===
==== ūnus ====
The numeral ūnus < Old Latin oinos ‘one’, with its cognates Old Irish óen ‘one’, Gothic ains ‘one’, Ancient Greek οἴνη oínē ‘ace on dice’, and the first part of Old Church Slavonic inorogŭ ‘Unicorn’, harks back to Proto-Indo-European *Hoi̯-no-s. The genitive forms ūnīus, ūnĭus and the dative form ūnī match the pronominal declension (cf. hujus, illius etc.), the remaining forms (including a rare gen. f. ūnae) conform with those of first and second declension adjectives. Nominative and accusative forms persist within the Romance languages as numeral and also in its secondarily acquired role as indefinite article, e. g. Old French and Occitan uns, une, un, Italian un, una, Spanish un, una, Portuguese um, uma, Romanian un, o.

==== duo ====
The masculine nominative/accusative forms dŭŏ < Old Latin dŭō ‘two’ is a cognate to Old Welsh dou ‘two’, Greek δύω dýō ‘two’, Sanskrit दुवा duvā ‘two’, Old Church Slavonic dŭva ‘two’, that imply Proto-Indo-European *duu̯o-h_{1}, a Lindeman variant of monosyllabic *du̯o-h_{1}, living on in Sanskrit द्वा dvā ‘two’, and slightly altered in Gothic twai ‘two’, German zwei ‘two’ etc.; the feminine dŭae points to an ancestral form *duu̯ah_{2}-ih_{1}. Both forms bear a dual ending, which otherwise in Latin is preserved only in ambō ‘both’, and possibly in octō ‘eight’. The accusative forms dŭōs m., dŭās f., the genitive dŭom, classical dŭōrum m./n., dŭārum f., and the dative/ablative dŭōbus m./n., dŭābus f., are original Latin formations replicating nominal declension patterns; at times, duo stands in for other case forms, especially when combined with invariant numerals, e. g. duo et vīgintī ‘twenty-two’, duodētrīgintā ‘twenty-eight’.

Most Romance languages sustain an invariant form developed from the masculine accusative duōs > Spanish, Catalan, Occitan dos, French deux, Romansh duos, dus; Italian due seems to preserve the feminine nominative duae (or may have evolved from the feminine accusative duas). Portuguese inflects masculine dois and feminine duas; Romanian has doi and două, respectively.

==== trēs, tria ====
The masculine and feminine nominative form trēs ‘three’ and its cognates Gothic þreis ‘three’, Greek τρεῖς treîs ‘three’, Sanskrit त्रयः trayaḥ ‘three’ are based on Proto-Indo-European *trei̯-es; the original accusative form trīs, matching Umbrian trif, Gothic þrins, Old Irish trí, Greek τρίνς tríns < Proto-Indo-European *tri-ns, was being superseded from preclassical Latin onward. The neuter tria corresponds to Umbrian triia and Greek τρία tría. The genitive trium is a direct descendant of Proto-Indo-European *trii̯-om, unlike e. g. Greek τριῶν triôn with long -ōn < -o-om, taken from the second declension; the dative/ablative form tribus, as well as Umbrian tris < *trifos, sustains Proto-Indo-European *tri-bʰos. The Romance languages only preserve one invariant form reflecting Latin trēs > Spanish, Catalan, Occitan tres, Portuguese três, French trois, Romansh trais, treis, Romanian trei.

==== quattuor ====
The invariant numeral quattuor ‘four’ does not fully correspond to any of its cognates in other languages, as Oscan petora ‘four’, Greek τέσσαρες téssares ‘four’, Old Irish cethair ‘four’, Gothic fidwôr ‘four’, Lithuanian keturì ‘four’, Old Church Slavonic četyre ‘four’ point to a Proto-Indo-European base *kʷetu̯or-, that should appear as *quetuor in Latin; the actual -a- has been explained as epenthetic vowel emerging from a zero-grade *kʷtu̯or-. The geminate -tt- might have been established to compensate the fluctuating quality of succeeding -u- between non-syllabic glide and full vowel apparent since Old Latin; in the postclassical form quattor this sound is dropped altogether, and in most Romance languages the second syllable is subject to syncope, which then is compensated by an additional vowel at the very end of the word, as in Spanish cuatro, Portuguese quatro, Italian quattro, French, Occitan, Catalan quatre, Romanian patru.

==== quīnque ====
The cardinal number quīnque ‘five’, with its cognates Old Irish coíc ‘five’, Greek πέντε pénte ‘five’, Sanskrit पञ्च pañca ‘five’, leads back to Proto-Indo-European pénkʷe; the long -ī-, confirmed by preserved -i- in most Romance descendants, must have been transferred from the ordinal quīntus ‘fifth’, where the original short vowel had been regularly lengthened preceding a cluster with a vanishing fricative: quīntus < *quiŋxtos < *kʷuiŋkʷtos < *kʷeŋkʷ-to-s. The assimilation of antevocalic *p- to -kʷ- of the following syllable is a common feature of the Italic languages as well as the Celtic languages.

== See also ==
- en.wiktionary.org Appendix:Latin cardinal numerals
- Latin numbers 1 - 100
- Latin numbers 1 - 1,000,000
- a Brief Guide to Latin Numerals
