= Declension of Greek nouns in Latin =

The declension of nouns in Latin that are borrowed from Greek varies significantly between different types of nouns, though certain patterns are common. Many nouns, particularly proper names, in particular, are fully Latinized and declined regularly according to their stem-characteristics. Others, however, either retain their Greek forms exclusively, or have the Greek and Latin forms side by side. These variations occur principally in the singular; in the plural the declension is usually regular. Note, however, that many Greek names of the third declension in Latin pass over into the first declension in the plural; as, Thūcȳdidās, Hyperīdae, and many names in -crates (such as, Sōcratae as well as Sōcratēs).

In the vocative singular, names in -is, -ys, -ēs, -eus and -ās (Gen., -antis) form the vocative by dropping the -s from the nominative.

In the accusative singular, many proper and some common nouns, imparisyllabic, often take the Greek -a for -em. Names in -ēs, is and ys take -ēn, -in and -yn as well as -ēm, -im and ym.

A few Greek nouns in -os, mostly geographical, belong to the second declension, and sometimes have an accusative in -on such as Dēlos, Acc. Dēlon (but Dēlum in prose).

In the genitive singular, names in -ēs, parisyllabic, take -ī as well as -is. Some feminine nouns in -ô have the genitive in -ūs.

Greek names ending in -eus are declined both according to the Greek and according to the Latin second declension (but the genitive -eī and the dative -eō are often pronounced as one syllable in poets).

In the nominative plural, imparisyllabic nouns often take -es instead of -ēs and, in the accusative plural, the same nouns often take -ā instead of -ēs.

In the genitive plural, -ōn and -eōn are found in the titles of books, such as Geōrgicōn and Metamorphōseōn.

Greek neuter nouns in -ma (Gen., -matis) always make their dative and ablative plurals in -īs instead of -ibus.

== First declension ==
Proper names ending in -ē (fem.) and -ās (masc.), and many in -ēs (masc.), especially patronymics in -dēs, belong to the First declension. So do a few common nouns, as sōphistēs "sophist". Many Greek names in -ē have two forms, one Greek and one Latin: as Atalantē, -ēs, or Atalanta, -ae.

=== Declension of proper names ===
	Pēnelopē, -ēs f.	Circē, -ēs/-ae f.	Aenēās, -ae m.	Leōnidās, -ae m.	Anchīsēs, -ae m.	Alcīdēs, -ae Hercules m.
Nominative	Pēnelop-ē	Circ-ē	Aenē-ās	Leōnid-ās	Anchīs-ēs	Alcīd-ēs
Vocative	Pēnelop-ē	Circ-ē	Aenē-ā (a)	Leōnid-ā (a)	Anchīs-ē (a) (ā)	Alcīd-ē
Accusative	Pēnelop-ēn (am)	Circ-ēn (am)	Aenē-ān (am)	Leōnid-ān (am)	Anchīs-ēn (am)	Alcīd-ēn (am)
Genitive	Pēnelop-ēs (ae)	Circ-ēs (ae)	Aenē-ae	Leōnid-ae	Anchīs-ae	Alcīd-ae
Dative	Pēnelop-ae	Circ-ae	Aenē-ae	Leōnid-ae	Anchīs-ae	Alcīd-ae
Ablative	Pēnelop-ē (ā)	Circ-ē (ā)	Aenē-ā	Leōnid-ā	Anchīs-ā	Alcīd-ē (ā)

=== Declension of nouns ===
	nymphē, -ae (f.)		comētēs, -ae (m.)		xiphiās, -ae (m.)	
	`nymph`, `bride`		`comet`, `meteor`		`swordfish`	
	Singular	Plural	Singular	Plural	Singular	Plural
Nominative	nymph-ē nymph-a	nymph-ae	comēt-ēs comēt-a	comet-ae	xiphi-ās xiphi-a	xiphi-ae
Vocative	nymph-ē nymph-a	nymph-ae	comēt-ē comēt-a	comet-ae	xiphi-ā xiphi-a	xiphi-ae
Accusative	nymph-ēn nymph-am	nymph-ās	comēt-ēn comēt-am	comēt-ās	xiphi-ān xiphi-am	xiphi-ās
Genitive	nymph-ēs nymph-ae	nymph-ārum	comet-ae	comēt-ārum	xiphi-ae	xiphi-ārum
Dative	nymph-ae	nymph-īs	comet-ae	comēt-īs	xiphi-ae	xiphi-īs
Ablative	nymph-ē nymph-ā	nymph-īs	comēt-ē comēt-ā	comēt-īs	xiphi-ā	xiphi-īs

== Second declension ==
=== Declension of proper names ===
	Īlion/-um, -ī n. Troy	Panthūs, -ī m.	Androgeōs/-us, -ī m.
Nominative	Īli-on (um)	Panth-ūs	Androge-ōs (us)
Vocative	Īli-on (um)	Panth-ū	Androge-ū (e)
Accusative	Īli-on (um)	Panth-ūn (um)	Androge-ō-n-a (um)
Genitive	Īli-ī	Panth-ī	Androge-ī
Dative, Ablative	Īli-ō	Panth-ō	Androge-ō

=== Declension of nouns ===
	atomos/-us, -ī f. atom		phaenomenon/-um, -ī n. phaenomenon	
	Singular	Plural	Singular	Plural
Nominative	atom-os (us)	atom-ī	phaenomen-on (um)	phaenomen-a
Vocative	atom-e	atom-ī	phaenomen-on (um)	phaenomen-a
Accusative	atom-on (um)	atom-ōs	phaenomen-on (um)	phaenomen-a
Genitive	atom-ī	atom-ōrum	phaenomen-ī	phaenomen-ōrum
Dative, Ablative	atom-ō	atom-īs	phaenomen-ō	phaenomen-īs

== Third declension ==
=== Declension of proper names ===
	Solōn/Solō, -ōnis m.	Xenophōn, -ntis m.	Atlās, -ntis m.	Paris, -idis/-idos m.	Thalēs, -is/-ētis m.
Nominative	Sol-ō-n	Xenoph-ōn	Ātl-ās	Par-is	Thal-ēs
Vocative	Sol-ōn	Xenoph-ōn	Ātl-ā	Par-i(s)	Thal-ē
Accusative	Solōn-a (em)	Xenophōn-ta (em)	Ātlan-ta (em)	Pari-da; Pari-din (m)	Thalē-ta; Thal-ēn (em)
Genitive	Solōn-is	Xenophōn-tis	Ātlan-tis	Parid-os (is)	Thalē-tis; Thal-is
Dative	Solōn-ī	Xenophōn-tī	Ātlan-tī	Pari-dī; Pari-di	Thalē-tī; Thal-ī
Ablative	Solōn-e	Xenophōn-te	Ātlan-te	Pari-de	Thal-ē

=== Declension of nouns ===
	āēr, -eris, -eros air m. or f.		hērōs, -is hero m.		haeresis, -is sect, heresy f.	
	Singular	Plural	Singular	Plural	Singular	Plural
Nominative	ā-ēr	ā-erēs	hērō-s	hērō-ēs	haeres-is	haeres-ēs
Vocative	ā-ēr	ā-erēs	hērō-s	hērō-ēs	haeres-i (is)	haeres-ēs
Accusative	ā-era (em)	ā-erēs ā-era	hērō-a (em)	hērō-ēs	haeres-in (m) haeres-em	haeres-ēs haeres-īs
Genitive	ā-eros (is)	ā-erum	hērō-is	hērō-um	haeres-eōs haeres-i(o)s	haeres-ium
Dative	ā-erī	ā-eribus	hērō-ī	hērō-ibus	haeres-ei (ī)	haeres-ibus
Ablative	ā-ere	ā-eribus	hērō-e	hērō-ibus	haeres-ei (e) (ī)	haeres-ibus

== Fourth declension ==
=== Declension of nouns ===
	ēchō, -ūs f. echo
Singular
Nominative, Vocative	ēch-ō
Accusative	ēch-o-n
Genitive	ēch-ūs
Dative, Ablative	ēch-ō

== Mixed declension ==
=== Declension of proper names ===
	Orphēūs, -eos/-ēī m.	Athōs, -ō-nis m.	Oedipus/-ūs, -odis/-odī m.	Achillēs, -is m.	Sōcratēs, -ī/-is m.	Dīdō, -ūs/-ōnis f.
Nominative	Orph-ēūs	Ath-ōs	Oedip-us; Oedip-ūs	Achill-ēs	Sōcrat-ēs	Dīd-ō
Vocative	Orph-ēū	Ath-ōs	Oedip-ūs Oedip-e	Achill-ēs	Sōcrat-ē; Sōcrat-es	Dīd-ō
Accusative	Orph-ea (um)	Ath-ō-n-em	Oedip-oda; Oedip-um	Achill-em	Sōcrat-ēn; Sōcrat-em	Dīd-ō-nem
Genitive	Orph-eos; Orph-ēī	Ath-ō-nis	Oedip-odī; Oedip-odis	Achill-is	Sōcrat-ī; Sōcrat-is	Dīd-ūs; Dīd-ōnis
Dative	Orph-eō	Ath-ō-nī	Oedip-odī Oedip-ō	Achill-ī	Sōcrat-ī	Dīdō-ō-nī
Ablative	Orph-eō	Ath-ō-ne	Oedip-ode; Oedip-ō	Achill-e	Sōcrat-e	Dīd-ō-ne
