= Unadi-Sutras =

Sanskrit work

The Unadi-Sutras (Sanskrit उणादि-सूत्र uṇādi-sūtra-) are a group of texts in Indian grammatical tradition (Vyākaraṇa). They form an accessory to the Aṣṭādhyāyī ("Eight Chapters", the grammar of Pāṇini). They deal with Sanskrit affixes. They propose to validate the view attributed to Śākaṭāyana that all words can be analysed by the addition of affixes to verbal roots. As a consequence, the notion of "affix" for the purposes of the Unadi-Sutras is extremely loose and not necessarily etymological; the classical grammarians (such as Patañjali) were aware that this means of derivation was purely formal and in many cases had no relation to the word's actual meaning.

The authorship and date of the oldest Unadi-Sutras (known as the Panchapadi-Unadi-Sutras) is uncertain; some authors would attribute them to Pāṇini himself, others to his predecessors, such as Śākaṭāyana, Āpiśali, or Kātyāyana. The name uṇādi is derived from the incipit, as the text begins with the treatment of the affix -uṇ-. The texts survive only with substantial variation. In addition, the later grammatical schools have added numerous additional Unadi-Sutras, each particular to the respective school.

Numerous commentaries on the Unadi-Sutras proper are extant, including the Uṇādisūtravṛtti of Ujjvaladatta (13th century?), the Uṇādivṛtti of Svetavanavasin, the Prakriyasarvasva of Narayanabhatta (17th century), the Siddhanta Kaumudi and Pradhha Manorama of Bhaṭṭoji Dīkṣita (17th century), the Unadikosa of Mahadevavedantin (17th century), the Aunadikapadarnava of Perusuri (early 19th century), the Unadi-kosa of Dayananda Sarasvati (mid 19th century), the Dasapadyunadivrtti and Prasada of Manikyadeva.
