= Kāśikāvṛttī =

7th-century commentary on Pāṇini

The Kāśikāvṛtti ("the commentary of [composed or used in] Kāśi, i.e. Varanasi") is a commentary on Pāṇini, attributed to Jayāditya and Vāmana, composed in c. the 7th century.

It is considered one of the great grammar texts of Sanskrit after Pāṇini's Aṣṭādhyāyī (4th century BCE), Kātyāyana's Vārtikās (6th-4th century BCE-unclear), Patanjali's Mahabhasya (2nd century BCE), and Bhartṛhari's Vākyapadīya (6th century CE). Ekavrutti and Prachin Vrutti are the other names used for Kāśikāvṛttī. Nyasa by Jinendra Buddhi and Padamanjari by Haradatta Mishra are the famous commentaries on Kāśikāvṛtti.

== Importance ==
Vruttis prior to Kashika did not contain Ganapatha. Whereas Kashika contains Ganapatha. Kashika quotes different extinct Vruttis of scholars from the pre-paninian period. Which are not mentioned anywhere else. Examples and counterexamples included in Kashika are taken from ancient Vruttis. Hence, it provides knowledge about ancient historical facts.

== Structure ==
It is a commentary on the Ashtadhyayi. It follows the same structure. Kashika contains 8 adhyayas. These 8 adhyayas are divided into 4 padas, giving a total of 32 padas.

== See also ==
- Pāṇini
- Sanskrit grammarians
- Bhaṭṭikāvya
- Bhaṭṭoji Dīkṣita
