= Sanskrit grammar =

Grammar of the Classical Sanskrit language

The grammar of the Sanskrit language has a complex verbal system, rich nominal declension, and extensive use of compound nouns. It was studied and codified by Sanskrit grammarians from the later Vedic period (roughly 8th century BCE), culminating in the Pāṇinian grammar of the 4th century BCE.

== Grammatical tradition ==
=== Origins ===
Sanskrit grammatical tradition (vyākaraṇa, one of the six Vedanga disciplines) began in late Vedic India and culminated in the Aṣṭādhyāyī of Pāṇini.

The oldest attested form of the Proto-Indo-Aryan language as it had evolved in the Indian subcontinent after its introduction with the arrival of the Indo-Aryans is called Vedic. By 1000 BCE, the end of the early Vedic period, a large body of Vedic hymns had been consolidated into the Ṛg·Veda, which formed the canonical basis of the Vedic religion, and was transmitted from generation to generation entirely orally.

In the course of the following centuries, as the popular speech evolved, there was rising concern among the guardians of the Vedic religion that the hymns be passed on without "corruption", which for them was vital to ensure the religious efficacy of the hymns. (Note: A special type of sacrifice, the Sarasvatī, was devised to expiate errors of speech.) This led to the rise of a vigorous, sophisticated grammatical tradition involving the study of linguistic analysis, in particular phonetics alongside grammar, the high point of which was Pāṇini's stated work, which eclipsed all others before him.

=== Pāṇini ===
Pāṇini's Aṣṭādhyāyī, (Note: Pāṇini's full treatise was also referred to as śabdānuśāsana – a means of instruction (anuśāsana) of proper speech forms (śabda)) a prescriptive and generative grammar with algebraic rules governing every single aspect of the language, in an era when oral composition and transmission was the norm, is staunchly embedded in that oral tradition. In order to ensure wide dissemination, Pāṇini is said to have preferred brevity over clarity – it can be recited end-to-end in two hours. This has led to the emergence of a great number of commentaries of his work over the centuries, which for the most part adhere to the foundations laid by Pāṇini's work.

=== After Pāṇini ===
About a century after Pāṇini, Kātyāyana composed vārtikas (explanations) on the Pāṇinian sũtras. Patañjali, who lived three centuries after Pāṇini, wrote the Mahābhāṣya, the "Great Commentary" on the Aṣṭādhyāyī and Vārtikas. Because of these three ancient Sanskrit grammarians this grammar is called Trimuni Vyākarana.

Jayaditya and Vāmana wrote a commentary named Kāśikā in 600 CE. Kaiyaṭa's (12th century AD) commentary on Patañjali's Mahābhāṣya also exerted much influence on the development of grammar, but more influential was the Rupāvatāra of Buddhist scholar Dharmakīrti which popularised simplified versions of Sanskrit grammar.

The most influential work of the Early Modern period was Siddhānta Kaumudī by Bhaṭṭoji Dīkṣita (17th century). Bhaṭṭoji's disciple Varadarāja wrote three abridged versions of the original text, named Madhya Siddhānta Kaumudī, Sāra Siddhānta Kaumudī and Laghu Siddhānta Kaumudī, of which the latter is the most popular. Vāsudeva Dīkṣita wrote a commentary named Bālamanoramā on Siddhānta-Kaumudī.

European grammatical scholarship began in the 18th century with Jean François Pons and others, and culminated in the exhaustive expositions by 19th-century scholars such as Otto von Böhtlingk, William Dwight Whitney, Jacob Wackernagel and others.

=== Timeline ===
The following is a timeline of notable post-Pāṇinian grammatical figures and approximate dates:

- Kātyāyana – 300 BCE
- Patañjali – 150 BCE
- Bhartṛhari – V CE
- Kāśikā – VII
- Śākaṭāyana – IX
- Kaiyaṭa – XI
- Hemacandra – XII
- Śaraṇadeva – XII
- Vopadeva – XIII
- Bhattoji-dīkṣita – XVII

== Phonology ==
=== The sound system ===
The Sanskrit sound system can be represented in a table of place and manner of articulation:

Sanskrit sounds
	voiceless (Note: śvāsa)			voiced (Note: nāda)							
open	ḥ				h			a	ā		
velar (Note: kaṇṭhya)		k	kh	g	gh	ṅ					
palatal (Note: tālavya)	ś	c	ch	j	jh	ñ	y	i	ī	ē	ai
retroflex (Note: mūrdhanya)	ṣ	ṭ	ṭh	ḍ	ḍh	ṇ	r	ṛ	ṝ		
dental (Note: dantya)	s	t	th	d	dh	n	l	ḷ			
labial (Note: oṣṭhya)		p	ph	b	bh	m	v	u	ū	ō	au
	fric	unasp (Note: alpa·prāṇa)	asp (Note: mahā·prāṇa)	unasp	asp	nasal (Note: anunāsika)	semiv (Note: antastha)	short (Note: hrasva)	long (Note: dīrgha) (Note: twice as long as the shorts)		
		stops (Note: sparśa)						simple		diphth	
							vocalics				
	consonants (Note: vyañjana)							vowels (Note: svara)			

=== Pronunciation examples ===
The table below shows the traditional listing of the Sanskrit consonants with the nearest equivalents in English (as pronounced in General American and Received Pronunciation or wherever relevant in Indian English), French, Spanish, Russian or Polish, along with approximate IPA values.

(Further information: IPA chart (vowels and consonants) – 2015. and IPA pulmonic consonant chart with audio)

Sanskrit sound examples
	voiceless			voiced							
open	ḥ				h /ɦ/; Eng: ahead	ṃ		a (Note: more central and less back than the closest English approximation)	ā		
velar		k /k/; Eng: skip	kh /kʰ/; Eng: cow	g /ɡ/; Eng: game	gh /ɡʱ/; Eng: doghouse	ṅ /ŋ/; Eng: ring					
palatal	ś /ɕ/; similar to Eng: ship	c /tɕ/; Eng: reach	ch /tɕʰ/; Eng: cheer	j /dʑ/; Eng: jeer	jh /dʑʱ/; Eng: sledgehammer	ñ /ɲ/; Fre: agneau, Spa: ñ, Rus: осень, Pol: jesień	y /j/; Eng: you	i	ī	ē	ai
retroflex	ṣ /ʂ/; Retroflex form of /ʃ/	ṭ /ʈ/; Ind Eng: stop	ṭh /ʈʰ/; Ind Eng: cathouse	ḍ /ɖ/; Ind Eng: door	ḍh /ɖʱ/; Ind Eng: adhere	ṇ /ɳ/; (NA/Irish/Scot) Eng: morning	r /r/; (NA/Irish/Scot) Eng: morning	ṛ /r̩/; (NA/Irish/Scot) Eng: int'r'sting diff'r'nce	ṝ		
dental	s /s/; Eng: same	t /t/; Fre, Spa: tomate	th /tʰ/; Eng: tip	d /d/; Fre: dans, Spa: donde	dh /dʱ/; Aspirated /d/	n /n/; Eng: name	l /l/; Fre, Spa: la	ḷ			
labial		p /p/; Eng: spin	ph /pʰ/; Eng: pork	b /b/; Eng: cab	bh /bʱ/; Eng: abhor	m /m/; Eng: mine	v /ʋ/; (Note: In the earlier language, v व was pronounced as the labio-velar approximant [w], but it later developed into a labio-dental sound. To an English speaker's ear, this sound may be interpreted as the English "v" or the English "w", depending on context and precise articulation. Moreover, the Sanskrit v व has a considerable range of articulation depending on position. It is nonetheless understood in the Sanskrit writing system, as well as perceived by speakers of modern Indian languages, as one and the same phoneme.)	u	ū	ō	au
	fric	unasp	asp	unasp	asp	nasal	semiv	short	long		
		stops						simple		diphth	
							vocalics				
	consonants							vowels			

It should be understood that, while the script commonly associated with Sanskrit is Devanagari, this has no particular importance. It just happens currently to be the most popular script for Sanskrit. The form of the symbols used to write Sanskrit has varied widely geographically and over time, and notably includes modern Indian scripts. What is important is that the adherence to the phonological classification of the symbols elucidated here has remained constant in Sanskrit since classical times. It should be further noted that the phonology of modern Indian languages has evolved, and the values given to Devanagari symbols in modern Indo-Aryan languages, e.g., Hindi, differ somewhat from those of Sanskrit.

=== Sound classes ===
==== Vowels & Semivowels ====
The long syllabic l (ḹ) is not attested, and is only discussed by grammarians for systematic reasons. Its short counterpart ḷ occurs in a single root only, kḷp . (Note: to order, array) Long syllabic r (ṝ) is also quite marginal, occurring (optionally) in the genitive plural of ṛ-stems (e.g. mātṛ, pitṛ ⇒ mātṝṇām, pitṝṇām).

i, u, ṛ, ḷ are vocalic allophones of consonantal y, v, r, l. There are thus only five invariably vocalic phonemes: a, ā, ī, ū, ṝ.

The Māhēśvara Sūtrāṇi

a i u·ṇ
ṛ ḷ·k
e o·ṅ
ai au·c
ha ya va ra·ṭ
la·ṇ
ña ma ṅa ṇa na·m
jʰa bʰa·ñ
gʰa ḍʰa dʰa·ṣ
ja ba ga ḍa da·ś
kʰa pʰa cʰa ṭʰa tʰa ca ṭa ta·v
ka pa·y
śa ṣa sa·r
ha·l

— Pāṇini, The Aṣṭādhyāyī

==== Visarga and anusvāra ====
Visarga ḥ ः is an allophone of r and s, and anusvara ṃ, Devanagari ं of any nasal, both in pausa (i.e., the nasalised vowel).

==== Sibilants ====
The exact pronunciation of the three sibilants may vary, but they are distinct phonemes. Voiced sibilants, such as z /z/, ẓ /ʐ/, and ź /ʑ/ as well as its aspirated counterpart źh /ʑʱ/, were inherited by Proto-Indo-Aryan from Proto-Indo-Iranian but lost around or after the time of the Rigveda, as evidenced due to ḷh (an aspirated retroflex lateral consonant) being metrically a cluster (that was most likely of the form ẓḍh; aspirated fricatives are exceedingly rare in any language).

==== Retroflex consonants ====
The retroflex consonants are somewhat marginal phonemes, often being conditioned by their phonetic environment; they do not continue a PIE series and are often ascribed by some linguists to the substratal influence of Dravidian, or spontaneous internal development from IE or other substrate languages. Loss of l from Fortunatov's law has made some free unconditioned retroflexes like PIE *bʰelsos > bhā́ṣā - bhāsa, PIE *poltos > paṭa - pati. Further solidified by Prakritic and non IA loans like Skr. *pṛthati > Pkt. paṭhati > Skt. paṭhati.

==== Nasals ====
The nasals [ɲ, ŋ] are mostly conditioned allophones of /n/. Phonologically independent /ŋ/ occurs only marginally, e.g. in prāṅ 'directed forwards/towards' [nom. sg. masc. of an adjective], a declension of prāñc. There are some onomatopoeic words with them like ña, ṅa, ṅu and declensions like ñuṅūṣate. /n/ and /ɳ/ are distinct phonemes (aṇu 'minute', 'atomic' [nom. sg. neutr. of an adjective] is distinctive from anu 'after', 'along').

=== Sandhi ===
Sanskrit deploys extensive phonological alternations on different linguistic levels through sandhi rules (literally, the rules of "putting together, union, connection, alliance"), similar to the English alteration of "going to" as gonna. The Sanskrit language accepts such alterations within it, but offers formal rules for the sandhi of any two words next to each other in the same sentence or linking two sentences. The external sandhi rules state that similar short vowels coalesce into a single long vowel, while dissimilar vowels form glides or undergo diphthongization. Among the consonants, most external sandhi rules recommend regressive assimilation for clarity when they are voiced. These rules ordinarily apply at compound seams and morpheme boundaries. In Vedic Sanskrit, the external sandhi rules are more variable than in Classical Sanskrit.

The internal sandhi rules are more intricate and account for the root and the canonical structure of the Sanskrit word. These rules anticipate what are now known as the Bartholomae's law and Grassmann's law. For example, states Jamison, the "voiceless, voiced, and voiced aspirated obstruents of a positional series regularly alternate with each other (p ≈ b ≈ bh; t ≈ d ≈ dh, etc.; note, however, c ≈ j ≈ h), such that, for example, a morpheme with an underlying voiced aspirate final may show alternants with all three stops under differing internal sandhi conditions". The velar series (k, g, gʰ) alternate with the palatal series (c, j, h), while the structural position of the palatal series is modified into a retroflex cluster when followed by dental. This rule creates two morphophonemically distinct series from a single palatal series.

=== Phonological processes ===
A number of phonological processes have been described in detail. One of them is abhinidhāna (lit. 'adjacent imposition'), (also known as āsthāpita, 'stoppage', bhakṣya or bhukta). It is the incomplete articulation, or ""repressing or obscuring", of a plosive or, according to some texts, a semi-vowel (except r), which occurs before another plosive or a pause. It was described in the various Prātiśākhyas as well as the Cārāyaṇīya Śikṣa. These texts are not unanimous on the environments that trigger abhinidhana, nor on the precise classes of consonants affected.

One ancient grammarian, Vyāḍi (in Ṛgveda Prātiśākhya 6.12), states that abhinidhāna only occurred when a consonant was doubled, whereas according to the text of the Śākalas it was obligatory in this context but optional for plosives before another plosive of a different place of articulation. The Śākalas and the Atharva Veda Prātiśākhya agree on the observation that abhinidhana occurs only if there is a slight pause between the two consonants and not if they are pronounced jointly. Word-finally, plosives undergo abhinidhāna according to the Atharva Veda Prātiśākhya and the Ṛgveda Prātiśākhya. The latter text adds that final semivowels (excluding r) are also incompletely articulated. The Atharva Veda Prātiśākhya 2.38 lists an exception: a plosive at the end of the word will not undergo abhinidhāna and will be fully released if it is followed by a consonant whose place of articulation is further back in the mouth. The Cārāyaṇīya Śikṣa states that the consonants affected by abhinidhāna are the voiceless unaspirated plosives, the nasal consonants and the semivowels l and v. (Note: These differences may indicate geographical variation. It is not clear whether abhinidhana was present in the early spoken Sanskrit or it developed at a later stage. In Prakrit and Pāli abhinidhana was carried a step forward into complete assimilation, as for example Sanskrit: sapta to Jain Prakrit: satta.)

== Morphophonology ==
=== Vowel gradation ===
Sanskrit inherits from Proto-Indo-European the feature of regular in-word, vowel variations known in the context of the parent language as ablaut or more generally apophony.

This feature, which can be seen in the English forms sing, sang, sung, and song, themselves a direct continuation of the PIE ablaut, is fundamental (Note: The very first of the sūtras in Pāṇini's Aṣṭādhyāyī define vowel gradation!) in Sanskrit both for inflexion and derivation.

Vowels within stems may change to other related vowels on the basis of the morphological operation being performed on it. There are three such grades, named the zero grade, first grade, and second grade. The first and second grades are also termed guṇa (Note: "ad·eṄ guṇaḥ" – Pāṇini I 2) and vṛddhi (Note: "vṛddhir·ād·aiC" – Pāṇini I 1) respectively. The full pattern of gradation, followed by example usage:

Vowel gradation
	Zero grade	1st grade	2nd grade
Open	∅	a	ā
Palatal	i/ī y i/ī	e (Note: originally 'ai') ay ya	ai (Note: originally 'āi') āy yā
Labial	u/ū v u/ū	o (Note: originally 'au') av va	au (Note: originally 'āu') āv vā
Retroflex	ṛ r ṛ	ar ar ra	ār ār rā
Dental	ḷ	al	āl

Vowel gradation examples
	Zero grade	1st grade	2nd grade
Open	rā́jñ·as	rā́jan	rā́jān·am
Palatal	ji·tá- niny·ús iṣ·ṭá-	jé·tum náy·ana- yáj·ana-	á·jai·ṣ·am nā́y·aya·ti yā́j·aya·ti
Labial	śru·tá- śṛṇv·é ud·i·tá-	śró·tum śráv·aṇa- vád·ana-	á·śrau·ṣ·am śuśrā́v·a vā́d·aya·ti
Retroflex	kṛ·tá- cakr·ús gṛhī·tá	kár·tum kár·aṇa- gráh·aṇa-	ca·kā́r·a kā́r·aya·ti grā́h·aya·ti
Dental	kḷp·tá-	kálp·ana-	kā́lpa-

As per the internal and historical structure of the system, the guṇa grade can be seen as the normal grade, whence proceeds either a strengthening (Note: vṛddhi indeed means growth) to form the second grade, or a weakening to form the zero-grade. The ancient grammarians however took the zero-grade as the natural form on which to apply guṇa or vṛddhi.

Whilst with the 1-grade-based system it is possible to derive the 0-grades thus:

- ghóṣ·a·ti ⇒ ghuṣ·ṭá-
- sráv·a·ti ⇒ sru·tá-
- sváp·a·ti (Note: or svapiti) ⇒ sup·tá-

the approach used by the ancient grammarians does not always work:

- sup·tá- ≠ *sóp·a·ti

To overcome this, the ancient grammarians, while formulating most roots in zero-grade form, make an exception for some, and prescribe a treatment called samprasāraṇa on these:

- ghóṣ·a·ti, ghuṣ·ṭá- ⇒ ghuṣ-
- sráv·a·ti, sru·tá- ⇒ sru-
- sváp·a·ti, sup·tá- ⇒ svap-

Thus, unlike most others, the root 'svap-' does not hold a 0-grade vowel, and is subject to samprasāraṇa before the past participle 'sup·tá-' can be formed.

Besides *r̥, *l̥, Proto-Indo-European also had *m̥, *n̥, (Note: See Proto-Indo-European phonology#Sonorants) all of which, in capacity of zero-grade vowels, participated in the gradation system. Whilst the latter two did not survive in Sanskrit (they ended up as a instead), their effects can be seen in verb-formation steps such as just seen above.

Therefore, it is possible to analogically expand the above vowel-gradation table thus:

Vowel gradation
	Zero grade	1st grade	2nd grade
Labial nasal	a ga·tá-	am gám·ana	ām jagā́ma
Dental nasal	a ha·tá-	an hán·ti	ān jaghā́na

The proto-forms of ga·tá- and ha·tá- would thus have *m̥ and *n̥ respectively: *gʷm̥·tó- (Note: gʷm̥tó-) and *gʷʰn̥·tó- (Note: *gʷʰn̥-tó-)

=== Accent ===
Sanskrit inherited a pitch accent (see: Vedic accent) from Proto-Indo-European, as well as vowel gradation, both of which, in Sanskrit, just as in the parent language, go hand in hand.

As a general rule, a root bearing the accent takes the first (guṇa) or second (vṛddhi) grade, and when unaccented, reduces to zero grade.

- i- ⇒ éti (0 ⇒ 1st grade)
- i·tá ⇒ áy·anam (0 ⇒ 2nd grade)

The gradation examples given in the previous sections demonstrate several more instances of this phenomenon with verbs.

With nouns, the pattern does not always hold, as even from the earliest stage of the language, there has been a tendency to fix a single form, thus while kṣam has kṣā́mas (2-g) and kṣmás (0-g), vāc has 2nd-grade forms throughout.

Nouns whose stem vary between strong, middle and weak forms may correspondingly reflect 2nd, 1st and zero-grade vowels respectively. This may not always be matched by the accent:

- rā́jan, rā́jānam, rā́jnā (1, 2, 0 grades)

The above system of accent disappeared completely at some point during the classical stage. It was still alive in Pāṇini's time and even after Patañjali. (Note: Śāntanava discusses this in his Phiṭsūtra.) The author of the Kāśikā commentary (c. 700 CE) declares its use optional, and it might have disappeared from popular speech in the early centuries of the Common Era.

== Verbs ==
=== Background ===
Sanskrit has inherited from its parent the Proto-Indo-European language an elaborate system of verbal morphology, more of which has been preserved in Sanskrit as a whole than in other kindred languages such as Ancient Greek or Latin.

Some of the features of the verbal system, however, have been lost in the classical language, compared to the older Vedic Sanskrit, and in other cases, distinctions that have existed between different tenses have been blurred in the later language. Classical Sanskrit thus does not have the subjunctive or the injunctive mood, has dropped a variety of infinitive forms, and the distinctions in meaning between the imperfect, perfect and aorist forms are barely maintained and ultimately lost.

=== Conjugation ===
Verb conjugation in Sanskrit involves the interplay of five 'dimensions', number (Note: vacana), person (Note: puruṣa), voice (Note: prayoga), mood (Note: artha) and tense (Note: kāla), with the following variables:

1	3 numbers	singular (Note: eka·vacana), dual (Note: dvi·vacana), plural (Note: bahu·vacana)
2	3 persons	first (Note: uttama·puruṣa), second (Note: madhyama·puruṣa), third (Note: prathama·puruṣa)
3	3 voices	active (Note: kartari·prayoga), middle (Note: karmaṇi·prayoga), passive (Note: bhāve·prayoga)
4	4 moods	indicative, optative, imperative, conditional
5	6 tenses	present, imperfect, perfect, aorist, periphrastic future, simple future

Further, participles are considered part of the verbal systems although they are not verbs themselves. Classical Sanskrit has only one infinitive, of accusative case-form.

=== Formation ===
The starting point for the morphological analysis of the Sanskrit verb is the root. Before the final endings to denote number, person etc can be applied, additional elements may be added to the root. Whether such elements are affixed or not, the resulting component here is the stem, to which these final endings can then be added.

Based on the treatment they undergo to form the stem, the roots of the Sanskrit language are arranged by the ancient grammarians in ten classes (Note: gaṇas), based on how they form the present stem, and named after a verb typical to each class.

No discoverable grammatical principle has been found for the ordering of these classes. This can be rearranged for greater clarity into non-thematic and thematic groups as summarized below:

Thematic verb classes
Root		Treatment	Stem	gaṇa	Conjugation samples (Note: Present-tense third-person singular)	Remarks
√bhū-		Root accent, gunated (Note: Occasionally vriddhied)	bháv-	First	bháv·a·ti	The commonest of all classes, with nearly half of the roots in the language.
√tud-	(Note: strike)	None (ending accent)	tud-	Sixth	tud·á·ti	
√dív-	(Note: cast, throw, especially of dice)	-ya- suffix	dī́v·ya-	Fourth	dī́v·ya·ti	
√cur-	(Note: steal)	-aya- with root gradation, or -áya- without	cór·aya-	Tenth	cór·aya·ti	Usually to form causatives, not strictly a class per se

Athematic verb classes
Root		Treatment	Stem	gaṇa	Conjugation samples (Note: Present-tense third-person singular, dual and plural)	Remarks
√ad-	(Note: eat)	None	ad-	Second	at·ti at·tas ad·anti	
√hu-	(Note: call, invoke, sacrifice)	Reduplication, accent varies	juhó- juhu- júhv- (Note: variant of the u- form when followed by a vowel)	Third	juhó·ti juhu·tás júhv·ati	
√su-	(Note: press (of juice))	-no- suffix	su·nó- su·nu- su·nv-	Fifth	su·nó·ti su·nu·tás su·nv·ánti	
√tan-	(Note: extend, spread)	-o- suffix	tan·ó- tan·u- tan·v-	Eighth (Note: Very similar to the Fifth class)	tan·ó·ti tan·u·tás tan·v·ánti	
√krī-	(Note: buy)	-nā- suffix	krī·ṇā́- krī·ṇī- krī·ṇ-	Ninth	krī·ṇā́·ti krī·ṇī·tás krī·ṇ-ánti	
√rudh-	(Note: stop, arrest, check)	Nasal infix	ru·ṇá·dh- ru·n·dh-	Seventh	ru·ṇá·d·dhi ru·n·d·dhás ru·n·dh·ánti	

=== Scope ===
As in kindred Indo-European languages, conjugation is effected across the tenses, moods, voices, persons and numbers stated, yielding, in Sanskrit, a huge number of combinations.

Conjugation – standard finite verbs
System	Tense	Mood	Endings	Conventional term
Present	Present	Indicative	Primary	'Present'
Present	Present	Optative	Secondary	'Optative'
Present	Present	Imperative	Imperative	'Imperative'
Present	Past	Indicative	Secondary	'Imperfect'
Perfect	Past	Indicative	Perfect	'Perfect'
Aorist	Pefect	Indicative	Secondary	'Aorist'
Aorist	Pefect	Optative (Note: Very rare in Classical Sanskrit)	Secondary	'Precative'
Future	Future (Note: 2 forms: Simple & Periphrastic)	Indicative	Primary	'Future'
Future	Perfect	Conditional	Secondary	'Conditional'

Furthermore, Sanskrit has so-called Secondary conjugations:

- Passive
- Intensive
- Desiderative
- Causative
- Denominative

The non-finite forms are:

- Participles (Note: may take both active and middle voice)
- Infinitive
- Gerund

== Nominals ==
=== Declension ===
Declension of a noun in Sanskrit involves the interplay of two 'dimensions': 3 numbers and 8 cases. Further, nouns themselves in Sanskrit, like its parent Proto-Indo-European, can be in one of three genders.

In addition, adjectives behave much the same way morphologically as nouns do, and can conveniently be considered together. While the same noun cannot be seen to be of more than one gender, adjectives change gender on the basis of the noun they are being applied to, along with case and number, thus giving the following variables:

1	3 numbers	singular, dual, plural
2	3 genders	masculine, feminine, neuter
3	8 cases	nominative, accusative, instrumental, dative, ablative, genitive, locative, vocative

The oldest system of declension was in Proto-Indo-European, inherited by Sanskrit, to affix the endings directly to the nominal root. In later stages, a new system developed wherein an intermediary called the thematic vowel is inserted to the root before the final endings are appended: *-o- which in Sanskrit becomes -a-, producing the thematic stem.

=== Stem classification ===
Substantives may be divided into different classes on the basis of the stem vowel before they are declined on the above basis. The general classification is:

- a-stems
- i- and u-stems
- ā-, ī- and ū-stems
- ṛ-stems
- Consonant stems

When the nominal endings are being affixed to a noun of each class, they may undergo, in some cases, some changes, including being entirely replaced by other forms.

=== Personal pronouns and determiners ===
Sanskrit pronouns and determiners behave in their declension largely like other declinable classes such as nouns, adjectives and numerals, so that they can all be classed together under nominals. However, pronouns and determiners display certain peculiarities of their own compared to the other nominal classes.

Furthermore, personal pronouns have an additional dimension not present in the other nominals, but shared by verbs: person.

Pronouns (Note: sarva·nāman) are declined for case (Note: vibhakti), number (Note: vacana), and gender (Note: liṅga). The pronominal declension applies to a few adjectives as well. Many pronouns have alternative enclitic forms.

== Derivation ==
Derivation or word-formation in Sanskrit can be divided into the following types:

1. Primary derivation – suffixes directly appended to roots (Note: kṛt)
2. Secondary derivation – suffixes appended to derivative stems (Note: taddhita)
3. Word-compounding – combining one more word stems

=== Compounds ===
Sanskrit inherits from its parent Proto-Indo-European the capability of forming compound nouns (Note: samāsa), also widely seen in kindred languages such as especially German, Greek and also English.

However, Sanskrit, especially in the later stages of the language, significantly expands on this both in terms of the number of elements making up a single compound and the volume of compound-usage in the literature, a development which has no parallels elsewhere.

== Indeclinables ==
Words that change no form across cases, numbers, genders are classified as indeclinables (Note: avyaya). Indeclinables may be divided into either simple and compound. The latter is treated under Sanskrit compounds and the term indeclinable usually implies only the former type.

Indeclinables can be classified as follows:

1. Prepositions
2. Adverbs
3. Particles
4. Conjunctions
5. Interjections
6. Miscellaneous

=== Prepositions ===
In Sanskrit, a preposition (Note: upasarga or gāti) is an indeclinable with an independent meaning that is prefixed to verbs and their derivatives with the result of modifying, intensifying, or in some cases, totally altering the sense of the roots.

=== Adverbs ===
In Sanskrit, adverbs are either inherited as set forms from the parent language or may be derived from nouns, pronouns or numeral.

The typical way of forming an adverb is to simply use the accusative singular neutral form (Note: occasionally other singular cases are used) of nouns and adjectives.

=== Particles ===
Particles are used either as expletives or intensives.

The most common ones are:

1. a-, an- – generally the same meaning as English 'un-' and 'a-', but with some extended senses
2. sma – when used with the present form of a verb, it conveys the past tense
3. kā-, ku- – prefixed to give a negative, inadequate or pejorative connotation.

=== Conjunctions ===
The following is an enumeration of the main types of Sanskrit conjunctions:

1. atha – marks the beginning of a work
2. Copulative – atha, atho, uta, ca, etc
3. Disjunctive – vā, vā... vā, etc
4. Adversative – athavā, tu, kintu, etc
5. Conditional – cet, yadi, yadāpi, net, etc
6. Causal – hi, tat, tena, etc
7. Interrogative – āho, āha, uta, utāho, kim, etc
8. Affirmative and negative – atha kim, ām, addhā, etc
9. Conjunctions of time – yāvat-tāvat, yadā-tadā, etc
10. iti – marks the end of a work

=== Interjections ===
The main ones in Sanskrit expressing the various emotions are:

1. Wonder, grief, regret, etc: ā, aho, ha, etc
2. Contempt: kim, dhik, etc
3. Sorrow, dejection, grief: hā, hāhā, hanta, etc
4. Joy: hanta etc
5. Respectfully calling attention: aho, bhoḥ, he, ho, etc
6. Disrespectfully calling attention: are, rere, etc

=== Miscellaneous ===
A few nouns have only one inflection and thus behave like indeclinables. The most common ones are:

- anyat (Note: another (reason))
- asti (Note: that exists)
- nāsti (Note: non-existence)
- saṃvat (Note: year)
- bhūr (Note: earth)
- bhuvar (Note: sky)
- svāhā (Note: food offered to the gods)
- namas (Note: a bow)
- svasti (Note: well-being, happiness)
- om

== Syntax ==
Because of Sanskrit's complex declension system, the word order is free. In usage, there is a strong tendency toward subject–object–verb (SOV), which was the original system in place in Vedic prose. However, there are exceptions when word pairs cannot be transposed.

Notably, Pāṇini did not fix syntax in the Aṣtādhyāyī, as to do so explicitly would be difficult in any language, given several ways of expressing the same idea and various other ways of expressing similar ideas. Thus within the bounds of phonological and morphological definition wrought by Pāṇini, the syntax of Sanskrit has continued to evolve in the course of its productive literary history.

== Peculiar characteristics ==
In the introduction to his celebrated translation of Vidyakara's Subhāṣitaratnakośa, Daniel H.H. Ingalls describes some peculiar characteristics of the Sanskrit language.

He refers to the enormous vocabulary of Sanskrit, and also of the presence of a larger choice of synonyms in Sanskrit than any other language he knew of. Further, just as there exist a vast number of synonyms for almost any word in Sanskrit, there also exist synonymous constructions. In his elementary Sanskrit examinations he would ask his students to write in Sanskrit the sentence 'You must fetch the horse' in ten different ways. Actually, it is possible to write the sentence in Sanskrit in around fifteen different ways 'by using active or passive constructions, imperative or optative, an auxiliary verb, or any of the three gerundive forms, each of which, by the way, gives a different metrical pattern'.

Ingalls writes: 'Every Indian, one may suppose, grew up learning naturally the language of his mother and his playmates. Only after this, and if he belonged to the priesthood or the nobility or to such a professional caste as that of the clerks, the physicians, or the astrologers, would he learn Sanskrit. As a general rule, Sanskrit was not the language of the family. It furnished no subconscious symbols for the impressions which we receive in childhood nor for the emotions which form our character in early adolescence.'

== See also ==
- Sanskrit nominals
- Sanskrit verbs
- Sanskrit compound
- Pāṇini
- Aṣṭādhyāyī
- Vedic Sanskrit grammar
- Pierre-Sylvain Filliozat, French Sanskrit scholar
- Proto-Indo-Aryan
- Proto-Indo-Iranian
- Proto-Indo-European

== Bibliography ==
- Fortson, Benjamin W (2010). Indo-European Language and Culture (2010 ed.). Wiley-Blackwell. ISBN 978-1-4051-8895-1.
- Burrow, Thomas (2001). The Sanskrit Language (2001 ed.). Motilal Banarsidass. ISBN 81-208-1767-2.
- Whitney, William Dwight (January 2008). Sanskrit Grammar (2000 ed.). Motilal Banarsidass. ISBN 978-81-208-0620-7.
- Coulson, Michael (2003). Sanskrit (2003 ed.). McGraw Hill. ISBN 0-340-85990-3.
- Bucknell, Roderick S (January 2010). Sanskrit Grammar (2000 ed.). Motilal Banarsidass. ISBN 978-81-208-1188-1.
- Kale, M R (1969). A Higher Sanskrit Grammar (2002 ed.). Motilal Banarsidass. ISBN 81-208-0177-6.
- Cardona, George (1997). Pāṇini - His work and his traditions. Motilal Banarsidass. ISBN 81-208-0419-8.
- Keith, A. Berriedale (1956). A History of Sanskrit Literature. Great Britain: Oxford University Press.
- Böhtlingk, Otto, Pâṇini's Grammatik, Leipzig (1887)
- Allen, W.S. (1953), Phonetics in ancient India, OUP
- B. Delbrück, Altindische Tempuslehre (1876) Topics in Sanskrit morphology and syntax
- Staal, Frits, Word order in Sanskrit and Universal Grammar, Foundations of Language, supplementary series 5, Springer (1967), ISBN 978-90-277-0549-5.
- Staal, Frits (1972). A Reader on the Sanskrit Grammarians. MIT Press. ISBN 0-262-19078-8.
- Varma, Siddheshwar (1961) [1927]. Critical studies in the phonetic observations of Indian grammarians. James G. Forlong Fund. Delhi: Munshi Ram Manohar Lal.
- Wackernagel, Debrunner, Altindische Grammatik, Göttingen.
  - vol. I. phonology Jacob Wackernagel (1896)
  - vol. II.1. introduction to morphology, nominal composition, Wackernagel (1905)
  - vol. II.2. nominal suffixes, J. Wackernagel and Albert Debrunner (1954)
  - vol. III. nominal inflection, numerals, pronouns, Wackernagel and Debrunner (1930)
- Stiehl, Ulrich (2011). Sanskrit-Kompendium : ein Lehr-, Übungs- und Nachschlagewerk; Devanagari-Ausgabe (PDF) (in German). Heidelberg: Forkel. ISBN 978-3-7719-0086-1.
- Jamison, Stephanie (2008). Roger D. Woodard (ed.). The Ancient Languages of Asia and the Americas. Cambridge University Press. ISBN 978-0-521-68494-1. Archived from the original on 29 March 2024.
