= Wackernagel =

Wackernagel is a surname. Notable people with the surname include:

- Barbara Wackernagel-Jacobs (born 1950), a German politician
- Christof Wackernagel (born 1951), German actor and author, terrorist of the RAF
- Elisabeth Wackernagel (born 1947), a German politician (CDU)
- Katharina Wackernagel (born 1978), a German actress
- Lars Wackernagel (born 1975), German cyclist
- Martin Wackernagel (1881 - 1962), a Swiss art historian
- Mathis Wackernagel (born 1962), a Swiss-born sustainability advocate
- Philipp Wackernagel (1800 - 1877), hymnologist
- (Karl Heinrich) Wilhelm Wackernagel (1806, Berlin - 1869), a German-Swiss philologist, Germanist, father of Jacob
  - Jacob (Jakob) Wackernagel (1853 - 1938), a Swiss Indo-Europeanist and scholar of Sanskrit
    - Wackernagel's Law, named after Jacob
