= Bellamkonda Ramaraya Kavindrulu =

Indian poet, scholar, philosopher (1875–1914)

- Bellamkonda Rama Rao or Bellamkonda Ramaraya Kavi
- Born: 27 December 1875; Pamidi Padu, Narasaraopet Guntur, Andhra Pradesh, India
- Died: 27 October 1914 (aged 38)
- Education: Home schooling in Sanskrit and Telugu in Pamidipadu
- Occupations: Gurukul Teacher at home, taught students Sanskrit & Telugu, Philosopher, Poet, & Writer
- Writing career
- Years active: 1875-1914
- Notable works: Sariraka-catussutri-vicara, Rukminiparinaya, Vedantasangrah, SankarasankaraBhasya Vimarsanam, etc. in Sanskrit

Bellamkonda Ramaraya Kavindrulu (also known as Rama Rao) (1875–1914) was an Indian poet, author, yogi, Sanskrit scholar and a philosopher.

Ramaraya Kavi wrote nearly 148 classic works in Sanskrit . All but 45 are missing. While some are available in part, the remaining are available full length.

Sanskrit scholars view Ramaraya Kavi as a strong proponent of Advaita siddhanta (theory) of Adi Shankara. His philosophical interpretations and dialectics of logical disputation of Advaita system of thought earned him the name Apara Adi Shankara which means—Ramaraya Kavi is another incarnation of Adi Shankara.

Ramaraya Kavi was a Yogi from a very young age following his inititiation into spirituality by Lord Hayagreeva, as claimed by his first disciple Lanka Sundararama Sastri.

== Early life and education ==
Ramaraya Kavi's earlier name was Rama Rao. He was born to Bellamkonda Mohan Rao and Hanumamba on 27 December 1875, in Pamidipadu in Andhra Pradesh. Though they were 6000 Niyogi Brahmins, they paradoxically embraced the Vaishnava tradition headed by Sri Ramanuja Acharya.. As such, Rama Rao's family was also deeply religious and devoted to Lord Vishnu and pursuing Vishishtadvaita.

Rama Rao lost his father at the age of 7 years. He had homeschooling and could not pursue higher education due to poor health. Sankaramanchi Lakshminarayana Sastri and Sankaramanchi Seetaramaiah taught him the Upanishads, Namaka Chamakam or Sri Rudra Chamakam, Vedas, etc.

Rama Rao later continued his studies in Mahabhashyam, Vyakaranam (Grammar), and Tarkam (logic) under Purighatla Rama Sastri, Bhagavatula Hari Sastri and Purighatla Subrahmanya Sastri. He learnt Manorama, Sabdendu Sekharamu, Patanjali Bhashyam, etc. under Purighatla Rama Sastri. Initially, Rama Rao learnt up to Siddhanta Kaumudi to Sandhi Panchakam under Purighatla Rama Sastri. Based on this simple instruction, he ventured into writing a simplified commentary on Siddhanta Kaumudi entitled as Saradratri, and Kuvalayanandamu.

His biographer and first disciple Lanka Sundararama Sastri had written that Rama Rao was initiated into spirituality at the age of 14. As a consequence of his initiation into spiritual realm, Rama Rao has changed his name from 'Rao' to 'Raya'. Subsequently, in praise of the Lord Hayagreeva, he has written Srimad Hayavadana Satakam, Hayagreeva Ashtottara Satanamavali, Sri Hayagreeva Sahasranamavali, Hayagreeva Navaratnastuti which are said to be rare and very difficult compositions in Sanskrit. Perhaps that is the reason, scholars argued, why Ramaraya Kavi himself had given commentaries to these poetic works.

== Refuting Visishtadvaita ==
Ramaraya Kavi's contribution to Advaita Siddhanta, refuting Visishtadvaita, is said to be central to the Indian Vedic literature and spirituality. Though Ramaraya Kavi's family embraced the Vaishnava tradition, his studies of Sri Bhashyam of Ramanuja and the commentary of Adi Shankara on the Bhagavad Gita led him to believe in the existence of gaping holes in the dialectics of Vishistadviata.

Ever since he turned into a complete Smarta by adopting Advaita of Adi Shankara. He did not stop there. In his commentaries on Advaita, especially in his work Sankaraasankara Bhasya Vimarsaha, he has tried to prove ten most important interpretations of Ramanuja's Sri Bhashyam as false. Similar efforts of condemning Visishtadvaita continued in his later works such as Siddhanta Sindhuhu. and Vendanta Sangrahaha.

== Uniqueness of Ramaraya Kavi's Literature ==
According to Professor R.Balasubramanian and Revathy, Ramaraya Kavi's Vedanta-Sangraha is one of the fundamental and important texts on Advaita philosophy. It describes the basic theories and concepts of Vedanta. The interpretation and explanation of the text give us an insight into concepts like -Tat-tvam-Asi- of Advaita. It is also significant to note that Ramaraya Kavi has explained in detail the different technical terminologies of Vedanta used by the philosophers of that period, while establishing his own doctrines. They further added that Ramaraya Kavi belongs to the group of illustrious commentators on the basic texts and commentaries on Advaita Vedanta.

Professor K.S.R.Datta has written in his article Ramaraya Kavi: A Modern Literary Giant published in Bhavan’s Journal in 1977 :

He was not only an original writer but also a commentator par excellence. His writings are marked by easy style, clarity of expression and vigour. His contributions to Advaita in particular and Sanskrit in general is immeasurable but this is not recognized by the scholars due to non-availability of his works, many of which were unfortunately lost or unpublished.

Mellacheruvu Subrahmanya Saastri who rendered a number of Bellamkonda Ramaraya Kavi's works into Telugu has opined in his introduction to these books that Ramaraya Kavi is a poet whose depth of knowledge appears to be equal to a repository of millions of books. His ability to quickly grasp any given literary nuance of a spiritual text by offering new evidences and interpretations to the earlier texts is beyond anybody's imagination. Subrahmanya Saastri has not only extensively studied the works of Bellamkonda Ramaraya Kavi but also has written commentaries on Paramatma Sahasranamavali, Dasasloki, SankarasankaraBhasya Vimarsanam, Advaita Vijayamu, of Bellamkonda Ramaraya Kavi.

Professor C S H N Murthy has published a vivid biography of Sri Bellamkonda Ramaraya Kavi in English in the bi-monthly Journal of Indian Literature, Kendriya Sahitya Akademy (Central Sahitya Akademy), New Delhi in Vol.316, (pp. 153–167), 2020.

== Death ==
Ramaraya Kavi died following a brief illness in 1914 at the age of 39.

The Bellamkonda Ramaraya Kavindrulu Trust in Narsaraopet has published a number of Ramaraya Kavi's works in Telugu and Sanskrit and placed them in Google..
