= Kaumudi =

Kaumudi (Sanskrit: kaumudī "enlightenment, illumination, explanatory commentary") may refer to:

- Vijñānakaumudī, work by Ananda Bhatta
- Siddhāntakaumudī, work by Bhaṭṭoji Dīkṣita
- Kaumudī Mahotsava, work by an unknown Indian poet (circa 3rd century CE)
- Sambad Kaumudi, Bengali newspaper in colonial India (1819–1836)
- Kerala Kaumudi, Malayalam newspaper published in India
- Kaumudi (magazine), Gujarati language literary magazine formerly punlsihed in India (1924–1937)
- Kaumudi Munshi, Indian classical musician (1929–2020)
- Kaumudi Teacher, Indian freedom fighter (1917–2009)
