= James R. Ballantyne =

James Robert Ballantyne (1813–1864) was a Scottish Orientalist. From 1832 to 1845 he was a master at the Scottish Naval and Military Academy in Edinburgh, teaching Persian Hindi and Arabic to prospective officers of the East India Company. From 1845 he was superintendent of the Sanskrit College (Benares) in Varanasi (then known as Benares). He went to England in 1861 where he was elected librarian of the India Office.

Ballantyne published grammars of Sanskrit, Hindi (2nd edition, 1868), and Marathi, and published an edition of the Laghukaumudi of Varadarāja 1849-52 and the first part of the Mahabhashya of Patanjali in 1856, for the first time opening native Indian grammatical tradition to a wider European scholarly audience.

== Works ==
- Hindustani Grammar and Exercises, 1838
- Mahratta Grammar, 1839
- Elements of Hindu and Braj-Bhaka Grammar, 1839
- Hindustani Selections, 1840
- Pocket Guide to Hindustani Conversation, 4th ed. 1841
- Persian Calligraphy, 2 ed. 1842
- Practical Oriental Interpreter, 1843
- Catechism of Sanskrit Grammar, 2 ed. 1845
- A Synopsis of Science from the Stand-point of the Nyáya Philosophy, 1852
- Christianity Contrasted with Indian Philosophy, 1859
- First Lessons in Sanskrit Grammar, 3 ed. 1862
- The Sankhya Aphorisms of Kapila, 1885
