= Varadarāja =

17th-century Sanskrit grammarian

Varadarāja was a 17th-century Hindu Sanskrit grammarian. He compiled an abridgement of the work of his master, the Siddhānta Kaumudī of Bhaṭṭoji Dīkṣita, in three versions, referred to as madhya "middle", laghu "short" and sāra "substance, quintessence" versions of the Siddhāntakaumudī, the latter reducing the number of rules to 723 (out of the full 3,959 of Pāṇini). These are comparatively accessible introductions to the very technical grammar of Pāṇini himself, and the 1849 translation by Ballantyne was important to the understanding of native Indian grammatical tradition in Western scholarship (Pāṇini's grammar was first translated by Otto von Böhtlingk in 1887).

== Bibliography ==
- Maṅgala Dharmakīrtti Śrī Anavamadarśī, Laghu Siddhānta Kaumudi (included in Pāṇini Grammar): Sanskrit by Pandit Varadaraja with Tatwadipika. A Sinhalese Commentary, Colombo: M.J. Rodrigo Vidane Mohandiram (1926)
- Jñānavimala Tiṣya, Pāṇini Sanskrit Grammar: Maddhya Siddhanta Kaumudi, Panadure: M.H. Salgado 1928.
- G. V. Devasthali, Sārasiddhāntakaumudī of Varadarāja, University of Poona (1968), review: Rosane Rocher, Journal of the American Oriental Society (1970)
- James R. Ballantyne, Laghukaumudi of Varadaraja (1849–52); 2001 reprint: ISBN 81-208-0916-5
- Miroj Shakya, University of the West, Nagarjuna Institute of Buddhist Studies, http://www.dsbcproject.org/canon-text/content/881/3011
