= Padmanabhadatta =

14th-century Sanskrit grammarian

Padmanabhadatta was a Sanskrit grammarian. He is a successor to the grammarian Pāṇini and the author of the Supadmavyākaraṇa, a Sanskrit grammar text. He is considered the founder of the Supadma School.

== Life ==
Padmanabhadatta was born in a Brahmin dynasty of Mithila in the 14th century. His father's name was Damodaradatta. Their lineage begins with Vararuchi, who was the king poet of Kalidas along with Vikramaditya. In the year 1427, Padmanabhadatta introduced his lineage in his book Prishodaradivritti. Hara Prasad Shastri has written that Padmanabhadatta was a resident of Bhorgram which was situated a few miles from Darbhanga.

== Works ==
Padmanabhadatta composed the Supadmavyākaraṇa around 1375 A.D. The Supadmavyākaraṇa is written in the Bengali alphabet, making it accessible to the Bengal provinces by removing the complexity of Sanskrit grammar. The text is based on Pāṇini's Ashtadhyayi, but remodeled and rearranged with explanatory notes. Padmanabhadatta's main objective was to make knowledge of Sanskrit grammar clear and simple and to Sanskritize the new words that developed in the language. The work became most popular in Vangala.

Due to the simplicity and importance of Supadmavyākaraṇa, several commentaries were written on it. Padmanabhadatta himself wrote a commentary on his grammar named Panjika. Apart from these, commentaries have been written by Vishnu Mishra, Ramchandra, Sridharchakravarti and Kasishvara on Supadma Vyakarana.

Another work by Padmanabhadatta is a lexicon of synonymous and homonymous words called Bhüriprayoga. The work is divided into three parts, the homonyms part being bigger than the synonyms. It was later cited in Amarasimha's thesaurus Amarakosha.

Other works, as stated in his Prishodradivritti, include Unadivritti (a collection of aphorisms on word formation derived by means of unddi suffxes), Prayogadipika, Dhatakaumudi, Yelugadivrutti, Definitionvritti and others.
