= Je with stroke =

Cyrillic letter

- Ј̵ ј̵

Usage
- Writing system: Cyrillic
- Type: Alphabetic
- Sound values: [j̃]

Je with stroke (Ј̵ ј̵; italics: Ј̵ ј̵) is a grapheme of the Cyrillic script used by Otto von Böhtlingk in the Yakut language in the 19th century. Il is composed of the letter je ⟨Ј, ј⟩ with a bar inserted in the middle. It is not to be confused with the Latin letter J with stroke ⟨Ɉ, ɉ⟩.

== Uses ==
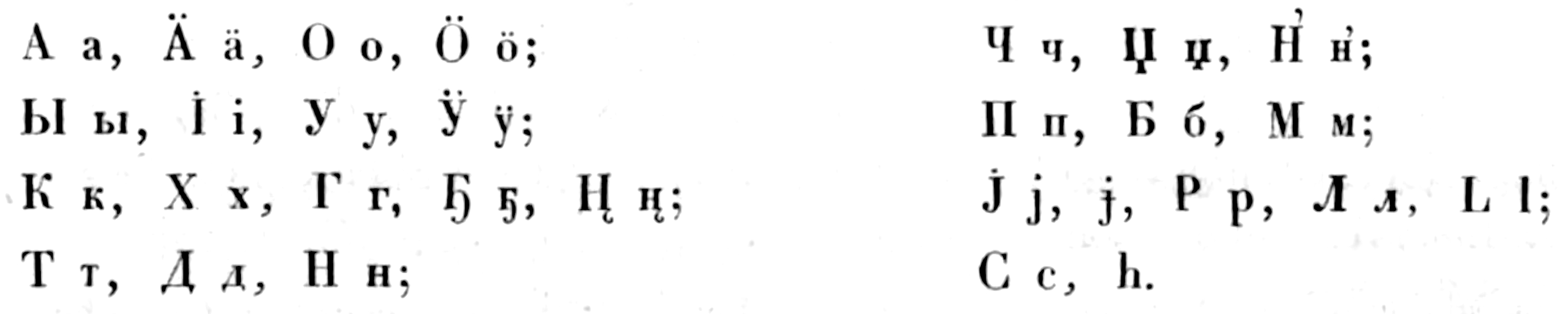
The Yakut alphabet of von Böhtlingk, published in 1851.

Je with stroke was used in Yakut in the orthography of Otto von Böhtlingk in 1851. It represents the nasalized voiced palatal approximant [j̃].

== Computing codes ==
Je with stroke cannot be represented with a precomposed Unicode character.

The use of characters for the Cyrillic letter Je with a Combining Short Stroke Overlay U+0335 was proposed: ⟨Ј̵ ј̵⟩; however these combinations are not guaranteed to display correctly.

The correct characters for je with stroke can be found in the encoding ISO 10754:

- capital Ј̵: 15
- lowercase ј̵: 14

== See also ==
- Acute accent
- Cyrillic script
- Ј ј - Cyrillic letter Je

== Bibliography ==
- Aliprand, Joan (2002). Status of Mapping between Characters of ISO 10574 and ISO/IEC 10646-1 (PDF).
- Library of Congress; American Library Association (2017). "Non-Slavic Languages (in Cyrillic Script)" (PDF). ALA-LC Romanization Tables.
- von Böhtlingk, Otto (1851a). Über die Sprache der Jakuten (in German). Vol. 1. St. Petersburg: Buchdr. der K. Akademie der Wissenschaften.
- von Böhtlingk, Otto (1851b). Über die Sprache der Jakuten (in German). Vol. 2. St. Petersburg: Buchdr. der K. Akademie der Wissenschaften.
