= Shastradipika =

The Shastradipika (Sanskrit: शास्त्रदीपिका; IAST: Śāstradīpikā) is an essay (nibandha) written by Pārthasārathi Miśra in the 11th century on the Purva Mimamsa Sutras, based on Vārtikas of Kumārila Bhaṭṭa.
