= Filliozat =

Filliozat is a surname. Notable people with the surname include:

- Jean Filliozat (1906–1982), French scholar
- Pierre-Sylvain Filliozat (1936–2024), French Indologist, son of Jean
