= Sarasvataprakriya =

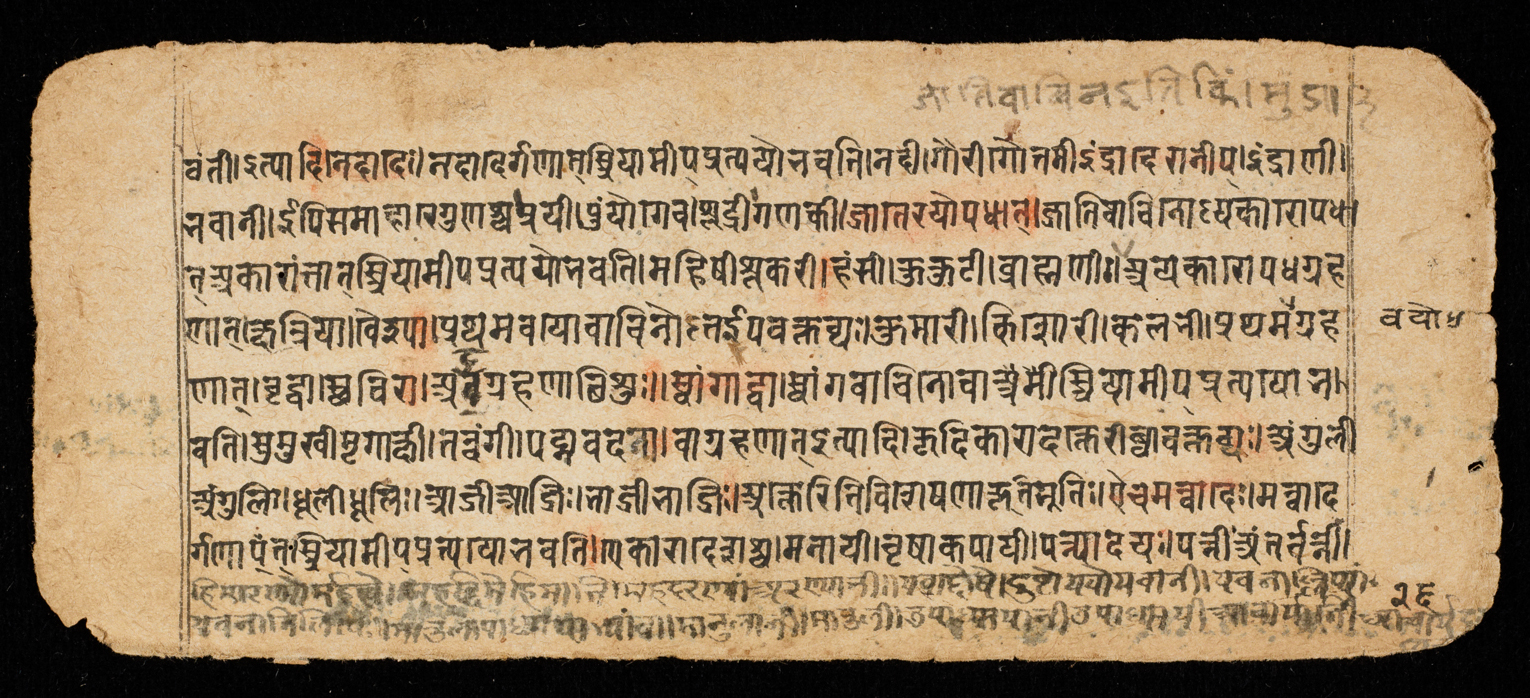
Folio 26v of Sarasvataprakriya

The Sarasvataprakriya (Sanskrit: सारस्वतप्रक्रिया; IAST: Sārasvataprakriyā) is a text on Sanskrit grammar written by Anubhūti Svarūpācārya between 1250 and 1450. It is a commentary on and rearrangement of 700 sutras composed by Narendra and includes around 900 rules. The grammatical system based on this text, called Sārasvatavyākaraṇa, was popular due to its brevity and relative simplicity, especially among Jains. The name "Sārasvata" comes from the claim that Narendra received his inspiration for his sutras from the goddess Sarasvati.
