= Altindische Grammatik =

1896 Sanskrit grammar book

The Altindische Grammatik is the monumental Sanskrit grammar by Jacob Wackernagel (1853–1938), after his death continued by Albert Debrunner, published in Göttingen between 1896 and 1957. The work presents a full discussion of Sanskrit phonology and nominal morphology, but a treatment of the verb is lacking. A fourth volume covering the verb was in preparation by Karl Hoffmann, but was never published, and to this day (the 2010s), a thorough discussion of the Sanskrit verbal system is lacking.

- Introduction générale : Nouvelle édition du texte paru en 1896, au tome I, Louis Renou (1957)
- Vol. I: Lautlehre [phonology] (1896)
  - Additions to Vol. I, Debrunner (1957)
- Vol. II.1: Einleitung zur Wortlehre. Nominalkomposition [introduction into morphology; nominal composition] (1905).
- Vol. II.2: Die Nominalsuffixe [the nominal suffixes] (1954).
- Vol. III: Nominalflexion – Zahlwort – Pronomen [nominal inflection; numeral; pronoun] (1930)
- Index (Richard Hauschild, 1964)
