= Laghushabdendushekhara =

Commentary on Sanskrit grammar

The Laghushabdendushekhara (Sanskrit: लघुशब्देन्दुशेखर; IAST: Laghuśabdenduśekhara) is a commentary by 18th century grammarian Nāgeśa Bhaṭṭa on the Siddhāntakaumudī of Bhaṭṭoji Dīkṣita.
