= Philipp Wackernagel =

German schoolteacher and hymnologist

Carl Eduard Philipp Wackernagel (28 June 1800, in Berlin – 20 June 1877, in Dresden) was a German schoolteacher and hymnologist. He was an older brother of philologist Wilhelm Wackernagel.

He was educated in mineralogy and crystallography at Breslau and Berlin, during which time, he also studied hymnology. While a student his influences included geologist Karl Georg von Raumer. He worked as a teacher at a trade school in Berlin (from 1829) and at a private school in Stetten (Württemberg) from 1839, then in 1845 was named a professor at a Realgymnasium in Wiesbaden, followed by a directorship at a Realschule in Elberfeld (from 1849). In 1861 he received a doctorate in theology from the University of Breslau, and during the same year, moved to Dresden, where he focused on literary and hymnological studies.

He was one of the founders of the Deutscher Evangelischer Kirchentag. In addition to his publications in the field of hymnology, he was the author of works on crystallography and pedagogy.

== Selected works ==
- Das deutsche Kirchenlied : von Martin Luther bis auf Nicolaus Herman und Ambrosius Blaurer (1841) – German hymns of Martin Luther up until Nikolaus Herman and Ambrosius Blaurer / a collection of 850 hymns.
- Paulus Gerhardts geistliche Lieder (1843) – Paul Gerhardt's hymns.
- Über deutsche Orthographie (first part, 1848) – On German orthography.
- Bibliographie zur Geschichte des deutschen Kirchenliedes im 16. Jahrhundert (1855), – Bibliography on the history of German hymns of the 16th century / descriptions of 1,148 song-books and sheets.
- Gesangbuch für Kirche, Schule, und Haus (1860) – Hymnbook for church, school and home.
- Das deutsche Kirchenlied von der ältesten Zeit bis zu Anfang des XVII. Jahrhunderts (5 volumes, 1864–77) – German hymns from the earliest times to the beginning of the 17th century / 6,783 hymns.
- Beiträge zur niederländischen Hymnologie (1867) – Contribution to Dutch hymnology.
