= Brahmapureeswarar Temple =

Shiva temple in Tiruchirappalli district, Tamil Nadu, India

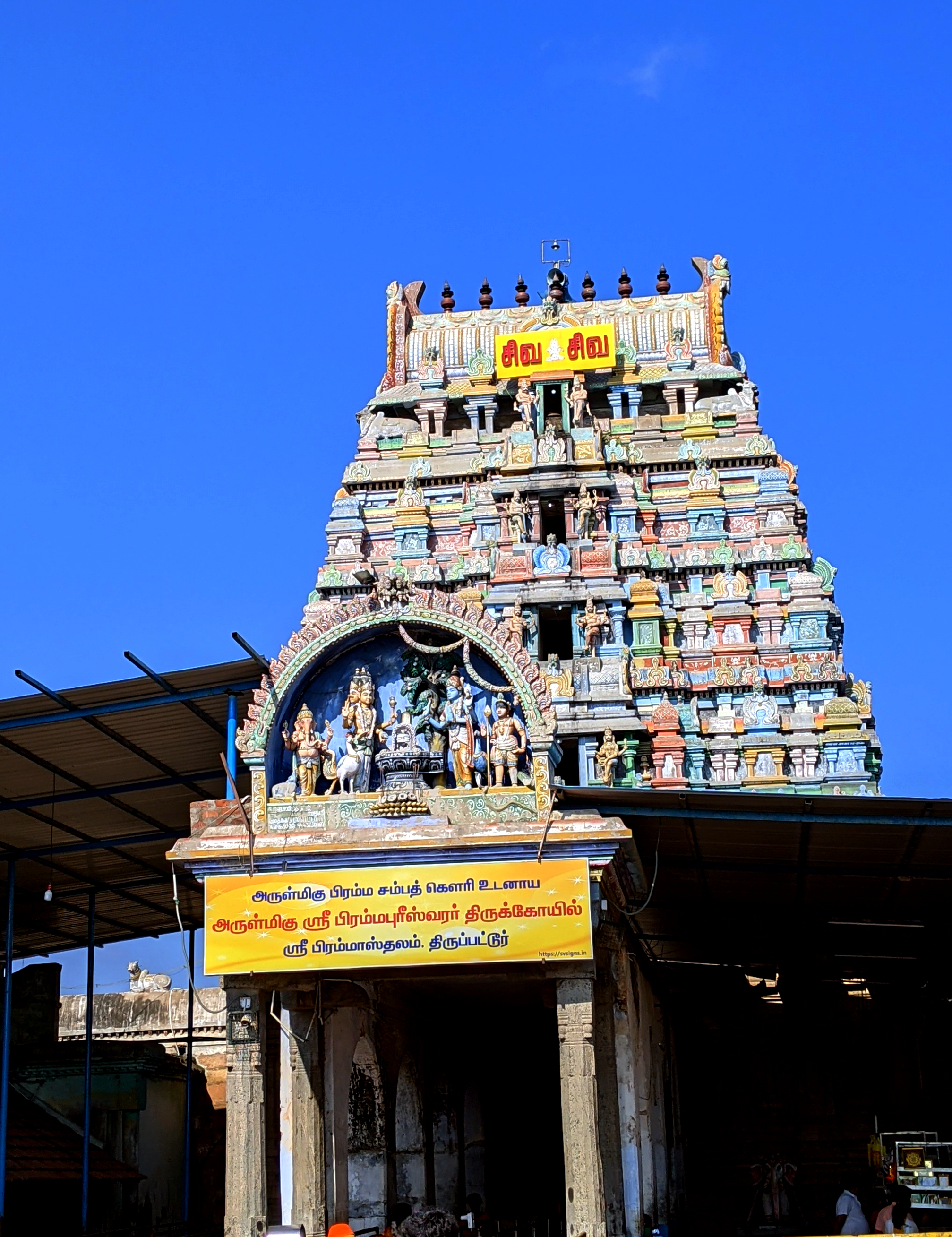
- Brahmapureeswarar Temple, Thiruppattur - March 2021

- Brahmapureeswarar Temple, Thiruppattur, Tiruchirappalli, Tamil Nadu

Religion
- Affiliation: Hinduism
- District: Tiruchirappalli
- Deity: Brahmapureeswarar
- Festival: Maha Shivaratri

Location
- Location: Thiruppattur, Tiruchirappalli
- State: Tamil Nadu
- Country: India
- Interactive map of Brahmapureeswarar Temple
- Coordinates: 11.0382°N 78.7723°E

Architecture
- Type: Tamizh architecture

Specifications
- Temple: One
- Elevation: 123.37 m (405 ft)

The Brahmapureeswarar Temple is a Hindu Temple located in Thirupattur near Trichy, Tamilnadu, India. Worshippers believe that a person can change his fate by seeking the blessings of Brahma and Brahmapureeswarar Shiva Temple, Tirupattur.

== History ==
The god Brahma's overwhelming pride as the Creator of the Universe. Brahma felt that he was more prevailing than Shiva – since he had the supremacy of creation.

This sense of pride provoked Shiva, who destroyed Brahma’s Fifth Head, and also cursed him that he would lose his power of creation.

To relieve himself of this curse, Brahma started out on a pilgrimage of Shiva Temples.

During the course of his pilgrimage, Brahma also visited this temple and installed 12 Shiva Lingams around Brahmapureeswarar and worshipped Shiva here for a considerable time.

Being moved by Brahma's prayers, Shiva, on Devi Parvathi’s appeal, gave him Darshan under the Magizha tree and liberated him from his curse. Shiva also restored the power and responsibility of creation to Brahma.

Shiva also blessed Brahma that he would have a separate shrine at this temple. He also advised Brahma that since Brahma himself had his destiny rewritten here; he should rewrite the destiny of his devotees visiting this temple.

Since the fate of Brahma, the Creator, himself was changed by Shiva at Tirupattur, one can expect a turning point in life by praying at this temple.

The temple is under the administration of The Hindu Religious And Charitable Endowments Department, Government of Tamil Nadu.

== Temple Timings ==
All Days: 7:00 AM – 12:00 PM, 4:00 PM – 8:00 PM

On Every Thursdays:

Open: 5:30 AM – 1:00 PM, 4:00 PM – 8:00 PM

Pooja Timings:

Kalashanthi Pooja: 8:30 AM to 9:30 AM Uchikala Pooja: 11:30 AM to 12:00 PM Sayaratchi Pooja: 6:00 PM to 6:30 PM Arthajama Pooja: 7:30 PM to 8:00 PM

== Literary mentions ==
According to the Tirupaatu, the eighth-century Saint Sundarar has praised about this temple and presiding deity Brahmapureeswarar as follows:

அம்மானே ஆகமசீலர்க்கு அருள் நல்கும் பிரம்மானே
பேரருளாளன் பிடவூரன் தம்மானே
தாந்தமிழ் நூற்புலவானர்க்கோர் அம்மானே
பறவியூன் மண்டலி அம்மானே.

The sage Patañjali is said to have attained Samadhi through yogic meditation at the temple. Jeeva Samadhi of sage Patanjali, which is now an enclosed meditation hall, can be seen near the Brahma's shrine within the temple complex.

== Shrines in the Complex ==
The presiding deities are Brahmapureeswarar in the form of Swayambu Lingam and Devi Brahma Sampath Gowri. There is a separate shrine for Brahma. The idol of Brahma is in meditative pose sitting in Padmasana on a lotus. The temple complex also has the Jeeva Samadhi of Yogi Patanjali, the author of Yoga Sutras.

== The 12 Shrines of Shiva ==
There are 12 Shiv Lingams in the Temple complex, which includes the garden adjacent to the temple. These Shiva Lingams were installed and worshipped by Brahma.

Most of these Shiv Lingams are housed in separate shrines, which are situated around the Brahma Theertham.

Brahma Theertham is the pond from which Brahma took water for performing puja to Shiva.

These 12 shrines of Shiva which comprise the Bramhapureeswarar Temple complex are :

- Sri Brahmapureeswarar Presiding Deity
- Sri Pazhamalai Nathar
- Sri Pathala Eswarar
- Sri Thayumanavar
- Sri Manduga Nathar
- Sri Ekambareswarar
- Sri Arunachaleswarar
- Sri Kailasa Nathar
- Sri Jambukeshwarar
- Sri Kalathi Nathar
- Sri Sabthagereswarar
- Sri Sudharaneswarar

== Recent Miracles ==
Other than the main Shiva shrine, most of the portion of the temple was desolated until 1998. With funding and human support, the temple gained back its popularity in 1999.
