= Vārttikakāra =

A vārttikakāra (Sanskrit: वार्त्तिककार, IPA: [ʋaːɽttɪkɐkaːɽɐ], Commentator), in Indian linguistics and philosophy, is a person who wrote a critical commentary or a gloss on a given grammatical or philosophical work.

Monier Williams Dictionary defines Vārttikakāra as a composer of vārttikas. A vārttika is defined as a single remark or a whole work attempting to present a detailed commentary. The word vārttik- derives from vṛtti, either in the sense of 'the turning (vṛt) of sūtra-formulation into a fully worded paraphrase' or, in the sense of 'procedure (of the teaching)'. According to the Indian tradition, the purpose of a vārttika is to enquire into what has been said (ukta), what has not been said (anukta), and what has not been said clearly (durukta).

== Famous Vārttikakāras ==
- Sureśvara is the commentator of the Advaita Vedanta school. His famous commentaries include the Bŗhadāraņyakopanişad-bhāşya-vārttika and the Taittirīya-vārttika.
- Katyayana is identified as the Vārttikakāra of Indian linguistics, who wrote commentaries on Pāṇini's Aṣṭādhyāyi.
