= Kaumudi Munshi =

Indian classical musician (1929–2020)

Kaumudi Munshi was an Indian classical music musician. She was born in Banaras in 1929, and died in 2020 in Mumbai. Munshi studied Thumri with Siddheshwari Devi and ghazal with Taj Ahmed Khan.
