= Thiruppattur, Tiruchirappalli =

Thiruppattur Tirupattur
- village
- Location in Tamil Nadu, India Thiruppattur (India)
- Coordinates: 11°02′11″N 78°46′18″E
- Country: India
- State: Tamil Nadu
- District: Tiruchirappalli
- Taluka: Manachanallur

Government
  - Body: Village panchayat

Languages
- Time zone: UTC+5:30 (IST)

Thiruppattur (Tirupattur) is a small village in Manachanallur Taluka, Tiruchirappalli district, Tamil Nadu, India. It is 33 km by road north of the city of Tiruchirappalli on the NH-45, the Chennai - Tiruchi highway. It is 18.5 km by road north of the village of Samayapuram, and 15 km by road southwest of Padalur (East).

It is known for the Bramhapureeswarar temple which has a special shrine for Lord Bramha.

== Demographics ==
In the 2001 India census, the village had a population of 2,535, with 1,277 males (50.4%) and 1,258 females (49.6%), for a gender ratio of 985 females per thousand males.
