= Otto von Böhtlingk =

Russian Sanskrit scholar (1815–1904)

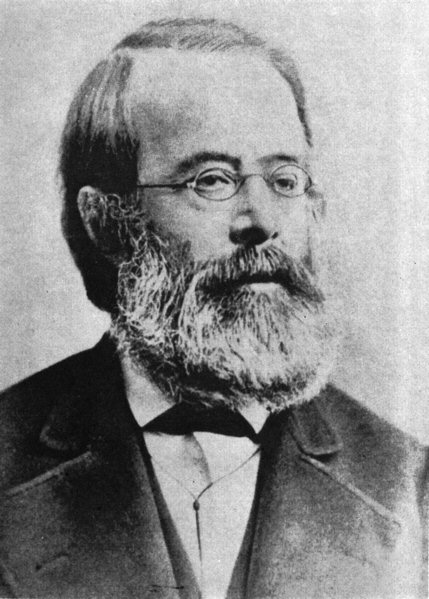
- Portrait of Otto von Böhtlingk
- Born: 30 May [N.S. 11 June] 1815; Saint Petersburg, Russian Empire
- Died: April 1, 1904 (aged 88); Leipzig, Kingdom of Saxony, German Empire
- Citizenship: Russia
- Education: University of Bonn
- Known for: the most notable Russian Sanskritologist of the 19th century, creator of a Sanskrit dictionary in 7 volumes, the first scientific grammar of the Yakut language, etc.
- Awards: Order of Saint Vladimir, Order of Saint Anna, Imperial Order of Saint Stanislaus

Otto von Böhtlingk (Russian: Оттон Николаевич Бётлингк, romanized: Otton Nikolayevich Byotlingk; 30 May [N.S. 11 June] 1815 – 19 March [N.S. 1 April] 1904) was a Russian-German Indologist and Sanskrit scholar. His magnum opus was a Sanskrit-German dictionary.

== Biography ==
He was born in Saint Petersburg, Russia. His German ancestors migrated to Russia from Lübeck in 1713. Having studied (1833–1835) Oriental languages, particularly Arabic, Persian and Sanskrit, at the University of Saint Petersburg, he continued his studies in Germany, first in Berlin and then (1839–1842) in Bonn.

Returning to Saint Petersburg in 1842, he was attached to the Royal Academy of Sciences, and was elected an ordinary member of that society in 1855. In 1860 he was made Russian state councillor, and later privy councillor with a title of nobility. In 1862, the American Philosophical Society elected him an international Member. In 1868 he settled at Jena, and in 1885 moved to Leipzig, where he resided until his death.

== Scholarship ==
Böhtlingk was one of the most distinguished scholars of the nineteenth century, and his works are of pre-eminent value in the field of Indian and comparative philology.

His first great work was a translation of the Sanskrit grammar of Panini, Aṣṭādhyāyī, with a German commentary, under the title Acht Bücher grammatischer Regeln (Bonn, 1839–1840). This was in reality a criticism of Franz Bopp's philological methods.

This work was followed by:

- Vopadevas Grammatik (Saint Petersburg, 1847)
- Über die Sprache der Jakuten (Saint Petersburg, 1851)
- Indische Sprüche, a series of Sanskrit apothegms and proverbial verses (2nd ed. in 3 parts, Saint Petersburg, 1870–1873, to which an index was published by Blau, Leipzig, 1893)
- a critical examination and translation of the Chandogya Upanishad (Saint Petersburg, 1889)
- a translation of the Brihadaranyaka Upanishad (Saint Petersburg, 1889)

His magnum opus was his great Sanskrit-German dictionary, Sanskrit-Wörterbuch (7 vols., Saint Petersburg, 1853–1875; shortened ed. (without citations) 7 vols, Saint Petersburg, 1879–1889), which with the assistance of his two friends, Rudolf Roth (d. 1895) and Albrecht Weber (b. 1825), was completed in 23 years.

He also published several smaller treatises, notably one on Vedic accent, Über den Accent im Sanskrit (1843). Also notable are his Sanskrit-Chrestomathie (Saint Petersburg, 1845; 2d ed., 1877–97), and an edition with translation of a treatise on Hindu poetics by Daṇḍin, Kāvyādarśa (Leipzig, 1890). Böhtlingk took up Panini's grammar again, 47 years after his first edition, when he republished it with a complete translation under the title Panini's Grammatik mit Übersetzung (Leipzig, 1887).

Abhik Ghosh and Paul Kiparsky suggested that Dmitri Mendeleev may have known his contemporary's Böhtlingk's work on the periodic nature of the Sanskrit writing and this helped him in the formulation of the periodic table. According to this suggestion, Mendeleev's use of the prefixes eka, dvi, and tri (Sanskrit for one, two, and three) to name as yet undiscovered chemical elements may be viewed as an homage to Sanskrit grammar and to the Sanskrit grammarian Pāṇini.

== Bibliography ==
- Kalidasa 1842
- with Rudolph Roth, Sanskrit-Wörterbuch Saint Petersburg 1855–1875.
- Sanskrit-Wörterbuch in kürzerer Fassung 1879–1889
- Panini's Grammatik 1887
- Indische Sprüche - Band 1 1863 Band 2 1864 Band 3 1865, Saint Petersburg, Akad. d. Wissenschaften, 1863–65.
- Sanskrit-Chrestomathie 1845
