= Pierre-Sylvain Filliozat =

French Indologist and Sanskrit scholar (1936–2024)

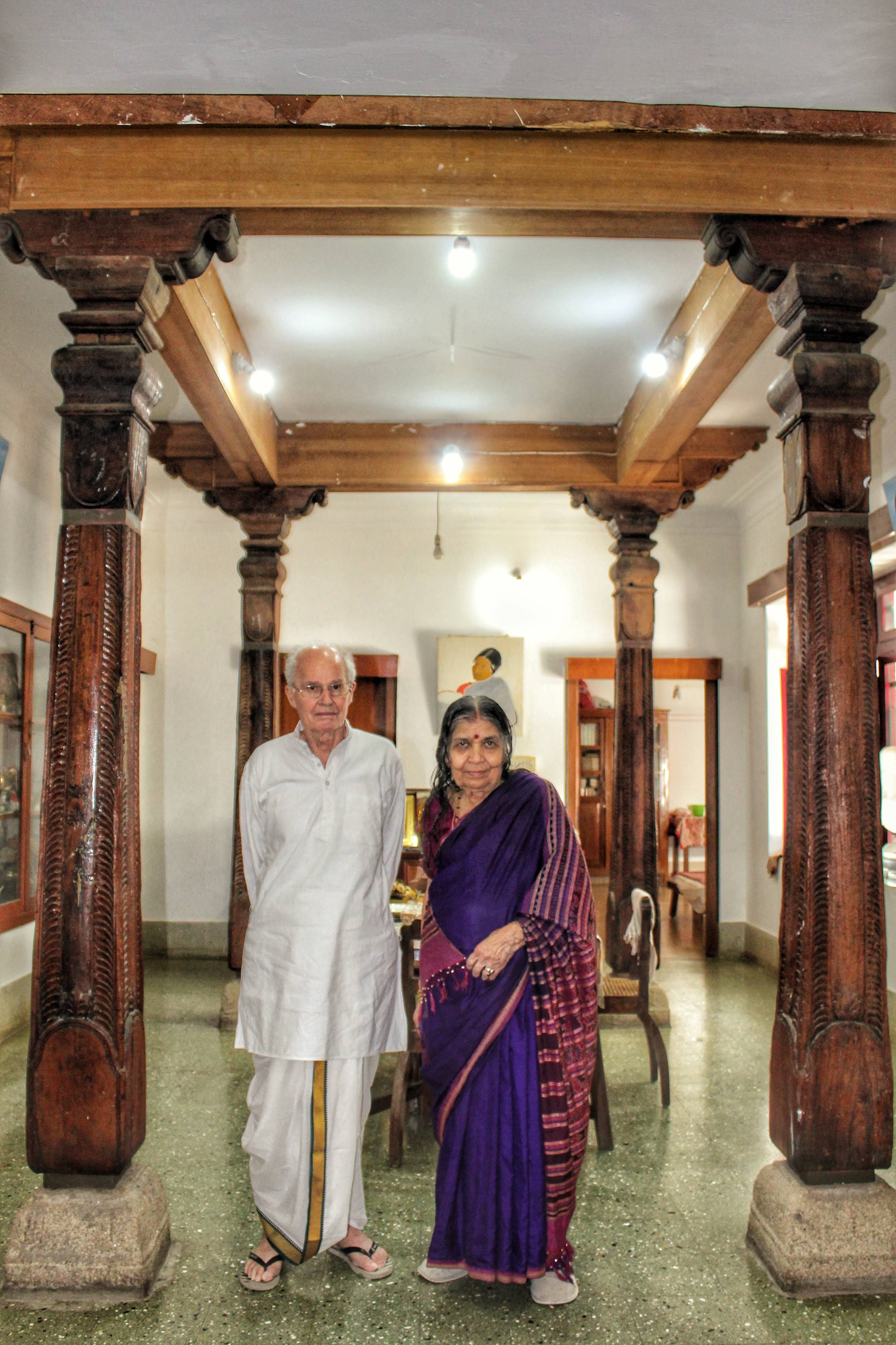
- Filliozat with his wife Vasundhara Kavali Filliozat
- Born: 15 February 1936; Neuilly-sur-Seine, France
- Died: 28 December 2024 (aged 88)
- Occupations: Indologist, Sanskrit scholar
- Employer: École pratique des hautes études
- Known for: Sanskrit poetics, Shaiva literature, Indian architecture
- Spouse: Vasundhara Kavali Filliozat
- Awards: Padma Shri (2024); Chevalier, Légion d'honneur Chevalier, Ordre national du Mérite; Commandeur, Ordre des Palmes académiques

Pierre-Sylvain Filliozat (15 February 1936 – 28 December 2024) was a French Indologist and noted scholar of Sanskrit. He served as Professor of Sanskrit at the École pratique des hautes études in Paris and was honored with India's Padma Shri for his contributions to Sanskrit scholarship.

== Early life and education ==
Born in Neuilly‑sur‑Seine, France, Filliozat was the son of esteemed Indologist Jean Filliozat, founder of the French Institute of Pondicherry. He earned degrees in Sanskrit and Hindi in 1959 and completed his PhD in Paris in 1962, focusing on the 13th‑century poetic treatise *Pratāparudrīya*.

== Academic career ==
Between 1963 and 1967, Filliozat worked with the École française d'Extrême-Orient in Pondicherry. From 1967 to 2004, he held the Chair of Sanskrit at the École pratique des hautes études and later became Emeritus Professor. He traveled frequently to India, working with traditional Sanskrit pandits and conducting research at Mysore and Pondicherry institutions. He authored over 20 books and some 250 articles across Sanskrit grammar, philology, epigraphy, Śaiva traditions, and temple architecture.

== Honours and recognition ==
In France, he was elected to the Académie des Inscriptions et Belles‑Lettres (President in 2010) and served as Vice-President of the Société Asiatique (2000–2019). In India, he received:

- Padma Shri (2024) for literature & education—among four French nationals honoured during President Macron's state visit.
- Certificate of Honour for Sanskrit (2014)
- Mahāmahopādhyāya (2013, Lal Bahadur Shastri Sanskrit Vidyapeeth)
- Vanamali Samman (Mysore)
- Honorary Fellowship, Samvidya Cultural Studies (Pune)

Following his death, India’s Prime Minister Narendra Modi and the Indian Embassy in Paris formally condoled his passing, noting his role in popularising Sanskrit studies.

== Personal life and death ==
He was married to Karnataka-born art historian Vasundhara Kavali Filliozat. They maintained long-term links with Mysore, dividing their time between France and India. He died on 28 December 2024 in Paris and was survived by his wife, two daughters, and grandchildren.

== Selected publications ==
- *La syntaxe du nom en sanskrit* (1967)
- *Grammaire sanskrite* (with Louis Renou)
- Edition of *Pratāparudrīya* by Vidyānātha
- Critical editions and translations of *Tantrāloka* by Abhinavagupta
- Numerous works on Śaiva āgamas and South Indian temple architecture
