= Mahabhashya =

Sanskrit work of commentary

Mahabhashya (Sanskrit: महाभाष्य, IAST: Mahābhāṣya, IPA: [mɐɦaːbʱaːʂjɐ], "Great Commentary"), attributed to Patañjali, is a commentary on selected rules of Sanskrit grammar from Pāṇini's treatise, the Aṣṭādhyāyī, as well as Kātyāyana's Vārttika-sūtra, an elaboration of Pāṇini's grammar. It is dated to the 2nd century BCE.

== Overview ==
Patañjali is one of the three most famous Sanskrit grammarians of ancient India, other two being Pāṇini and Kātyāyana who preceded Patañjali (dated to c. 250 BCE). Kātyāyana's work (nearly 1500 verses on Pāṇini) is available only through references in Patañjali's work.

It was with Patañjali that the Indian tradition of language scholarship reached its definite form. The system thus established is extremely detailed as to shiksha (phonology, including accent) and vyakarana (grammar and morphology). Syntax is scarcely touched, but nirukta (etymology) is discussed, and these etymologies naturally lead to semantic explanations. People interpret his work to be a defence of Pāṇini, whose Sutras are elaborated meaningfully. Patañjali also examines Kātyāyana rather severely. But the main contributions of Patañjali lies in the treatment of the principles of grammar enunciated by him.

Kātyāyana introduced semantic discourse into grammar, which was further elaborated by Patañjali to such an extent that Mahābhāṣya can be called a mix of grammar as such as well as a philosophy of grammar. Kāśika-vritti by Jayāditya and Vāmana (mentioned by Itsing) included viewpoints of other grammarians also which did not conform to Patañjali's views.

The extant Mahābhāṣya text is available on 1228 of the 3981 sūtras of the Aṣṭādhyāyī. The Mahābhāṣya is divided into eighty five sections called āhnika consisting of subject matter of one day's study each.

== Mentions and commentaries ==
- Satyapriya Tirtha (c. 1701 – c. 1744), a pīṭhadhipati of Uttaradi Matha belonging to Dvaita school of Vedanta wrote a commentary on Mahābhāṣya named Mahābhāṣya Vivarana.
- James R. Ballantyne (c. 1813 – c. 1864) published the first part of the Mahābhāṣya of Patañjali in 1856, for the first time opening native Indian grammatical tradition to a wider European scholarly audience.

== Bibliography ==
=== Editions ===
- Franz, Kielhorn (1892–1909). The Vyākaraṇa-Mahābhāṣya of Patañjali (2 ed.). Bombay: Government Central Book depot. In Sanskrit.

=== Secondary Literature ===
- Cardona, George (1997). Pāṇini: A Survey of Research. Motilal Banarsidass Publications. ISBN 978-81-208-1494-3.
- Malkovsky, Bradley J. (2001), The Role of Divine Grace in the Soteriology of Śaṃkarācārya, BRILL, ISBN 9004120440
- Kahrs, Eivind (1998), Indian Semantic Analysis: The Nirvacana Tradition, Cambridge University Press, ISBN 9780521631884
