= Bhaṭṭoji Dīkṣita =

17th-century Maharashtrian Sanskrit grammarian

- Born: Maharashtra or Andhra Pradesh, India

Philosophical work
- Era: 17th-century
- Main interests: Sanskrit Grammar, linguistics
- Notable works: Siddhantakaumudi, Shabdakaustubha, Prauda Manorama
- Notable ideas: Sphota

Bhattoji Dikshita was a 17th-century Sanskrit grammarian who authored the Siddhānta Kaumudī, Shabda-Kaustubha, and Prauda Manorama. He was born into a Brahmin family and settled in Varanasi, a major hub for Sanskrit learning. Here, he focused on his scholarly pursuits through financial support from the local rulers.

== Early life and education ==
Bhattoji was born into a Brahmin family possibly from Maharashtra or Andhra Pradesh. Bhattoji settled in Varanasi before 1600 C.E. Varanasi, a major hub for Sanskrit learning, provided Bhattoji the opportunity to master and contribute to the tradition of Pāṇinian grammar.

In Varanasi, Bhattoji and his family received financial support from local rulers belonging to the Keladi royal family, Venkatappa Nayaka I and Virabhadra of the Ikkeri Kingdom, which allowed Bhattoji to focus on scholarly pursuits. Bhattoji learned from distinguished scholars, notably Shesha Krishna (Śeṣa Kṛṣṇa). Shesha Krishna was a grammarian known for his commentary on Ramachandra's Prakriyakaumudi called Prakasha (Prakāśa).

== Notable works ==
Bhattoji's contributions to Sanskrit grammar are seen in his works:

1. Shabda-kaustubha (Śabdakaustubha) - a commentary of Patanjali's Mahabhashya
2. Siddhanta-kaumudi (Siddhāntakaumudī) - a categorized presentation of Panini's grammar
3. Prauda Manorama (Prauḍha-manoramā) - a commentary on the Siddhanta Kaumudi

His works have been studied for generations for Sanskrit grammatical studies into the modern era.

== Siddhānta Kaumudī ==
Siddhānta Kaumudī is a Sanskrit treatise restructuring Pāṇini's Aṣṭādhyāyī to make it more accessible for learners. It re-arranges the sūtras of Pāṇini under appropriate heads and offers exposition that is orderly and easy to follow.

=== Commentaries on Siddhānta Kaumudī ===
==== Bālamanoramā ====
Bālamanoramā of Vāsudeva Dīkṣita's is one of the most celebrated commentary on Siddhanta Kaumudi. He goes into great detail explaining derivations and is thereby most useful to beginners (bāla, lit. "child").

==== Prauḍhamanoramā ====
Prauḍhamanoramā is an auto-commentary on Siddhānta Kaumudī by Bhaṭṭoji Dīkṣita. Both the Siddhānta Kaumudī and Prauḍhamanoramā are commented on by many others also.

==== Tattva Bodhinī ====
Tattva Bodhinī by Jñānendra Sarasvatī is a terser, more scholarly and demanding commentary, essentially a distillation of the Prauḍhamanoramā.

==== Laghuśabdenduśekhara ====
Laghuśabdenduśekhara is a commentary by 18th century grammarian Nāgeśa Bhaṭṭa on the Siddhānta Kaumudī.

== Philosophical contributions ==
His work on the concept of sphota is noteworthy compared to earlier grammarians. Bhattoji shifted focus to the semantics of sphota versus the ontological aspects. Bhattoji viewed it as a single, indivisible unit of sound. Bhattoji believed sphota contained meaning not just a sound.
