= Patanjali =

Ancient Indian scholar(s)

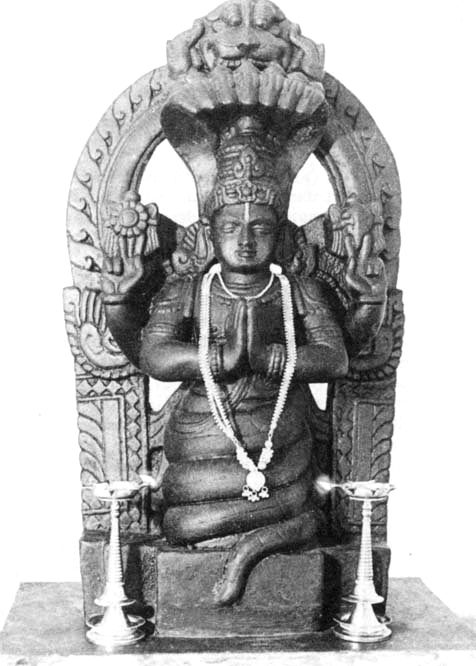
Statue of Patañjali, in traditional snake form indicating kundalini or an incarnation of Shesha

Patanjali (Sanskrit: पतञ्जलि, IAST: Patañjali, Sanskrit pronunciation: [pɐtɐɲdʑɐli]; also called Gonardiya or Gonikaputra) (Note: These names of Sanskrit authors are generally identified with Patanjali. Gonardiya denotes someone from Gonarda, which has been identified by some with the Gonda in Uttar Pradesh. Gonikaputra means the son of a woman named Gonika.) was the name of one or more author(s), mystic(s) and philosopher(s) in ancient India. His name is recorded as an author and compiler of a number of Sanskrit works. The greatest of these is the Yoga Sutras, a classical yoga text. Estimates based on analysis of this work suggests that its author(s) may have lived between the 2nd century BCE and the 5th century CE.

An author of the same name is credited with the authorship of the classic text on Sanskrit grammar named Mahābhāṣya, that is firmly datable to the 2nd century BCE, and authorship of medical texts possibly dating from 8th-10th centuries CE. The two works, Mahābhāṣya and Yoga Sutras, are completely different in subject matter, and Indologist Louis Renou has shown that there are significant differences in language, grammar and vocabulary. Before the time of Bhoja (11th century), no known text conflates the identity of the two authors.

There has been speculation as to whether the sage Patañjali is the author of all the works attributed to him, as there are a number of known historical authors of the same name. A great deal of scholarship has been devoted over the 20th century to the issue of the historicity or identity of this author or these authors. The view that these were likely different authors is now generally accepted by Western scholars, but "glorification" of Patanjali as singular author of the yoga, grammar, and medical texts "has become an oft-repeated article of faith" "in more traditional circles" and yoga culture.

Patanjali is regarded as an avatar of Adi Sesha.

== Identities ==
Amongst the more important authors called Patañjali are:

- The author of the Mahābhāṣya, an ancient treatise on Sanskrit grammar and linguistics, based on the Aṣṭādhyāyī of Pāṇini. This Patañjali's life is dated to mid 2nd century BCE by both Western and Indian scholars. This text was titled as a bhashya or "commentary" on Kātyāyana-Pāṇini's work by Patanjali, but is so revered in the Indian traditions that it is widely known simply as Mahā-bhasya or "Great commentary". As per Ganesh Sripad Huparikar, actually, Patanjali (2nd century BCE), the forerunner among ancient grammatical commentators, "adopted an etymological and dialectical method of explaining in the whole of his 'Mahābhāshya' (Great Commentary), and this has assumed, in the later commentary literature the definite form of 'Khanda-anvaya'." So vigorous, well reasoned and vast is his text, that this Patanjali has been the authority as the last grammarian of classical Sanskrit for more than 2,000 years, with Pāṇini and Kātyāyana preceding him. Their ideas on structure, grammar and philosophy of language have also influenced scholars of other Indian religions such as Buddhism and Jainism.
- The compiler of the Yoga sūtras, a text on Yoga theory and practice, and a notable scholar of Samkhya school of Hindu philosophy. He is variously estimated to have lived between 2nd century BCE to 4th century CE, with many scholars narrowing this period down to between 2nd and 4th century CE. The Yogasutras is one of the most important texts in the Indian tradition and the foundation of classical Yoga. It is the Indian Yoga text that was most translated in its medieval era into forty Indian languages.
- The author of a medical text called Patanjalatantra. He is cited and this text is quoted in many medieval health sciences-related texts, and Patanjali is called a medical authority in a number of Sanskrit texts such as Yogaratnakara, Yogaratnasamuccaya and Padarthavijnana. There is a fourth Hindu scholar also named Patanjali, who likely lived in 8th-century CE and wrote a commentary on Charaka Samhita and this text is called Carakavarttika. According to some modern era Indian scholars such as P.V. Sharma, the two medical scholars named Patanjali may be the same person, but completely different person from the Patanjali who wrote the Sanskrit grammar classic Mahābhashya.
- Patanjali is one of the 18 siddhars in the Tamil siddha (Shaiva) tradition.

== Name ==
According to Monier Monier-Williams, the word "Patañjali" is a compound name from "pata" (Sanskrit: पत, "falling, flying") and "añj" (अञ्ज्, "honor, celebrate, beautiful") or "añjali" (अञ्जलि, "reverence, joining palms of the hand"). It means, flowing from reverence.

== Life ==
Many scholars including Louis Renou have suggested that the Patañjali who wrote on Yoga was a different person than the Patanjali who wrote a commentary on Panini's grammar. In 1914, James Wood proposed that they were the same person. In 1922, Surendranath Dasgupta presented a series of arguments to tentatively propose that the famed Grammar text and the Yoga text author may be identical.

The view that these were likely two different authors is generally accepted, but some Western scholars consider them as a single entity.

Some in the Indian tradition have held that one Patañjali wrote treatises on grammar, medicine and yoga. This has been memorialised in a verse by Bhoja at the start of his commentary on the Yogasutras called Rājamārttanda (11th century), and the following verse found in Shivarama's 18th-century text:

योगेन चित्तस्य पदेन वाचां मलं शरीरस्य च वैद्यकेन। योऽपाकरोत्तं प्रवरं मुनीनां पतञ्जलिं प्राञ्जलिरानतोऽस्मि॥

Yōgēna cittasya padēna vācāṁ malaṁ śarīrasya ca vaidyakēna. Yōpākarōttaṁ pravaraṁ munīnāṁ patañjaliṁ prāñjalirānatōsmi

English translation: I bow with my hands together to the eminent sage Patañjali, who removed the impurities of the mind through yoga, of speech through grammar, and of the body through medicine.

This tradition is discussed by Meulenbeld who traces this "relatively late" idea back to Bhoja (11th century), who was perhaps influenced by a verse by Bhartṛhari (ca. 5th century) that speaks of an expert in yoga, medicine and grammar who, however, is not named. No known Sanskrit text prior to the 10th century states that the one and the same Patanjali was behind all the three treatises.

The sage Patañjali is said to have attained Samadhi through yogic meditation at the Brahmapureeswarar Temple located at Tirupattur, Tamil Nadu, India. Jeeva Samadhi of sage Patanjali, which is now an enclosed meditation hall, can be seen near the Brahma's shrine within Brahmapureeswarar Temple complex.

=== Grammatical tradition ===
In the grammatical tradition, Patañjali is believed to have lived in the second century BCE. He wrote a Mahabhasya on Panini's sutras, in a form that quoted the commentary of Kātyāyana's vārttikas. This is a major influential work on Sanskrit grammar and linguistics. The dating of Patanjali and his Mahabhasya is established by a combination of evidence: that from the Maurya Empire period, the historical events mentioned in the examples he used to explain his ideas, the chronology of ancient classical Sanskrit texts that respect his teachings, and the mention of his text or his name in ancient Indian literature. Of the three ancient grammarians, the chronological dating of Patanjali to mid 2nd century B.C. is considered as "reasonably accurate" by mainstream scholarship.

The text influenced Buddhist grammatical literature, as well as memoirs of travellers to India. For example, the Chinese pilgrim I-tsing mentions that the Mahabhasya is studied in India and advanced scholars learn it in three years.

=== Yoga tradition ===
Self study

Practice self study,
to commune with
your chosen divinity.

— Patanjali, Yogasutras II.44

In the Yoga tradition, Patañjali is a revered name. This Patañjali's oeuvre comprises the sutras about Yoga (Yogasūtra) and the commentary integral to the sutras, called the Bhāṣya. Some consider the sutras and the Bhaṣya to have had different authors, the commentary being ascribed to "an editor" (Skt. "vyāsa"). According to Phillipp Maas, the same person named Patanjali composed the sutras and the Bhāṣya commentary.

Radhakrishnan and Moore attribute the text to the grammarian Patañjali, dating it as 2nd century BCE, during the Maurya Empire (322–185 BCE). Maas estimates Patañjali's Yogasutra's date to be about 400 CE, based on tracing the commentaries on it published in the first millennium CE. Edwin Bryant, on the other hand, surveys the major commentators in his translation of the Yoga Sūtras. He states that "most scholars date the text shortly after the turn of the Common Era (circa first to second century), but that it has been placed as early as several centuries before that." Bryant concludes that "A number of scholars have dated the Yoga Sūtras as late as the fourth or fifth century CE, but these arguments have all been challenged", and late chronology for this Patanjali and his text are problematic.

=== Tamil Saivite legend ===
Regarding his early years, the Tamil Saiva Siddhanta tradition from around 10th century CE holds that Patañjali learned Yoga along with seven other disciples from the great Yogic Guru Nandhi Deva, as stated in Tirumular's Tirumandiram (Tantra 1). His Samadhi is said to be at Rameswaram Shiva temple and a shrine for him still exists in the temple.

Nandhi arulPetra Nadharai Naadinom
Nandhigal Nalvar Siva Yoga MaaMuni
Mandru thozhuda Patañjali Vyakramar
Endrivar Ennodu (Thirumoolar) Enmarumaame

Translation

We sought the feet of the God who graced Nandikesvara
The Four Nandhis,
Sivayoga Muni, Patañjali, Vyaghrapada and I (Thirumoolar)
We were these eight.

== Works ==
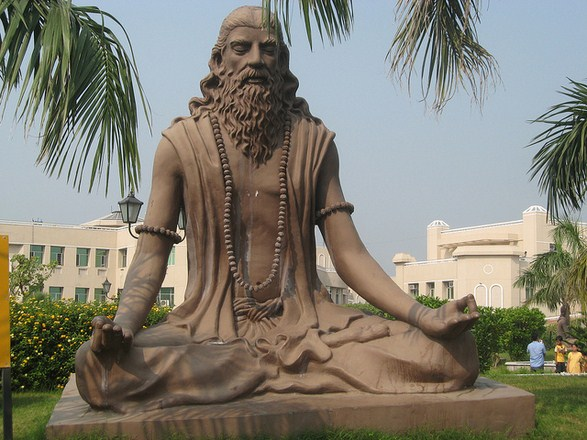
Patañjali – Modern art rendering in Patanjali Yogpeeth, Haridwar

Whether the two works, the Yoga Sutras and the Mahābhāṣya, are by the same author has been the subject of considerable debate. The authorship of the two is first attributed to the same person in Bhojadeva's Rajamartanda, a relatively late (10th century) commentary on the Yoga Sutras, as well as several subsequent texts. As for the texts themselves, the Yoga Sutra iii.44 cites a sutra as that from Patanjali by name, but this line itself is not from the Mahābhāṣya. This 10th-century legend of single-authorship is doubtful. The literary styles and contents of the Yogasūtras and the Mahābhāṣya are entirely different, and the only work on medicine attributed to Patañjali is lost. Sources of doubt include the lack of cross-references between the texts, and no mutual awareness of each other, unlike other cases of multiple works by (later) Sanskrit authors. Also, some elements in the Yoga Sutras may date from as late as the 4th century CE, but such changes may be due to divergent authorship, or due to later additions which are not atypical in the oral tradition. Most scholars refer to both works as "by Patanjali", without meaning that they are by the same author.

In addition to the Mahābhāṣya and Yoga Sūtras, the 11th-century commentary on Charaka by the Bengali scholar Chakrapani Datta, and the 16th-century text Patanjalicarita ascribes to Patañjali a medical text called the Carakapratisaṃskṛtaḥ (now lost) which is apparently a revision (pratisaṃskṛtaḥ) of the medical treatise by Caraka. While there is a short treatise on yoga in the medical work called the Carakasaṃhitā (by Caraka), towards the end of the chapter called śārīrasthāna, it is notable for not bearing much resemblance to the Yoga Sūtras, and in fact presents a form of eightfold yoga that is completely different from that laid out by Patañjali in the Yoga Sūtras and the commentary Yogasūtrabhāṣya.

=== Yoga Sūtra ===
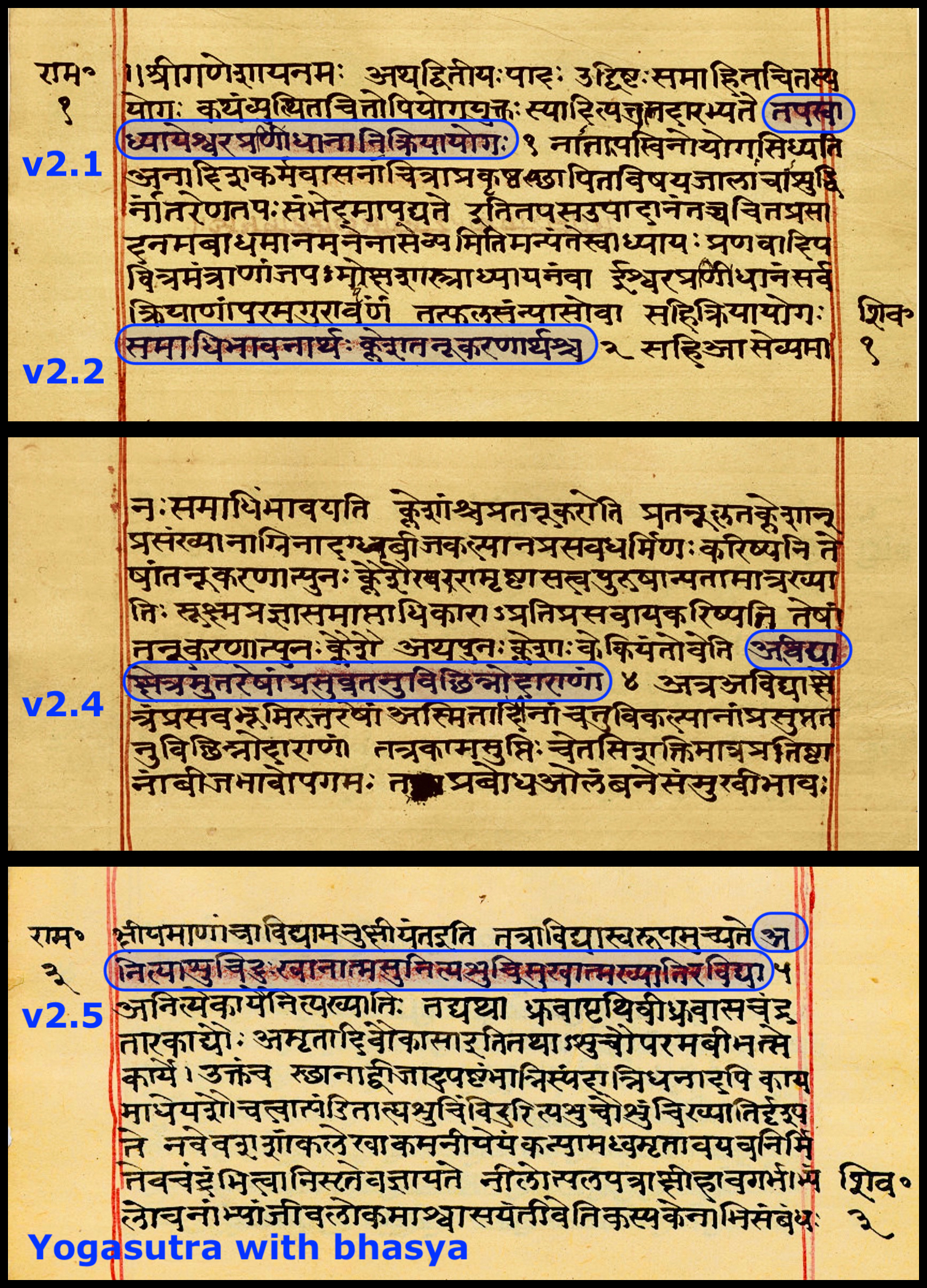
Some pages from a historic Yogasutra manuscript (Sanskrit, Devanagari). The verses are highlighted and are embedded inside the bhasya (commentary).

The Yoga Sūtras of Patañjali are 196 Indian sutras (aphorisms) on Yoga. It was the most translated ancient Indian text in the medieval era, having been translated into about forty Indian languages and two non-Indian languages: Old Javanese and Arabic. The text fell into obscurity for nearly 700 years from the 12th to 19th century, and made a comeback in late 19th century due to the efforts of Swami Vivekananda and others. It gained prominence again as a comeback classic in the 20th century.

Before the 20th century, history indicates the Indian yoga scene was dominated by other Yoga texts such as the Bhagavad Gita, Yoga Vasistha and Yoga Yajnavalkya. Scholars consider the Yoga Sūtras of Patañjali formulations as one of the foundations of classical Yoga philosophy of Hinduism.

=== Mahābhāṣya ===
The Mahābhāṣya ("great commentary") of Patañjali on the Aṣṭādhyāyī of Pāṇini is a major early exposition on Pāṇini, along with the somewhat earlier Varttika by Katyayana. Patanjali relates to how words and meanings are associated – Patanjali claims shabdapramâNaH – that the evidentiary value of words is inherent in them, and not derived externally – the word-meaning association is natural. These issues in the word-meaning relation (symbol) would be elaborated in the Sanskrit linguistic tradition, in debates between the Mimamsa, Nyaya and Buddhist schools over the next fifteen centuries.

==== Sphota ====
Patanjali also defines an early notion of sphota, which would be elaborated considerably by later Sanskrit linguists like Bhartrihari. In Patanjali, a sphoTa (from sphuT, spurt/burst) is the invariant quality of speech. The noisy element (dhvani, audible part) can be long or short, but the sphoTa remains unaffected by individual speaker differences. Thus, a single letter or 'sound' (varNa) such as k, p or a is an abstraction, distinct from variants produced in actual enunciation. This concept has been linked to the modern notion of phoneme, the minimum distinction that defines semantically distinct sounds. Thus a phoneme is an abstraction for a range of sounds. However, in later writings, especially in Bhartrihari (6th century CE), the notion of sphoTa changes to become more of a mental state, preceding the actual utterance, akin to the lemma.

Patañjali's writings also elaborate some principles of morphology (prakriyā). In the context of elaborating on Pāṇini's aphorisms, he also discusses Kātyāyana's commentary, which are also aphoristic and sūtra-like; in the later tradition, these were transmitted as embedded in Patañjali's discussion. In general, he defends many positions of Pāṇini which were interpreted somewhat differently in Katyayana.

==== Metaphysics as grammatical motivation ====
Unlike Pāṇini's objectives in the Ashtyadhyayi, which is to distinguish correct forms and meanings from incorrect ones (shabdaunushasana), Patanjali's objectives are more metaphysical. These include the correct recitations of the scriptures (Agama), maintaining the purity of texts (raksha), clarifying ambiguity (asamdeha), and also the pedagogic goal of providing an easier learning mechanism (laghu). This stronger metaphysical bent has also been indicated by some as one of the unifying themes between the Yoga Sutras and the Mahābhāṣya, although a close examination of actual Sanskrit usage by Woods showed no similarities in language or terminology.

The text of the Mahābhāṣya was first critically edited by the 19th-century orientalist Franz Kielhorn, who also developed philological criteria for distinguishing Kātyāyana's "voice" from Patañjali's. Subsequently, a number of other editions have come out, the 1968 text and translation by S.D. Joshi and J.H.F. Roodbergen often being considered definitive. Regrettably, the latter work is incomplete.

Patanjali is often stated as having claimed there was a hostility between the orthodox Brahminic (Astika) groups and the heterodox, nAstika groups (Buddhism, Jainism, and atheists), like that between a mongoose and a snake. Nathan McGovern argues Patanjali never used this mongoose-snake analogy.

Patanjali also sheds light on contemporary events, commenting on the recent Greek incursion, and also on several tribes that lived in the Northwest regions of the subcontinent.

=== Patanjalatantra ===
Patanjali is also the reputed author of a medical text called Patanjalah, also called Patanjala or Patanjalatantra. This text is quoted in many yoga and health-related Indian texts. Patanjali is called a medical authority in Sanskrit texts such as Yogaratnakara, Yogaratnasamuccaya, Padarthavijnana, Cakradatta bhasya. Some of these quotes are unique to Patanjala, but others are also found in major Hindu medical treatises such as Charaka Samhita and Sushruta Samhita.

There is a fourth scholar named Patanjali, who likely lived in 8th-century and wrote a commentary on Charaka Samhita called Carakavarttika. The two medical scholars named Patanjali may be the same person, but generally accepted to be completely different from the Patanjali who wrote the Sanskrit grammar classic Mahabhasya.

== Legacy ==
Patanjali is honoured with invocations and shrines in some modern schools of yoga, including Iyengar Yoga and Ashtanga Vinyasa Yoga. The yoga scholar David Gordon White writes that yoga teacher training often includes "mandatory instruction" in the Yoga Sutra. White calls this "curious to say the least", since the text is in his view essentially irrelevant to "yoga as it is taught and practiced today", commenting that the Yoga Sutra is "nearly devoid of discussion of postures, stretching, and breathing".

== See also ==
- Bhartrihari
- Yoga Sutras of Patanjali
- Yoga Vashista
- Yoga Yajnavalkya
- Vedanga
- Ashtanga
