= Jacob Wackernagel =

Swiss linguist (1853–1938)

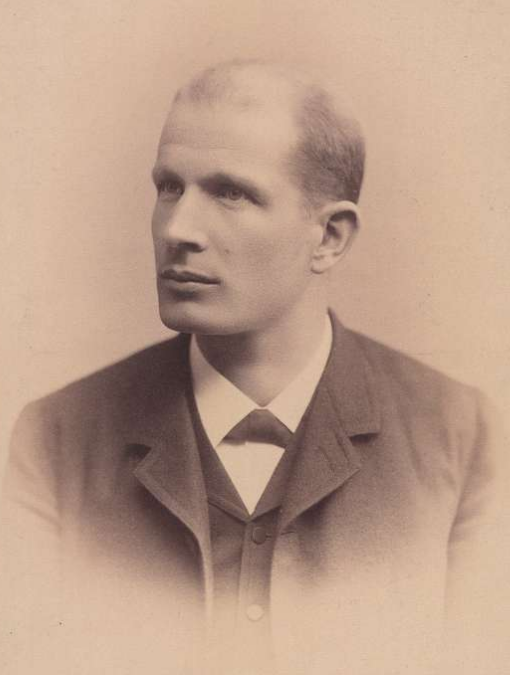
- Wackernagel in 1890
- Born: 11 December 1853; Basel, Switzerland
- Died: 22 May 1938 (aged 84); Basel, Switzerland
- Occupation: linguist
- Notable work: Altindische Grammatik, Lectures on Syntax
- Father: Wilhelm Wackernagel

Jacob Wackernagel (Note: Also Jakob, his ex libris in 1897 and owner's name in his own hand has "Jakob" (cf. illustrations).) (Swiss Standard German: [ˈvakərˌnaːɡl̩]; 11 December 1853 – 22 May 1938) was a Swiss linguist, Indo-Europeanist and scholar of Sanskrit. He was born in Basel, son of the philologist Wilhelm Wackernagel (1806–1869).

== Biography ==
Jacob Wackernagel was born on 11 December 1853 in Basel to Wilhelm Wackernagel, a Professor of German Language and Literature in Basel, and his second wife, Maria Salome (nee Sarasin). He was named after his godfather, Jacob Grimm of the Brothers Grimm. Jacob's father died when he was sixteen.

Wackernagel studied classical and Germanic philology and history at Basel (1871–1872), Göttingen (1872–1874) and Leipzig (1874–1875); he started a doctorate at Basel in 1875, writing his thesis on "the beginnings of the study of 'pathology' (in a sense, a rudimentary study of speech sounds) in the Greek grammarians". He defended that thesis in 1876, among his examiners were Nietzsche and Heyne. Wackernagel then spent a short time studying at Oxford and began lecturing as Privatdozent in Basel in the winter semester of 1876–1877. In 1879, at the age of 26, he became a successor of Friedrich Nietzsche as Professor of Greek.

He married Maria Stehlin, with whom he had eight children, in 1886. Two of their sons, Jakob and Hans Georg, became Basel professors.

In 1902 he was offered a chair of comparative philology in the University of Göttingen and was a Pro-Rector in 1912/13, but as a consequence of World War I he returned to Basel in 1915. In Basel, he was soon appointed to the chair of linguistics and classical philology, and he held this position until his retirement in 1936. He taught for sixty years. In 1918–1919, he briefly became a Rector of the University; he held this position before in 1890. Wackernagel died on 22 May 1938 at home in Basel.

== Work ==
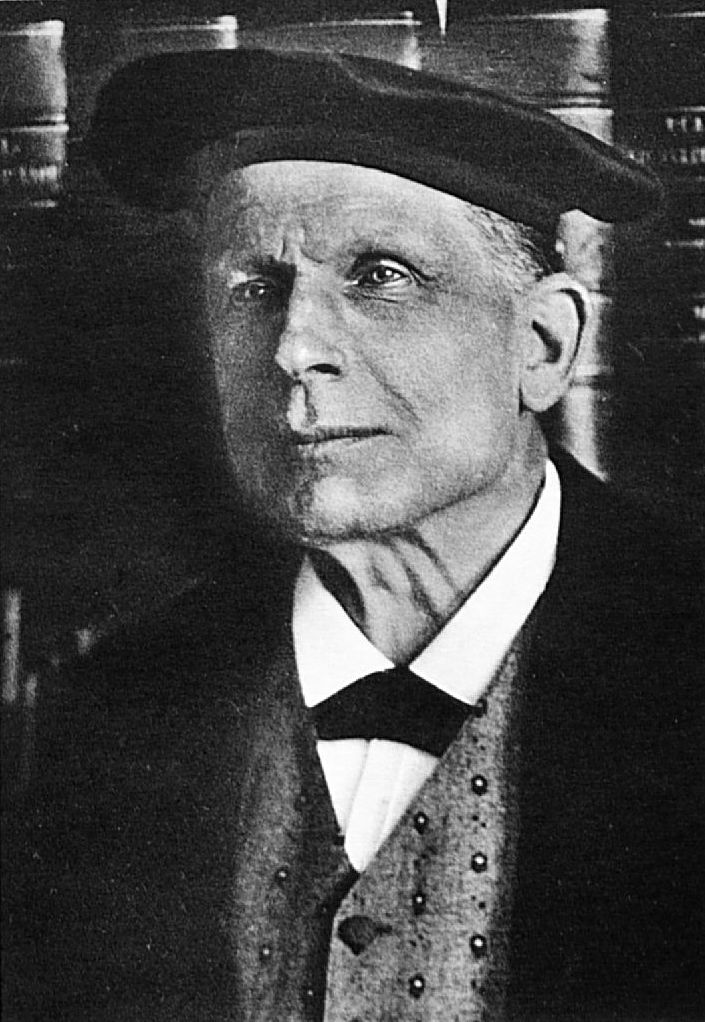
Wackernagel as a pro-rector of the University of Gottingen, 1912–1913

Wackernagel's major work is the Altindische Grammatik, a comprehensive grammar of Sanskrit.

He is best known among modern linguists and philologists for formulating Wackernagel's law, concerning the placement of unstressed words (enclitic sentential particles) in syntactic second position in Indo-European clauses (Wackernagel 1892).

Another law named after him (Wackernagel 1889) is Wackernagel's law of lengthening (Dehnungsgesetz in German), also sometimes known as the law of lengthening in composition (Regelung der Dehnung in der Zusammensetzung): in some compound words in Greek the first component ends with a vowel and the second component begins with a vowel; when neither vowel is high the first vowel is elided without effect and the second is replaced by its long counterpart.

== Lectures on Syntax ==
Wackernagel read two courses in 1918–1919, while being a Rector, on "the elements of syntax with special reference to Greek, Latin and Germanic". Lectures notes were taken by two of his students. "First series" of lectures were published in 1920, it contained themes of "number, voice, tense, mood, and the non-finite forms of the verb". The book was successful, and in 1924 the "second series" were published "on gender, nouns and adjectives, pronouns, the article, prepositions, and negation". Second edition was published in 1926 and 1928. The book was translated into English by David Langslow in 2009. Andreas Willi of the University of Oxford praised both Wackernagel's work and Langslow's translation, writing "A hallmark feature of Wackernagel's Lectures is their accessible style, which makes them easy to read from cover to cover. Langslow impressively succeeds in preserving this feature: while not being slavish, his translation is both accurate and idiomatic."

== Selected works ==
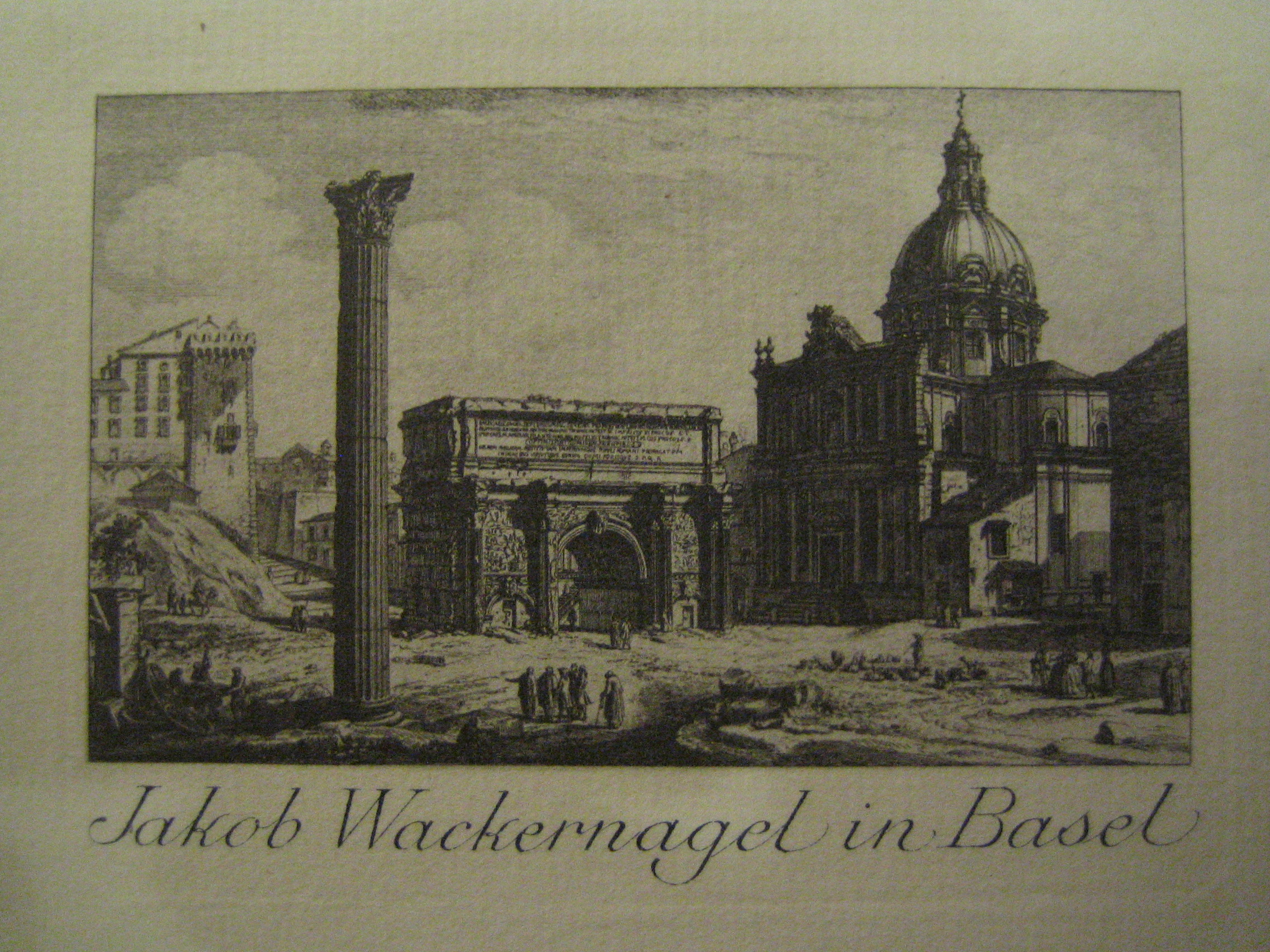
Ex Libris, 1897

- Jacob Wackernagel, Altindische Grammatik
- Jacob Wackernagel, Lectures on Syntax: with special reference to Greek, Latin, and Germanic, edited and translated by David Langslow, New York: Oxford University Press, 2009 ISBN 978-0-19-815302-3 (original edition: 1920–1924).
- Jacob Wackernagel (2020). On a law of Indo-European word order: Über ein Gesetz der indogermanischen Wortstellung. Berlin: Language Science Press. doi:10.5281/zenodo.3978908. ISBN 978-3-96110-271-6.
