= Wilhelm Wackernagel =

German-Swiss philologist (1806–1869)

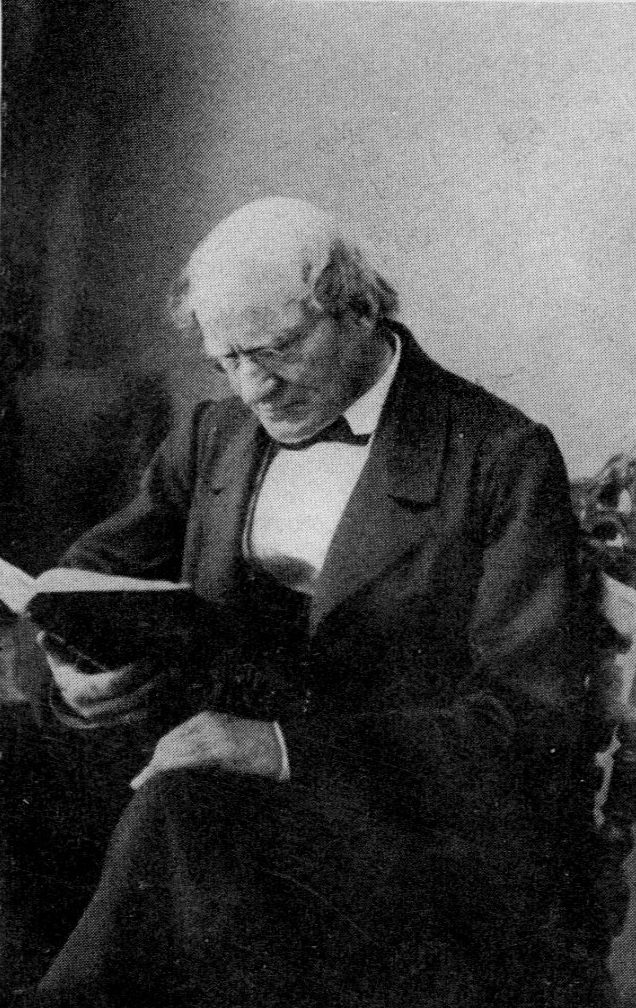
Wilhelm Wackernagel

Wilhelm Wackernagel (German: [ˈvakɐˌnaːɡl̩]; 23 April 1806, Berlin – 21 December 1869, Basel) was a German-Swiss philologist specializing in Germanic studies. He was the father of Indo-Europeanist Jacob Wackernagel.

Wackernagel studied Classical and Germanic literature at the University of Berlin as a pupil of August Boeckh and Karl Lachmann. In 1833, he moved to Basel, where from 1835 to 1869, he was a professor of German language and literature at the university. While at Basel, he turned down offers for professorships in Berlin, Munich, Tübingen, and Vienna.

== Works ==
He was considered the leading Germanist after the death of Jacob Grimm in 1863. A number of Wackernagel's significant works were published posthumously. The following are some of his principal writings:

- Geschichte des deutschen Hexameters und Pentameters bis auf Klopstock, 1831 – History of German hexameters and pentameters prior to Klopstock.
- Gedichte Walthers von der Vogelweide (edited with Karl Joseph Simrock) – Poetry of Walther von der Vogelweide.
- Deutsches Lesebuch, 1835–1843 (3 volumes) – German basal reader.
- Geschichte der deutschen Litteratur : ein Handbuch, 1848-1855 – History of German literature.
- Die deutsche glasmalerei: Geschichtlicher entwurf mit belegen, 1855 – German stained glass; historical design.
- Kleinere Schriften von Wilhelm Wackernagel, 1872 – Smaller writings.
- Poetik, Rhetorik und Stilistik: Academische Vorlesungen, 1873 (edited by Ludwig Sieber) – Poetics, rhetoric and stylistics; Academic lectures.
- Johann Fischart von Strassburg, 1874 – monograph on Johann Fischart.
- Altdeutsches handwörterbuch, 1878 (edited by Maximilian Rieger) – Old German dictionary.
- Kleineres altdeutsches Lesebuch, 1880 – Smaller Old German basal reader.
