= Kātyāyana =

Sanskrit grammarian, mathematician and Vedic priest

- Born: est. 3rd–4th century BCE; Deccan, Southern India

Academic work
- Era: Vedic period
- Main interests: Sanskrit grammarian, mathematician and Vedic priest
- Notable works: Vārttikakāra, Vyākarana, later Śulbasūtras

Kātyāyana (कात्यायन) also spelled as Katyayana (c. 3rd–4th century BCE) was a Sanskrit grammarian, mathematician and Vedic priest who lived in ancient India.

== Origins ==
According to some legends, he was born in the Katya lineage originating from Vishwamitra, thus called Katyayana.

The Kathāsaritsāgara mentions Kātyāyana as another name of Vararuci, a re-incarnation of Lord Shiva's gana or follower Pushpadanta. The story also mentions him learning grammar from Shiva's son Kartikeya which is corroborated in the Garuda Purana where Kartikeya (also called Kumara) teaches Katyayana the rules of grammar in a way that it could be understood even by children. It may be that his full name was in fact Vararuci Kātyāyana.

== Relation to Goddess Katyayini ==
In texts like Kalika Purana, it is mentioned that he worshipped Mother Goddess to be born as his daughter hence she came to be known as Katyayani or the "daughter of Katyayan" who is worshipped on the sixth day of Navratri festival. According to the Vamana Purana, the gods had gathered together to discuss the atrocities of the demon Mahishasura and their anger manifested itself in the form of energy rays. The rays crystallized in the hermitage of Kātyāyana Rishi, who gave it proper form, and therefore she is also called Katyayani.

== Works ==
He is known for two works:

- The Vārttikakāra, an elaboration on Pāṇini grammar. Along with the Mahābhāṣya of Patañjali, this text became a core part of the Vyākaraṇa (grammar) canon. This was one of the six Vedangas, and constituted compulsory education for students in the following twelve centuries.
- He also composed one of the later Śulbasūtras, a series of nine texts on the geometry of altar constructions, dealing with rectangles, right-sided triangles, rhombuses, etc. In this book he describes a method of finding true north, by measuring the shadow cast by a pole over the course of a day. An experiment using this method resulted in lines less than 1/10th of a degree off due east–west.

== Mathematics ==
=== Determination of the east–west line ===
The Kātyāyana Śulba-sūtra gives a method for finding the east–west direction by means of the shadow cast by a gnomon. A vertical stake was placed on level ground, and a circle was drawn around it with a cord fastened to the stake. The points at which the tip of the shadow of the stake reached the circumference of the circle were noted at two different times, one in the morning and one in the afternoon. The line joining these two points was regarded as the east–west line (prācī).

The method was then applied in order to find the north–south direction. A cord was tied to the two points that defined the east–west line and pulled taut at its middle point, first to one side and then to the other side. The two new positions thus obtained determined a line that was at right angles to the east–west line, thus giving the north–south direction. In modern geometric terms, this construction is equivalent to finding the perpendicular bisector of the east–west segment.

Kim Plofker points out that the early Śulba-sūtra texts contain no record of a known method for establishing the east–west baseline, whereas the later Kātyāyana-śulba-sūtra explicitly describes the gnomon-and-shadow procedure. She also observes that the diagram showing the construction in her book is a modern reconstruction; the Sanskrit text itself explains the procedure in words and not through a diagram.

== Views ==
Kātyāyana's views on the sentence-meaning connection tended towards naturalism. Kātyāyana believed, that the word-meaning relationship was not a result of human convention. For Kātyāyana, word-meaning relations were siddha, given to us, eternal. Though the object a word is referring to is non-eternal, the substance of its meaning, like a lump of gold used to make different ornaments, remains undistorted, and is therefore permanent.

Realizing that each word represented a categorization, he came up with the following conundrum (following Bimal Krishna Matilal):

"If the 'basis' for the use of the word 'cow' is cowhood (a universal) what would be the 'basis' for the use of the word 'cowhood'?

Clearly, this leads to infinite regress. Kātyāyana's solution to this was to restrict the universal category to that of the word itself — the basis for the use of any word is to be the very same word-universal itself."

This view may have been the nucleus of the Sphoṭa doctrine enunciated by Bhartṛhari in the 5th century, in which he elaborates the word-universal as the superposition of two structures — the meaning-universal or the semantic structure (artha-jāti) is superposed on the sound-universal or the phonological structure (śabda-jāti).

In the tradition of scholars like Pingala, Kātyāyana was also interested in mathematics. Here his text on the Śulbasūtras dealt with geometry, and extended the treatment of the Pythagorean theorem as first presented in 800 BCE by Baudhayana.

Kātyāyana belonged to the Aindra School of Grammar.
