= Siddhantakaumudi =

Sanskrit grammar book by Bhaṭṭoji Dīkṣita

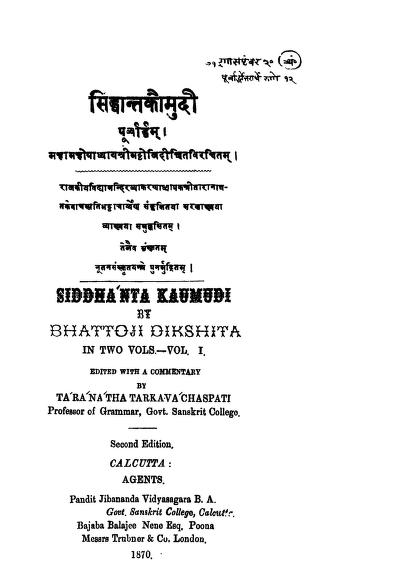
- Author: Bhattoji Diksita
- Publication date: 1870

Siddhantakaumudi (Siddhānta Kaumudī) is a book by Bhaṭṭoji Dīkṣita on Sanskrit grammar. Its full name Vaiyakaranasiddhantakaumudi. Bhattoji Dixit composed Siddhanta Kaumudi on the basis of Prakriyakaumudi. He himself wrote Praudha Manorama Tika on this book. Bhattoji dikshita's disciple Varadarāja also became a great scholar of grammar. He composed Laghusiddhantakaumudi.

In the ancient practice of studying Paṇiniyān grammar, the order of Paniniya sutrapath was considered as the basis. This sequence was difficult from the point of view of experiment, because formulas of different chapters had to be used to do the same experiment. Seeing this difficulty, there was a need to invent such a method in which all sutras necessary for the achievement of a particular experiment are available at one place.

As Western countries are being interested in Sanskrit, Siddhantakaumudi along with Astadhyayi and other books, are becoming widely researched.

== Contents of book ==
Siddhantakaumudi is more popular than Ashtadhyayi. The sutras of the Ashtadhyayi have been collected and explained under appropriate headings in permutations. Thus Siddhantakaumudi is more organized and can be easily understood.

Paniniyan sutras are defined such as

adeṅ guṇaḥ /1/1/2.(अदेङ् गुणः)

idaṃ hrasvasya akārasya ekāra-okārayośca guṇasañjñāvidhāyakam sūtram. asya sūtrasya vṛttiḥ evamasti, ad eṅ. ca guṇasaṃjñaḥ syāt.

This is the formula for the property noun of the short a, the ekara (e) and the okara (o). The instinct of this formula is as follows, a and eṅ pratyāhara. It would be a quality (guṇa) noun.

— Siddhantakaumudi

== Bibliography ==
- Siddhanta Kaumudi of Bhattoji Dikshita English Translation in 6 Volumes
- http://laghusiddhanta.vedicsociety.org/
- Vyakaransiddhantkaumudi with Hindi explanation (Google books; Hindi interpreter: Shridharanand Ghildiyal)
- Siddhanta Kaumudi Sanskrit & English Commentaries
- The Siddhanta kaumudi of Bhattoji Dikshita (1904)
- The Siddhanta kaumudi of Bhattoji Dikshita 4
- Vyakaranasiddhantakaumudi 4th part (Google books ; Giridharsharma Chaturved)
- Vyakaranasiddhantakaumudi: Hindi translation and explanation (Google books; Ramkaran Sharma)
