= Vyākaraṇa =

Study of linguistics in Sanskrit language

Vyākaraṇa (Sanskrit: व्याकरण, lit. 'explanation, analysis', IPA: [ˈʋjaːkɐrɐɳɐ]) refers to one of the six ancient Vedangas, ancillary sciences connected with the Vedas, which are scriptures in Hinduism. Vyākaraṇa is the study of grammar and linguistic analysis in the Sanskrit language.

Pāṇini and Yāska are the two celebrated ancient scholars of Vyākaraṇa; both are dated to several centuries prior to the start of the common era, with Pāṇini likely from the fifth century BCE. Pāṇini's Aṣṭādhyāyī is the most important surviving text of the Vyākaraṇa traditions. This text, as its very title suggests, consists of eight chapters, each divided into four padas, cumulatively containing 4000 sutras. The text is preceded by abbreviation rules grouping the phonemes of Sanskrit. Pāṇini quotes ten ancient authorities whose texts have not survived, but they are believed to have been Vyākaraṇa scholars.

Vyākaraṇa is related to the fourth Vedānga called Nirukta. Vyākaraṇa scholarship has dealt with linguistic analysis to establish the exact form of words to properly express ideas, and Nirukta scholarship has focused on linguistic analysis to help establish the proper meaning of the words in context.

== Etymology ==
Vyākaraṇa (IPA: [ʋjaːkɐrɐɳɐ]) means "separation, distinction, discrimination, analysis, explanation" of something. It also refers to one of the six Vedāngas, or the Vedic field of language analysis, specifically grammatical analysis, grammar, linguistic conventions which creates, polishes, helps a writer express and helps a reader discriminate accurate language.

The word Vyākaraṇa is also found in Mahayana sutras and first-millennium Mahayana Buddhist texts, but with a different meaning. Vyākaraṇa, in these Buddhist texts, means a prediction or prophecy by a Buddha to a Bodhisattva who has just embarked on the path, that he will achieve enlightenment and be a buddha, in other words, an enlightened one.

== History ==
Vyākaraṇa emerged as a distinct auxiliary field of Vedic study in ancient times. Its aim was to prevent sloppy usage and transmission of the Vedic knowledge, states Howard Coward – a professor emeritus at the University of Victoria and the founding editor of the Journal for Hindu-Christian Studies. Vyākaraṇa helped ensure that the Vedic scriptures of Hinduism and its message of "Sabda Brahman" (explanation of metaphysical truths through words) that Vedic Rishis had realized by their efforts, remains available to all in a pristine form. In Indian traditions, Vyākaraṇa has been one of the most important sciences, one extensively studied over its history, and that led to major treatises in the philosophy of language.

Pāṇini and Yāska, two celebrated ancient scholars of Vyākaraṇa, are both dated to several centuries prior to the start of the common era, likely the 5th-century BCE. However, both of them cite prior scholars and texts, which though lost to history, imply that the field of Vyākaraṇa was an established and developed science of language before them. Between the two, Yaksa may be the older one and more known for Nirukta (etymology) – the fourth auxiliary field of Vedic studies, but the evidence for him preceding Pāṇini is scanty and uncertain. In terms of dedicated treatise on Vyākaraṇa, Pāṇini is the most recognized ancient Hindu scholar, and his Aṣṭādhyāyī ("Eight Chapters") is the most studied extant ancient manuscript on Sanskrit grammar. Pāṇini's fame spread outside India, and the reverence for ancient Pāṇini in northwest India is mentioned in Chinese texts of Xuanzang – the 7th-century traveller and scholar.

The study of grammar and the structure of language is traceable to the Rigveda, or 2nd millennium BCE, in hymns attributed to sage Sakalya. (Note: In addition to explicit references to Vyākaraṇa, Rigveda has numerous embedded Riddle hymns, a few of which ancient and medieval Hindu scholars interpreted to be referring to linguistics and grammar. For example, the riddle verse 4.58.3 of the Rigveda states, "Four horns, three feet, two heads and seven hands he has. The bull is thrice bound and roars. Great is the god who has entered the man". – Rigveda 4.58.3 Patañjali interprets this riddle as follows, state Annette Wilke and Oliver Moebus: The four horns represent the four parts of speech: nouns, verbs, prefixes and particles. The three feet are the three main tenses: present, future, past; the two heads are the conventional and the etymological meaning of a word; the seven hands are the seven cases in Sanskrit; the three places where the roaring bull is bound are the three resonating spaces - the chest, the neck and the head' and the great god in riddle is the word.) Sakalya is acknowledged by Pāṇini's works. The literary evidence that the science of Vyākaraṇa existed in Vedic times abound in the Brahmanas, Aranyakas and Upanishads, states Moriz Winternitz. The extant manuscripts of Pāṇini and Yaksa suggest that the Vedic age had competing schools of grammar. One school, for example, held that all nouns have verbal roots, while another held that not all nouns have verbal roots. However, it is unclear how, who or when these ancient Vedic theories of grammar originated, because those texts have not survived into the modern era.

=== Pre-Pāṇinian schools ===
There were many schools of Sanskrit grammar in ancient India, all established before the mid 1st-millennium BCE. Pāṇini's Aṣṭādhyāyī, which eclipsed all other ancient schools of grammar, mentions the names of ten grammarians.). Some of these pre-Pāṇinian scholars mentioned by Pāṇini include Apisali, Kasyapa, Gargya, Galava, Cakravarmana, Bharadvaja, Sakatayana, Sakalya, Senaka and Sphoṭayāna.

The works of most these authors are lost but we find reference of their ideas in the commentaries and rebuttals by later authors. Yāska's Nirukta is one of the earlier surviving texts, and he mentions Śākaṭāyana, Krauṣṭuki, Gārgya among others.

=== Post-Pāṇinian schools ===
Pāṇini's Aṣṭādhyāyī is the most ancient extant manuscript on Vyākaraṇa. It is a complete and descriptive treatise on Sanskrit grammar in aphoristic sutras format. This text attracted a famous and one of the most ancient commentary (bhāṣya) called the Mahābhāṣya. The author of the Mahābhāṣya is named Patañjali, who may or may not be the same person as the one who authored Yogasutras. The Mahābhāṣya, or "Great Commentary", is more than a commentary on the Aṣṭādhyāyī, it is the earliest known philosophical text of the Hindu grammarians. (Note: The earliest secondary literature on the primary text of Pāṇini are by Kātyāyana (~3rd century BCE) and Patañjali (~2nd century BCE).) Non-Hindu texts and traditions on grammar emerged after Patañjali, some of which include the Sanskrit grammar by the Jain author Jainendra and the Cāndra grammar by the Buddhist Candragomin.

Patanjali's Great Grammatical Discourse [Vyakrana-Mahābhāṣya] is regarded as the classical model for academic texts. It is written with a great deal of didactic skill as a dialog in clear, simple Sanskrit, and contains many enlightening examples. One notices that the text follows in the tradition of instruction, similar to the dialog stye of the Western classics of antiquity.

— Annette Wilke and Oliver Moebus

Later Indian scholars simplified Pāṇini rules, and trimmed his compilation of sutras to essential 1,400 from comprehensive 4,000, eliminating those they felt were too difficult and complicated or those narrowly concerned with Vedic language. Non-Hindu traditions, such as Jainism and Buddhism, developed their own Vyākaraṇa literature, but all of them are dated to the 1st-millennium CE, all of them condensed Pāṇini, accepted and flowered largely from his theories of Vyākaraṇa.

The nature of grammar

The energy called word has the nature of an egg.
It develops in the form of an action, and
realizes itself as a sequence of parts.

— Bhartṛhari, Vākyapadīya 1.52
Translator: Tibor Kiss

The 5th-century Hindu scholar Bhartṛhari has been the next most influential Vyākaraṇa thinker, wherein he presented his philosophy of grammar and how language affects thoughts. (Note: Bhartṛhari is now dated to have lived no later than the 5th century CE, but there is a mention in a Chinese text by I-tsing that Bhartrihari died in 651/652 CE.) His theories on "philosophical problem of meaning", contained in the Vākyapadīya, has been unique, states Howard Coward. Bhartṛhari is considered to be a major architect of the "sphoṭa theory" of meaning, in the Hindu traditions.

Bhartṛhari ideas were widely studied, but challenged as well in the last half of the first millennium, particularly by the ritual-driven, Mīmāṃsā school of Hindu philosophy and by Dharmakirti of Buddhism. The Advaita Vedanta school of Hinduism defended the ideas of Bhartṛhari.

About the seventh century, the Kāśikāvṛttī co-authored by Jayaditya and Vamana, and the tenth century studies of Helaraja on Vyākaraṇa were the next major milestone. These Hindu texts were not only commented in Hindu tradition, but were the foundation of works of the Buddhist Jinendrabuddhi who is known for his grammar insights in Buddhist literature.

The most studied Vyākaraṇa scholars of early and mid-second millennium are Ksirasvamin, Haradatta, Maitreya Rakshita, and Kaiyata. The modern era Vyākaraṇa scholars have included Bhattoji Dikshita, Konda Bhatta and Nagesha Bhatta.

Between 1250 and 1450 Anubhūti Svarūpācārya created a simplified grammatical system called Sārasvatavyākaraṇa.

In the 14th century grammarian Padmanabhadatta, founder of the Supadma School, composed the Supadmavyākaraṇa. The text is based on Pāṇini's Ashtadhyayi, but remodeled and rearranged with explanatory notes. It is written in Bengali alphabet, making it accessible to the Bengal provinces by removing the complexity of Sanskrit grammar. The main objective of Padmanabhadatta was to make knowledge of Sanskrit grammar clear and simple and to Sanskritize the new words that developed in the language.

=== Location ===
In terms of the place of Vyākaraṇa scholarship over South Asian history, from ancient to 16th-century, Kashmir, Kerala, Nepal, Andhra Pradesh, Varanasi and Bengal have been influential, but the location of many Vyākaraṇa scholars is unknown.

== Texts ==
Pāṇini's text Aṣṭādhyāyī is in sutras format, has eight chapters, and cumulative total of 4,000 sutras. These rules are preceded by a list of fourteen groups of sounds, in three sections called the Shiva-sutra, Pratyahara-sutra and Maheshvara-sutra. The Aṣṭādhyāyī groups the rules of language, for clear expression and understanding, into two, the verbal (Dhatupatha) and the nominal bases (Ganapatha). The text consists of an analytical part covered in the first five chapters, and a synthetic part found in the last three chapters.

The Aṣṭādhyāyī manuscript has survived with sets of ancillary texts (appendices) whose dates of composition and authors are contested. The main text is notable for its details and systematic nature, syntactic functions and arranging the sutras in an algorithmic fashion where the grammar rules typically apply in the order of sutras.

The Aṣṭādhyāyī sutras were widely studied and a subject of the bhāṣya (review and commentary) tradition of Hinduism. The oldest emendation and commentary on the Aṣṭādhyāyī is attributed to Kātyāyana (~3rd century BCE), followed by the famous Mahābhāṣya of Patañjali (~2nd century BCE) which has survived into the modern age. Other commentaries on the Aṣṭādhyāyī likely existed, because they are cited by other Indian scholars, but these texts are believed to be lost to history.

=== Discussion ===
Pāṇini writes that the Anjna (popular usage of a word) is the superseding authority, and the theoretically derived meaning of a word must be discarded and instead superseded by that which is the popular usage. The artha (meaning) of a shabda (word) is established by popular usage at the time the text was composed, not by etymological theory nor historical usage nor later usage.

A sentence is a collection of words, a word is a collection of phonemes, states Pāṇini. The meaning of Vedic passages has to be understood through context, the purpose stated, keeping in mind the subject matter being discussed, what is stated, how, where and when.

The Aṣṭādhyāyī tradition of Sanskrit language, with some reservations, accepts the premise that all words have verbal roots, and that words are created by affixing fragments to these roots. However, Pāṇini asserts that it is impossible to derive all nouns from verbal roots.

The Aṣṭādhyāyī is primarily focussed on the study of words, how words are formed, and their correct architecture. However, it does not exclude syntax. Pāṇini includes the discussion of sentence structure. The text, state Howard and Raja, describes compound word formation based on syntactic and semantic considerations, such as in sutra 2.1.1.

==== Correct sentences ====
Pāṇini asserts that a proper sentence has a single purpose, and is formed from a group of words such that, on analysis, the separate words are found to be mutually expecting each other. A sentence, states Pāṇini, must have syntactic unity, which includes mutual expectancy (Ākankshā) of the words and phonetic contiguity (Sannidhi) of construction. Pāṇini adds semantic fitness (Yogyatā), but not tacitly. He accepts that a sentence can be grammatically correct even if it is semantically inappropriate or a deviant.

==== Words ====
The Aṣṭādhyāyī describes numerous usage of words, and how the meaning of a word is driven by overall context of the sentences and composition it is found in. The popular usage and meaning of a word at the time the text was composed supersedes the historical or etymologically derived meanings of that word. A word has the conventional meaning at the time the text was composed, but it is not so when it is quoted (cited or referred to) from another prior art text. In the latter case, the Sanskrit word is suffixed with iti (literally, thus), whereupon it means what the prior text meant it to be.

Yāska asserted that both the meaning and the etymology of words is always context dependent.

==== Syntax, verbs and words ====
Vyākaraṇa in the Hindu traditions has been a study of both the syntax structure of sentences, as well as the architecture of a word. For instance, Pāṇini asserts that grammar is about the means of semantically connecting a word with other words to express and understand meaning, and words are to be analyzed in the context they are used. Kātyāyana is quoted in Patañjali's Mahābhāṣya on Vyākaraṇa as asserting the nature of a sentence as follows:

A sentence consists of a finite verb together with indeclinables, karakas and qualifiers. – Mahābhāṣya 1.367.10
A sentence has one finite verb. – Mahābhāṣya 1.367.16

— Kātyāyana

Similarly, Sayana asserts the scope of Vyākaraṇa to be as follows:

Grammar [Vyākaraṇa] is that process by which division is carried out everywhere, by recognizing:
In this speech, so much is one sentence;
In this sentence then, so much is one word;
In this word then, this is the base and this is the suffix.

— Sayana

A word that is a verb is concerned with bhava (to become), while a noun is concerned with sattva (to be, reality as it is). Sattva and bhava are two aspects of the same existence seen from the static and dynamic points of view. Verbs according to Vyākaraṇa indicate action in a temporal sequence while nouns are static elements, states K Kunjunni Raja.

=== Patañjali's Mahābhāṣya ===
Patañjali's 2nd-century BCE Mahābhāṣya is another important ancient text in Vyākaraṇa scholarship. It is not a full commentary on everything Pāṇini wrote in Aṣṭādhyāyī, but it is more a commentary on Kātyāyana's text on grammar called Varttikas, as well as the ideas of Vyadi. While Kātyāyana's additions have survived, Vyadi have not.

The Kātyāyana's text reflects an admiration for Pāṇini, an analysis of his rules, their simplification and refinement. The differences between the grammar rules of Pāṇini and of Kātyāyana may be because of historical changes to Sanskrit language over the centuries, state Howard Coward and K Kunjunni Raja.

=== Bhartṛhari's Vākyapadīya ===
Language and spirituality

The word is subsumed by the sentence,
the sentence by the paragraph,
the paragraph by the chapter,
the chapter by the book,
and so on,
until all speech is identified with Brahman.

— Bhartṛhari

The Vākyapadīya of Bhartṛhari is a treatise on the philosophy of language, building on the insights of prior Vyākaraṇa scholarship.

According to Bhartṛhari, states Scharfstein, all thought and all knowledge are "words", every word has an outward expression and inward meaning. A word may have a definition in isolation but it has meaning only in the context of a sentence. Grammar is a basic science in the Hindu traditions, explains Scharfstein, where it is externally expressed as relations between words, but ultimately internally understood as reflecting relations between the different levels of reality. Word is considered a form of energy in this Hindu text, one with the potential to transform a latent mind and realize the soul. Language evolves to express the transient material world first, and thereon to express feelings, the human desire for meaning in life and the spiritual inner world.

=== Roots of words ===
In Yāska's time, nirukta "etymology" was in fact a school which gave information of formation of words, the etymological derivation of words. According to the nairuktas or "etymologists", all nouns are derived from a verbal root. Yāska defends this view and attributes it to Śākaṭāyana. While others believed that there are some words which are "Rudhi Words". 'Rudhi" means custom. Meaning they are a part of language due to custom, and a correspondence between the word and the thing if it be a noun or correspondence between an act and the word if it be a verb root. Such word can not be derived from verbal roots. Yāska also reports the view of Gārgya, who opposed Śākaṭāyana who held that certain nominal stems were 'atomic' and not to be derived from verbal roots

== Influence ==
The Vyākaraṇa texts have been highly influential on Hindu philosophies. The concept of a sentence (vakya) defined by Pāṇini, for instance, influenced and was similar to Jaimini, the later era founder of Mīmāṃsā school of Hindu philosophy. However, ritual-focussed Mimamsa school scholars were generally opposed to central ideas of the Hindu Grammarians, while others Hindu schools such as Vedanta championed them.

Pāṇini's work on Vyākaraṇa has been called by George Cardona as "one of the greatest monuments of human intelligence".
