= Munshiram Manoharlal =

Indian academic publishing company

- Status: Active
- Founded: 1952
- Founder: Manohar Lal Jain
- Country of origin: India
- Headquarters location: 54 Rani Jhansi Road, New Delhi 110 055, India
- Distribution: Worldwide
- Key people: Vikram Jain
- Nonfiction topics: Indology, Indian art, art history, archaeology, architecture, Indian medicine, medicinal plants, Ayurveda, music, dance, theatre, cinema, geography, travel, voyages, religion, philosophy, dictionaries, glossaries, handbooks, encyclopaedias, numismatics, philately, epigraphy, Indian history, sociology, anthropology, social studies, languages, literature, and linguistics
- Imprints: Sanctum Books; BookVistas.com
- No. of employees: 100+
- Official website: mrml.online

Munshiram Manoharlal Publishers Pvt. Ltd. (MRML) is an Indian publishing house based in New Delhi, India. Established in 1952 by Manohar Lal Jain, it is one of the oldest publishing houses in India.

== About ==
MRML publishes books on social sciences and humanities and has published over 3000 academic and scholarly publications in Indian art, art history, architecture, archaeology, history, culture, politics, numismatics, geography, travel, voyages, Indian law, Indian medicine, language, literature, linguistics, dictionaries, glossaries, handbooks, indices, music, dance, theatre, religion, philosophy, Buddhism, Hinduism, Islam, Jainism, Sufism, Sikhism, tantra, mysticism, yoga, Sanskrit literature, sociology, anthropology, and related subjects.

MRML co-publishes scholarly titles with governmental institutions and bodies such as the Indian Council of Philosophical Research (ICPR); Centre for Studies in Civilizations, which is world-renowned for the series of scholarly publications called the Project of History of Science, Philosophy and Culture (PHISPC); Indira Gandhi National Centre for the Arts (IGNCA); and Indian Council of Historical Research (ICHR). In addition, MRML publishes and reprints books in collaboration with university presses, independent publishers, scholars, and institutions around the world.

== History ==
Munshiram Manoharlal belongs to a family of publishers who were the pioneers in Indological publishing in India. The origins of the family business can be traced back to 1870 in Lahore where books were published under the name of the ancestral company which was founded by Mehar Chand Jain. He named it Meharchand Lachhmandas. Mehar Chand Jain, a respected literary figure, had translated the Guru Granth Sahib, the holy book of the Sikhs, into English. The British government in India decorated him for his work. The company slowly expanded and its publications were being sold at bookstores all over the country.

Meharchand Lachhmandas was the first to publish several classic, essential, and perennial texts in the field of Indology, and became a major Indological publisher with a long list of published titles. It had a vast collection of manuscripts and publications from around the world at its bookshops. Lahore was the centre of education at that time and the company's bookshops specialized in Indology. It flourished for three subsequent generations, i.e., Lachhman Das Jain, Munshi Ram Jain, and Manohar Lal Jain.

In 1947, just before the partition of India, the offices, press, bookstore, and residence were burned down in rioting. Fortunately, the women and children of the family had been evacuated earlier to Amritsar. Soon afterwards, Manohar Lal Jain was forced to flee to Amritsar to take refuge, and with the help of kind Muslim neighbours, he escaped safely across the border. The family was once again united, but with no business or assets.

After the partition of India, there was a split in the family business. Manohar Lal Jain separated from the parent company Meharchand Lachhmandas to set up his own bookselling and publishing company. In 1948, he sold the jewelry his wife had brought with her from Lahore, and with that money, steps were taken to re-establish the business. Since Manohar Lal Jain was a well-known publisher with an excellent reputation, it was not difficult for him to restart the business. His services to the literary world were recognized and the business flourished once again.

In 1952, Munshiram Manoharlal was founded as a bookselling and publishing company at Nai Sarak in Delhi. It soon gained popularity and respect and became a leading Indological publisher, bookseller, and library-supplier from India. Munshiram Manoharlal's publications, along with other publications from the Indian subcontinent, were now being marketed aggressively in the South Asian market and exported to countries all over the world.

Manohar Lal Jain died in 1988 due to cardiac arrest. Subsequently, MRML was run by his son, Ashok Jain and grandson, Vikram Jain. Ashok Jain died in 2021 and MRML is now owned by Vikram Jain.

== MRML Group of Companies ==
1. Munshiram Manoharlal Publishers Pvt. Ltd
2. Sanctum Books
3. BookVistas.com

== Bookstores ==
1. MRML's head-office, principal bookstore, and distribution centre is located at 54 Rani Jhansi Road, New Delhi-110055.
2. Sanctum Books: MRML's city showroom located at 68 Medical Association Road, Darya Ganj, New Delhi-110002.

== Publications ==
MRML's publications include:

- The Mahabharata of Krishna-Dwaipayana Vyasa, 12 volumes by Kisari Mohan Ganguli
- The Astadhyayi of Panini, 6 volumes by Rama Nath Sharma
- Yogavarttika of Vijnanabhiksu, 4 volumes by T. S. Rukmani
- Yogasūtrabhāṣyavivaraṇa of Ādi Śaṅkara, 2 volumes by T. S. Rukmani
- History of Science, Philosophy and Culture in Indian Civilization, General Editor: D.P. Chattopadhyaya; over 100 volumes published so far
- Manasara Series, 7 volumes by Prasanna Kumar Acharya
- Ananda K. Coomaraswamy Series
- A Source-book of Indian Archaeology, 3 volumes, edited by Frank Raymond Allchin and D. K. Chakrabarti
- Complete Works of Goswami Tulsidas, 6 volumes, translated into English by S.P. Bahadur
- Ramayana in Regional Languages Series, 3 volumes published so far, translated into English by Shanti Lal Nagar
- Calukya Architecture, 3 volumes by Gerard Foekema
- Concise History of Ancient India, 3 volumes by A.K. Majumdar
- New History of the Marathas, 3 volumes by Govind Sakharam Sardesai
- The Vedantasutras with the Sribhasya of Ramanujacarya, 3 volumes, translated into English by M.B. Varadaraja Aiyangar
- A History of Sufism in India, 2 volumes by S.A.A. Rizvi
- The Atharvaveda, The Samaveda, and the Yajurveda by Devi Chand
- The Rigveda, The Atharvaveda, The Samaveda, and the Yajurveda by Ralph T. H. Griffith
- Sangitaratnakara of Sarngadeva, 2 volumes published so far by R.K. Shringy and Prem Lata Sharma
- An Encyclopaedia of Indian Archaeology, 2 volumes, edited by A. Ghosh
- The Builders of Indian Philosophy Series, General Editor: R. Balasubramanian
- History of the Sikhs, 5 volumes by Hari Ram Gupta
- Ancient Indian Massage by Harish Johari
- The Coins of the Indian Sultanates by Stan Goron and J.P. Goenka
- Discourse in Early Buddhist Art: Visual Narratives of India by Vidya Dehejia
- Slaves of the Lord: The Path of the Tamil Saints by Vidya Dehejia
- The Buddha Image: Its Origin and Development by Y. Krishan
- Kriya-yoga: The Science of Life-force by Swami Nityanandna Giri
