= Attock Khurd =

Ancient city in Punjab, Pakistan

- City
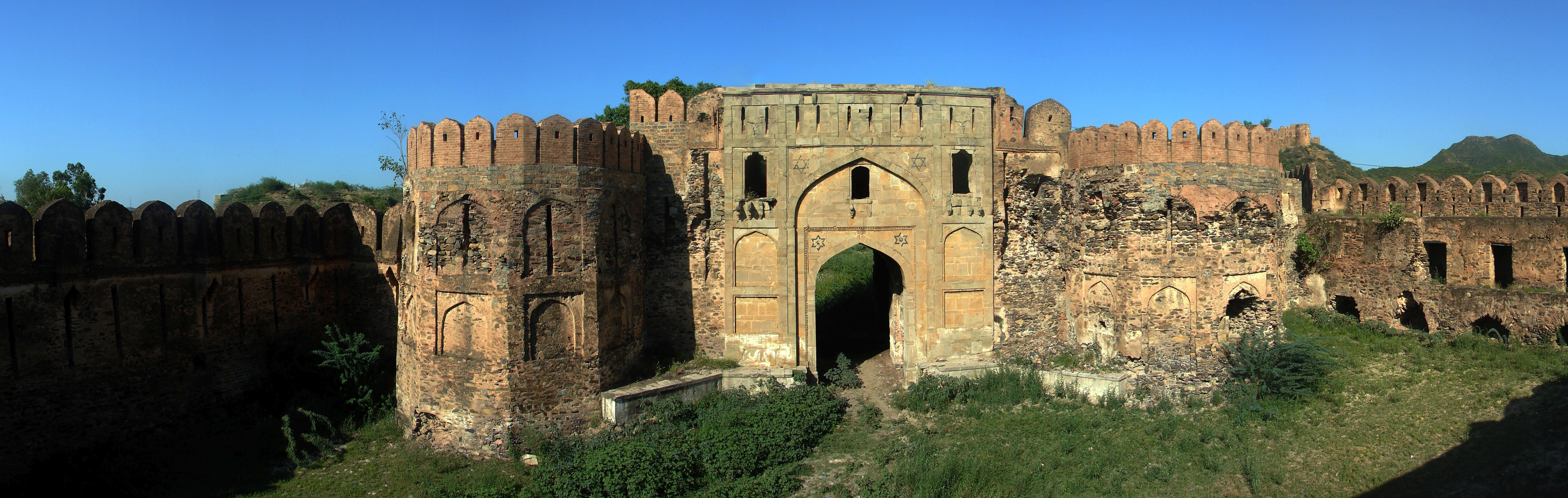
- View of Attock Fort

- Location within Pakistan
- Coordinates: 33°46′0″N 72°22′0″E
- Country: Pakistan
- Province: Punjab
- District: Attock
- Tehsil: Attock
- Time zone: UTC+5 (PST)

Attock Khurd (Punjabi, Urdu: اٹک خورد; lit. 'Little Attock') is a small town located beside the Indus River in the Attock District of Punjab Province in Pakistan.

== Etymology ==
Khurd and Kalan are Persian words, meaning small and big, respectively. The words are themselves derived from Middle Persian. When two villages have the same name in the same vicinity, they are often distinguished by adding the adjectives Kalan and Khurd with the villages' names.

== History ==
=== Ancient history ===
Attock Khurd (the old city) has a rich history and was of special importance to the entire Indian subcontinent. The great grammarian Pāṇini, who wrote the Aṣṭādhyāyī, the oldest surviving Sanskrit grammar, is said in some historical sources to have been born in 520 BCE near Attock in Salatura, modern Lahur, on the right bank of the Indus River in the ancient Kambojan/Gandharan territory. Attock was located on the high road, the Uttarapatha, the principal route of international commerce and communication between the sub-continent, Persia and Imperial China.

Attock appears in the history books during the rule of Chandragupta's grandson Ashoka, the Emperor of Upper India. He had converted to the Buddhist faith. The Edicts of Ashoka, set in stone, some of them written in Greek, declare that the Greek populations within his realm also had converted to Buddhism:

"Here in the king's domain among the Greeks, the Kambojas, the Nabhakas, the Nabhapamkits, the Bhojas, the Pitinikas, the Andhras and the Palidas, everywhere people are following Beloved-of-the-Gods' instructions in Dharma."

—Rock Edict Nb13 (S. Dhammika).

In the spring of 326 BCE, Alexander III of Macedon passed into Punjab (at Ohind, 16 m. above Attock) using a bridge over the Indus constructed by Perdiccas and Hephaestion. The region became part of the Kingdom of Ederatides the Greek or Indo-Greek Kingdom, which extended its power over western Punjab. The Indo-Greek kings held the country after him (until about 80 BCE) until its invasion by the Indo-Scythians.

=== Middle Ages ===
When the Chinese pilgrim Hiuen Tsang visited the district in 630 CE, and again in 643 CE, Buddhism was rapidly declining. The Brahman revival, to which India owes its present form of Hinduism, was already underway in the early years of the fifth century and must have been at its height at the time of Hiuen Tsang.

The country was under the rule of the kings of Kashmir and remained so until the end of the ninth century. After that, the district became part of the kingdom of the rulers of Kabul – and the town, then known as Udhabandhapur or Waihind, was their capital until 1001 when the capital was moved to Nandana in the Salt Range after the Battle of Peshawar (1001). Samanta Deva and his successors (more accurately designated as the "Hindu Shahis of Kabul"), remained in possession until the time of Mahmud Ghaznavi. The Gakhars became vital in the hills to the east, but their dominion never extended beyond the Margalla pass and the Khari However, it was again regained in 1400 by Sultan Sikandar and continued under Kashmiri rule until the conquest of Babur.

=== Early Modern Period ===
Akbar the Great built Attock Fort to protect the passage of the Indus, between 1581 and 1583 under the supervision of Khawaja Shamsuddin Khawafi. It was ruled by the Nawab of Punjab until 1754 and then captured by the Durrani Empire. Attock was won by Marathas, led by Raghunathrao and Sidhojiraje, in 1758. However, this conquest was short-lived. The Nawab of Punjab again captured Attock Khurd, followed by Ahmad Shah Durrani's conquest under a treaty with the Nawab, according to which Attock Khurd was divided between the Afghans and the Nawab.

Attock Khurd saw countless battles and skirmishes between the Sikhs and the Afghans in later years.

=== Late Modern Period ===
In 1813, the Sikh Empire wrested Attock Fort from the Durranis in the Battle of Attock and the Nawab of Punjab through the "Treaty of Misls". Attock Fort secured the passage of Afghans to and from Kashmir. In 1833. Hari Singh Nalwa, the commander-in-chief of the Sikh Empire's army along its border with the Kingdom of Kabul, strengthened Akbar's fort of Attock by building very high and massive bastions at each of its gates. As a result of the First Anglo-Sikh War (1845–1846), the fort was surrendered to the British. It was briefly lost to the Sikhs during the Second Anglo-Sikh War (1848–1849) but recaptured towards the end.

=== Sufis and saints ===
- Syed Sadaruddin Bhaakri, known as Sakhi Sultan Bhaakri, maternal uncle of Syed Imam Jafer Shah Bukhari
- Sayyid Imam Jafer Shah Bukhari-ul-Naqvi
- Syed Chakar Shah Bukhari (titled Dewan of Attock), great-grandson of Makhdoom Jahaniyan Jahangasht
- Syed Ahmad Sultan
- Muhammad Al-Makki
- Shah Esa Bhakri

== Transportation ==
The Attock Khurd railway station is situated near Old Attock Bridge on the main railway line. The railway station was built around 1885 during British rule. As of March 2007, it has been renovated and declared a tourist resort.

The station is the gateway to Attock Bridge. All trains running between Rawalpindi and Peshawar pass through this station without stopping here.
