= K. T. S. Sarao =

Indian historian and professor (born 1955)

K.T.S. Sarao
- Born: 1 April 1955 (age 71); Sangrur, Punjab, India
- Education: University of Delhi; University of Cambridge (PhD)
- Occupations: Historian, Writer
- Known for: Buddhism, Indology, Indian philosophy
- Awards: Doctor of Literature (honoris causa) by Central University of Punjab, Doctor of Letters (honoris causa) by Preah Sihanouk Raja Buddhist University, Vesak Citation of Honour by the Govt of India (2020), President of India’s Certificate of Honour (Independence Day Honour: 2018), Prime Minister of India’s Cane of Honour for being the Best All India NCC (National Cadet Corps) Cadet (Republic Day Honour: 1977)

Karam Tej Singh Sarao (born 1 April 1955) is an Indian historian and the former head and professor of Buddhist Studies at the University of Delhi. Presently, he holds the Shanghai Cooperation Organisation (SCO) Chair Professorship on Shared Buddhist Heritage at Nālandā University. He has been a visiting professor/fellow at Dongguk University, Chung-Hwa Institute of Buddhist Studies, Preah Sihanouk Raja Buddhist University, St Edmund's College, Cambridge, Maison des Sciences de L'Homme, University of Toronto, and Visva-Bharati University.

== Early life, family and education ==
He was born in village Chatha Gobindpura, Sangrur and received his high school certificate from Khanauri High School. Later, after having attended D.A.V. College, Chandigarh for one year, he went to Delhi University from where he obtained a bachelor's honours degree in history with economics, a first-class-first master’s in history, and a PhD in Buddhism. In 1985, he went to Cambridge University as a Commonwealth scholar and received his second doctorate in Pāli and archaeology under the supervision of Raymond Allchin and K. R. Norman in 1989. Between the years 1981 and 1993, he also worked part-time for India’s Ministry of Defence as National Cadet Corps officer in the rank of captain.

== Bibliography ==
=== Books ===
- Baku's Temple of Eternal Fire (Its Connections to Baba Nanak and the Udasi Sadhus). Bloomsbury Publishing. 28 August 2021. ISBN 978-93-543-5098-6.
- The History of Mahabodhi Temple at Bodh Gaya. Springer Nature. 2020. ISBN 978-981-15-8067-3.
- Buddhism and Jainism (Encyclopedia of Indian Religions). Springer Netherlands. 31 March 2017. ISBN 978-94-024-0853-9.
- The Dhammapada: A Translator's Guide. Munshiram Manoharlal Publishers. 2009. ISBN 978-81-215-1201-5.
- The Decline of Buddhism in India: A Fresh Perspective. Munshirm Manoharlal Publishers. 2012. ISBN 978-81-215-1241-1.
- Urban Centres and Urbanisation: As Reflected in the Pāli Vinaya and Sutta Piṭakas. Munshiram Manoharlal Publishers. 19 February 2010. ISBN 978-81-215-1209-1.
- Origin and Nature of Ancient Indian Buddhism. Eastern Book Linkers. 2010. ISBN 978-81-215-1222-0.
- Pilgrimage to Kailash: The Indian Route. Aryan Books International. 2009. ISBN 978-81-7305-368-9.
- A Text Book of the History of Theravāda Buddhism. Department of Buddhist Studies, University of Delhi. 1995.
- Kailāśa-Mānasarovara tīrthayātrā Bhāratīya mārga. Vidyanidhi Prakasana. 2010. ISBN 978-93-806-5116-3.

=== Journals ===
- Sarao, K. T. S. (2022). "Contacts between Ancient India and Southeast Asia". In D.K. Chakrabarti (ed.). History of Ancient India: Ancient India's Interrelations with the World. Vol. XI. pp. 1–39. ISBN 978-81-7305-490-7.
- Sarao, K. T. S. (2023). "The Buddha and His Dhamma: A Critical Look at Ambedkar's Magnum Opus as the Sacred Text of Navayāna– Buddhism of the Broken Men". The Maha Bodhi. 132 (1): 104–115. ISSN 0025-0406.
- Sarao, K. T. S. (2023). "Kāliṅgaraṭṭha and its Buddhist Connections". The Indian International Journal of Buddhist Studies. 22: 127–142. ISSN 0972-4893.
- Sarao, K. T. S. (2024). "Kapilavastu: Is it India's Piprahwā or Nepal's Tilaurākoṭ". Dharmadoot. 4: 1–23. ISSN 2347-3428.
- Sarao, K. T. S. (2024). "Archaeology of Indian Buddhism". Thilo Rehren and Efthymia Nikita (Eds.), Encyclopedia of Archaeology. 4: 344–349. ISBN 9780323907996.
- Sarao, K. T. S. (2017). "Buddhist-Muslim Encounter in Sind During the Eighth Century". Bulletin of the Deccan College Post-Graduate and Research Institute. 77: 75–94. ISSN 0045-9801. JSTOR 26609161.
- Sarao, K.T. S. (2008). "Buddhist Attitude towards Meat-Eating". The Tibet Journal. 33 (2): 91–98. ISSN 0970-5368. JSTOR 43301036.
- Sarao, K.T.S. (1 January 2003). "The Ācariyaparamparā and Date of the Buddha". Indian Historical Review. 30 (1–2): 1–12. doi:10.1177/037698360303000201. ISSN 0376-9836. S2CID 141897826.
- Sarao, K.T.S. (January–March 2015). "The Dalai Lama: Person and the Institution" (PDF). Dialogue, A Journal of Astha Bharati, New Delhi. 16 (3): 71–85. ISSN 0973-0095.
- Sarao, K.T.S. (1990). "Iron, urbanization and Buddhism". Archìv Orientálnì, Oriental Institute, Praha. 58 (2): 102–124. ISSN 0044-8699.
- Sarao, K.T.S. (2003). "Vasubandhu". Internet Encyclopedia of Philosophy. James Fieser and Bradley Dowden (gen. eds.).
- Sarao, K.T.S. (2013). "Anātman". Oxford Bibliographies, Oxford University Press, New York. doi:10.1093/OBO/9780195393521-0193. ISBN 978-0-19-539352-1.
- Sarao, K.T.S. (2020). "Gurū Nānak (1469-1539)". Bloomsbury Encyclopedia of Philosophers, London: Bloomsbury Academic. doi:10.5040/9781350993785.005. ISBN 9781350993785. S2CID 229605985.
- Sarao, K.T.S. (2020). "Śrī Chand (1494-c.1629)". Bloomsbury Encyclopedia of Philosophers, London: Bloomsbury Academic. doi:10.5040/9781350993785.009. ISBN 9781350993785. S2CID 229644433.

== See also ==
- Romila Thapar
