= Ihtisab March =

2016 protest in Pakistan

Ihtisab March (Urdu: احتساب مارچ, romanized: Iḥtisāb Mārch) was a protest march led by Imran Khan of the Pakistan Tehreek-e-Insaf against prime minister Nawaz Sharif. The march was in response to the Panama Papers in 2016 and PTI organized it over the claims of corruption of the Sharif family. The march began on 7 August 2016 from Peshawar until it was called off on 1 November 2016.

== Background ==
The Panama Papers revealed offshore holdings of former Prime Minister of Pakistan Nawaz Sharif's children. The expose, published by International Consortium of Investigative Journalists, Imran Khan and his party demanded Sharif's resignation. In many of his interviews and speeches, Khan stated that Sharif had lost the moral authority to run the government. The opposition demanded that the National Accountability Bureau, Federal Investigation Agency, and the Election Commission of Pakistan investigate Sharif for disqualification. The Government's inaction led the PTI to organise rallies and demonstrations across Pakistan.

== Protests ==
On 31 July 2016, in a press conference, Khan said that the country would have to make a choice between a "corrupt government" and "strong democracy". He hinted at starting a march against the Prime Minister. "The march will be a defining moment in the history of Pakistan," he said. However, the protest continued for weeks in several cities.

=== Peshawar protest ===
On Sunday, 7 August 2016, PTI held the first Ehtesab rally kicking off from Peshawar and culminating at Attock Bridge. However, when they reached Kohat, protesters belonging to PML-N began burning tyres on roads at four points. They came face to face with participants of the PTI rally, compelling Khan's supporters to change their route.

=== Islamabad ===
On, 13 August 2016 the PTI-led crowd gathered to protest against the Government. Khan urged the Supreme Court to take notice of the revelations regarding the offshore wealth of the ruling family. PML-N leaders later criticised Khan and said that the small crowd showed that Khan was losing support.

=== Jhelum by-election ===
The Election Commission of Pakistan barred Imran Khan from holding a rally in Jhelum due to the by-election scheduled to be held on 31 August 2016. But Khan did not follow the instructions and attended the jalsa. A huge number of people gathered to welcome Imran Khan, who heavily criticised PML-N and the Election Commission of Pakistan for its bias towards the PML-N Government. Despite defeat in the elections, the huge number of votes cast for the PTI candidate geared PTI for further rallies.

=== Lahore rally ===
On 30 August 2016, PTI invited Pakistan Peoples Party, which it had endlessly criticised over the alleged corruption scandals, to attend the Ehtesab rally. Moreover, Khan again demanded the PM’s resignation. Khan also asked FBR and NAB to take notice of the Panama papers and take action against the ruling PML-N. On the same day, Muhammad Tahir-ul-Qadri, a scholar of Sufism, along with outspoken politician Shaikh Rasheed Ahmad, held a rally called Qasas Rally in Rawalpindi. Crowds gathered in Lahore and Rawalpindi and there were reports of two deaths due to the protests and road blockages. Pervaiz Rashid, the Information Minister, lashed out at PTI for its politics and blamed PTI for causing a huge loss to the economy. Along with the street movement, PTI filed references against Sharif in the ECP and office of the Speaker of the National Assembly. The party also submitted a petition to the Supreme Court, which was rejected on 30 August 2016.
