= P. C. Roy =

P. C. Roy may refer to:

- Pratap Chandra Roy (1842–1895), Indian bookseller who published the first English translation of the Mahabharata, by Kisari Mohan Ganguli
- Prafulla Chandra Ray (1861–1944), Indian chemist and historian, whose name was sometimes also spelled as Roy
