= Salatura =

Ancient settlement in Pakistan

Śalātura
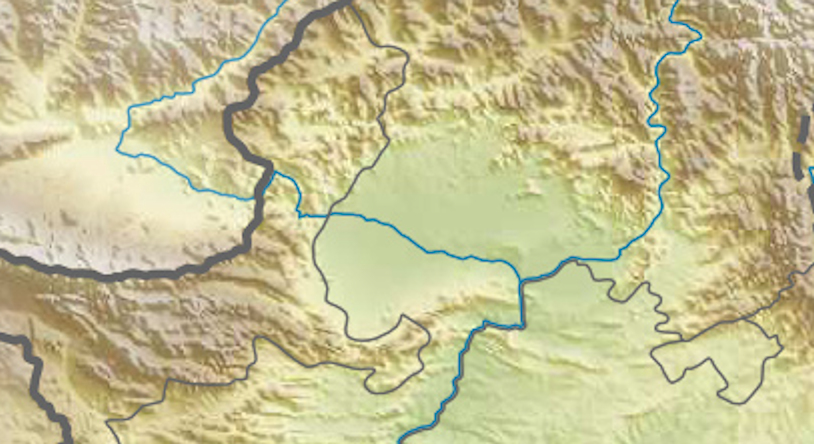
- Location within Pakistan Location within Gandhara Location within Khyber Pakhtunkhwa
- Coordinates: 34°2′54.5″N 72°21′56.1″E
- Country: Pakistan
- Province: Khyber-Pakhtunkhwa
- District: Swabi
- Elevation: 308 m (1,010 ft)
- Time zone: UTC+5 (PST)
- Number of Union councils: 2

Śalātura was the birthplace of ancient Indian Sanskrit grammarian Pāṇini, regarded as the earliest known grammarian whose work has survived into modern times. In an inscription by Siladitya VII of Valabhi, Pāṇini is referred to as Śalāturiya, meaning "man from Śalātura". This suggests that Pāṇini lived in Śalātura, an ancient city in Gandhara, likely near modern-day Lahor, Pakistan, a small town situated at the confluence of Indus and Kabul Rivers in the Swabi district of Khyber-Pakhtunkhwa, 20 miles northwest of the Attock Bridge.

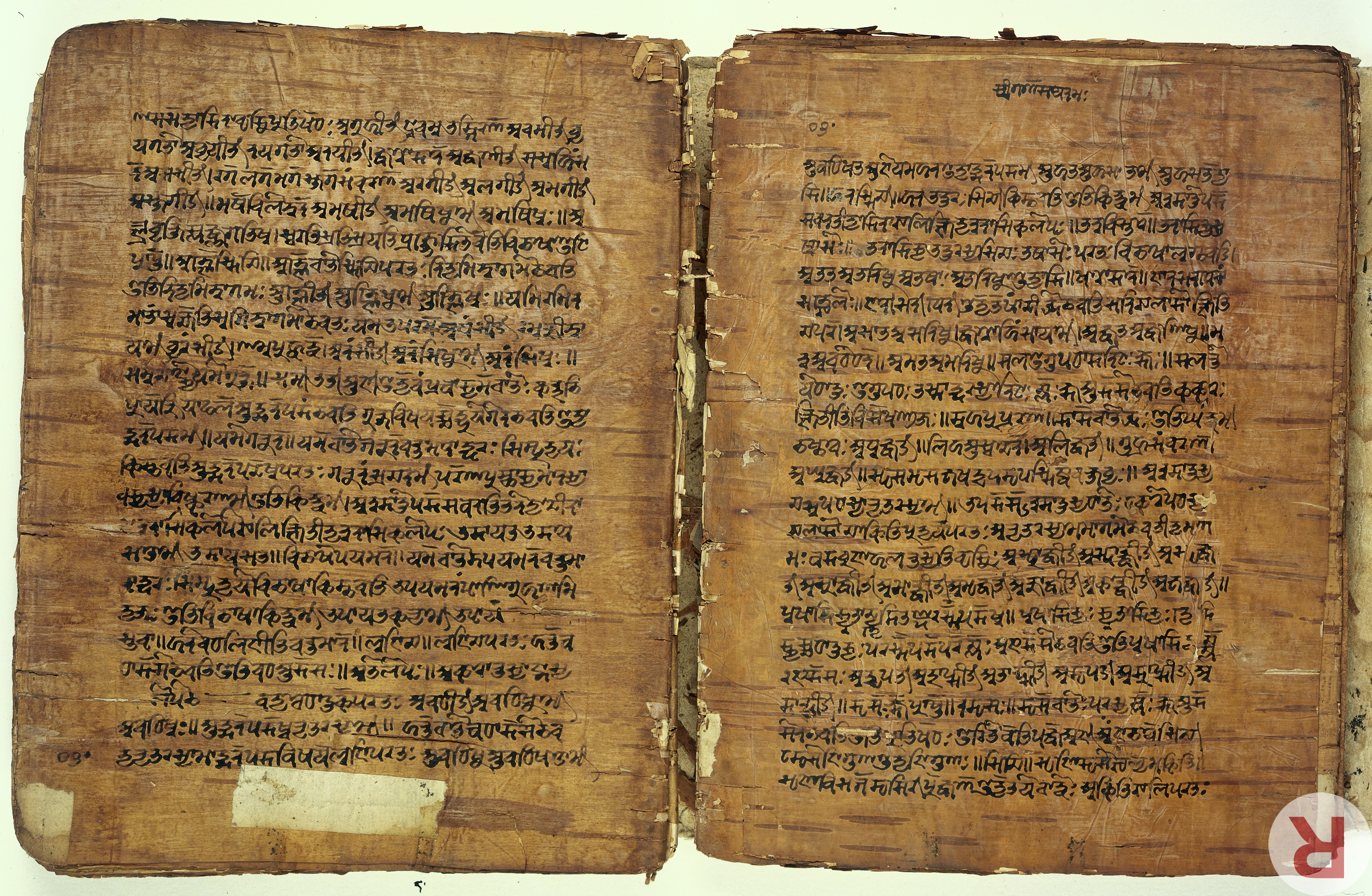
A 17th-century birch bark manuscript of a text based on Pāṇini's grammar from Kashmir

According to the CE 646 book Great Tang Records on the Western Regions (大唐西域記) of 7th-century Chinese scholar Xuanzang, there was a town called Suoluoduluo on the Indus where Pāṇini was born, and he composed the Qingming-lun (Sanskrit: Vyākaraṇa). He mentioned that a statue of Panini was in existence there.

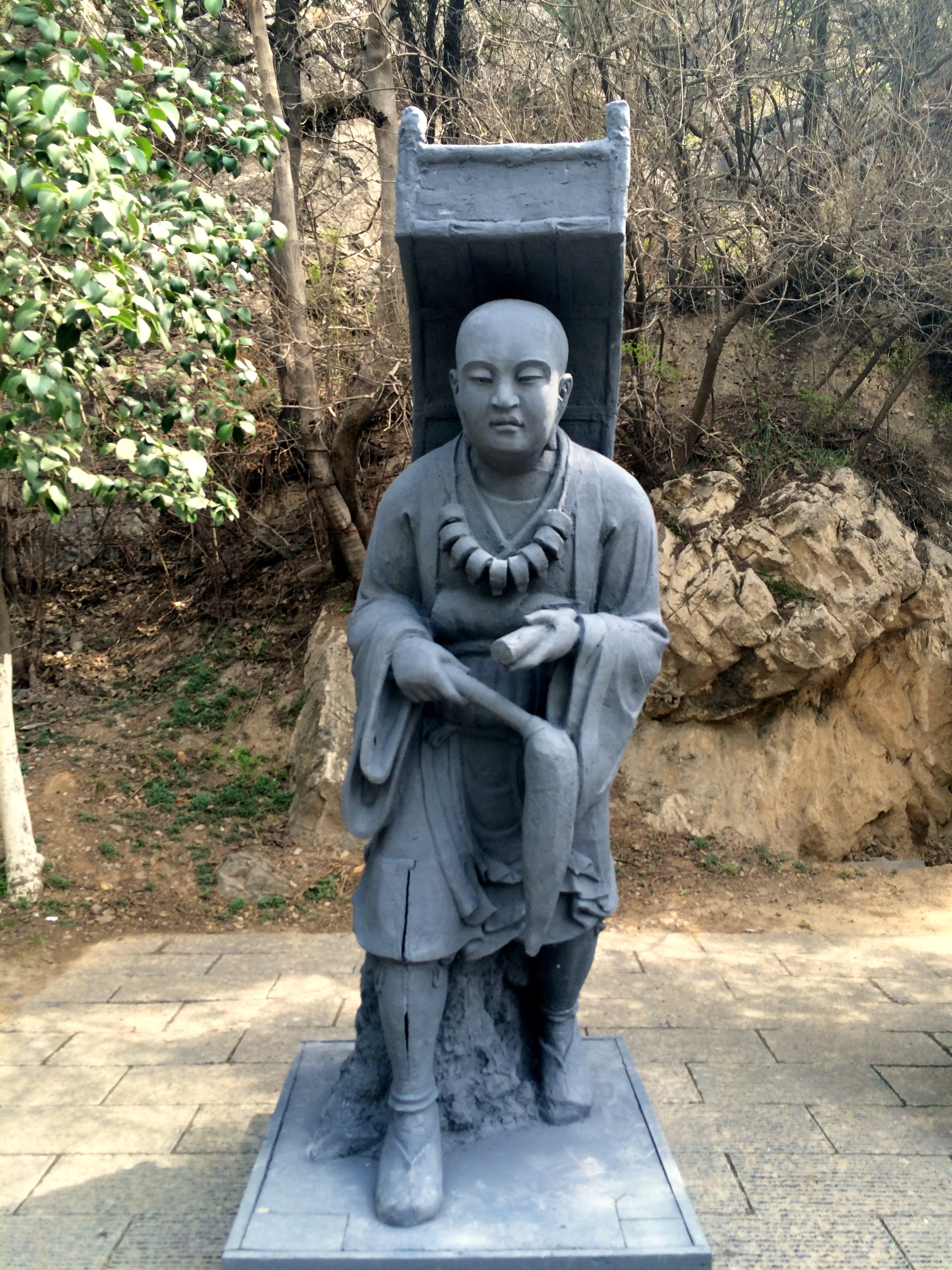
Xuan Zang Statue at Longmen Grottoes, Luoyang, China

Within the city of F'o (or Sha)-lo-tu-lo was a tope where an arhat had converted a disciple of Panini. Five hundred years after the Buddha's decease a great arhat from Kashmir in his travels as an apostle arrived at this place. Here he saw a brahmin teacher chastising a young pupil : in reply to the arhat's question the teacher said he beat the boy for not making progress in etymology. The arhat smiled pleasantly and in explanation said — You must have heard of the treatise on Etymology made by the rishi Panini and given by him to the world for its instruction. The brahmin replied— "He was a native of this city; his disciples admire his excellences, and his image is still here". To this the arhat answered — This boy of yours is that rishi. He added that in his previous existence Panini had devoted all his energies to worldly learning but that from some good Karma he was now the teacher's son.

Panini describes in great detail the local accents used for the names of wells north and south of Vipasha (modern Beas) river. He also mentions the Yavanas, which is taken to be Greeks (Ionians).

Prof. Ahmad Hasan Dani, the late Pakistani Sanskritist stated in a letter that the village has shifted and the old village was 3km to the west of the main road, where there was a big mound in ancient times. The mound has since been levelled down.

== Region ==
The region is well known for ancient remains. The Bakhshali manuscript was found in nearby Bakhshali which is 23 miles. The route passes through Shahbaz Garhi which has an Ashokan inscription.

Nearby was the Udhabandhapur or Waihind, the Shahi capital until 1001, which is about 18 miles

The language Panini has described came to be regarded as the standard Sanskrit, Panini himself did not use the term. The Kaushitaki Brahmana states that “In the northern direction a more mature language is being spoken. Therefore, people go to the north to learn speech or they desire to listen to him who comes from that direction”.

According to the scholars, Panini was primarily concerned with the north-western dialect of Sanskrit spoken during his period and secondarily with the Vedic language, he did mention other dialects which were spoken in the neighboring regions.

== See also ==
- Bakhshali manuscript
- Attock Khurd
- Pushkalavati
- Taxila
- Hund
