= Pratishakhyas =

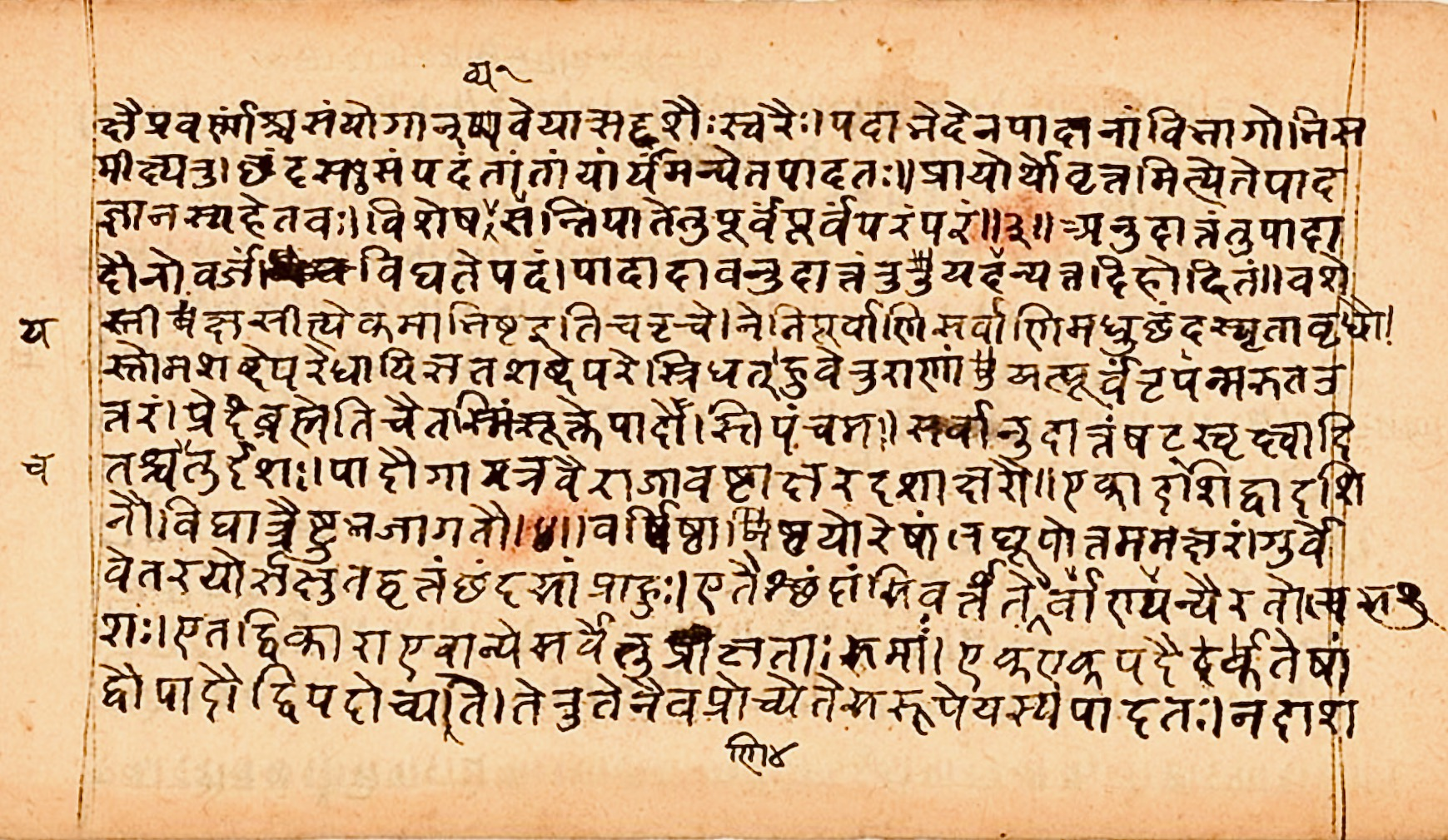
Dasatayi Pratisakhya of Saunakacharya, related to the Rigveda (Schoyen Collection Norway).

Pratishakhya (Sanskrit: प्रातिशाख्य prātiśākhya), also known as Parsada (pārṣada), are Vedic-era manuals devoted to the precise and consistent pronunciation of words. These works were critical to the preservation of the Vedic texts, as well as the accurate ritual recitations and analyses of the Vedas, particularly when isolated words interact after they have been joined in sandhi procedures. Each Vedic school (parisad, or parsad) and geographic branch (sakha) developed their own manuals, explaining why they have come to be called parsada or pratisakhya.

The manuals are parts of the Shiksha Vedanga: works dealing with the phonetic aspects of the Sanskrit language used in the Vedas. Each Veda has a pratishakhya for each school. Many pratishakhyas have survived into the modern age, and, according to Hartmut Scharfe, all except one (Taittiriya pratisakhya) are based upon "recitation of isolated words". Pratishakhyas begin with word-for-word recitation, and then supply rules for the continuous recitation of texts. Though all the manuals have the same basic goal, they differ significantly in how each achieves that goal. They were composed centuries before the work of Pāṇini, but there is evidence in these manuals that many pratisakhya evolved and were revised over time by the respective school to their regional preferences. The few manuscripts of the pratisakhyas that have survived into the modern era are likely from the 500 to 150 BCE period. The phonetic aspects of Vajasaneyi Pratisakhya is closest to those found in the classic Sanskrit grammar work of Pāṇini.

== Rig Veda ==
One of the Pratishakhyas treats of the phonetic aspects of the Rig Veda. The work is generally ascribed to Shaunaka, an ancient rishi (sage). It has been translated into German by Max Müller. A French translation done by M. Regnier is also available, as is an English translation by Mangal Deva Shastri.

== Yajur Veda ==
There are two treatises dealing with phonetic and related aspects of the Yajur Veda. The first, commonly known as the Krishna (Black) Yajur Veda, is known as Taittriya Pratisakhya. Its English translation done by Professor Whitney is also available, and the same has been published in the Journal of the American Oriental Society. The second treatise is commonly called the Shukla (White) Yajur Veda, and is known as Vajasaneyi Pratisakhya. The later is believed to have been written by Katyayana. Its translation done by Weber is available.

== Atharva Veda ==
The treatise pertaining to the phonetic and other aspects of Atharva Veda is also ascribed to the sage Saunaka, and derives its name from him: the Saunakiya Chaturadhyayika, which means the Book having four chapters by Saunak. Whitney has translated the work into English.

== Sama Veda ==
The name of the pratisakhya belonging to Sama Veda is Rk Tantra. Most of the mantras in Sama Veda are either from the Rk Veda or adapted from it, though sung differently. Hence the name Rk Tantra.

A critical edition of a Samaveda pratisakhya was published by Surya Kanta Shastri in 1933.

== See also ==
- Shiksha
