= Shiksha =

Vedic era study of phonetics and phonology, one of six Vedangas

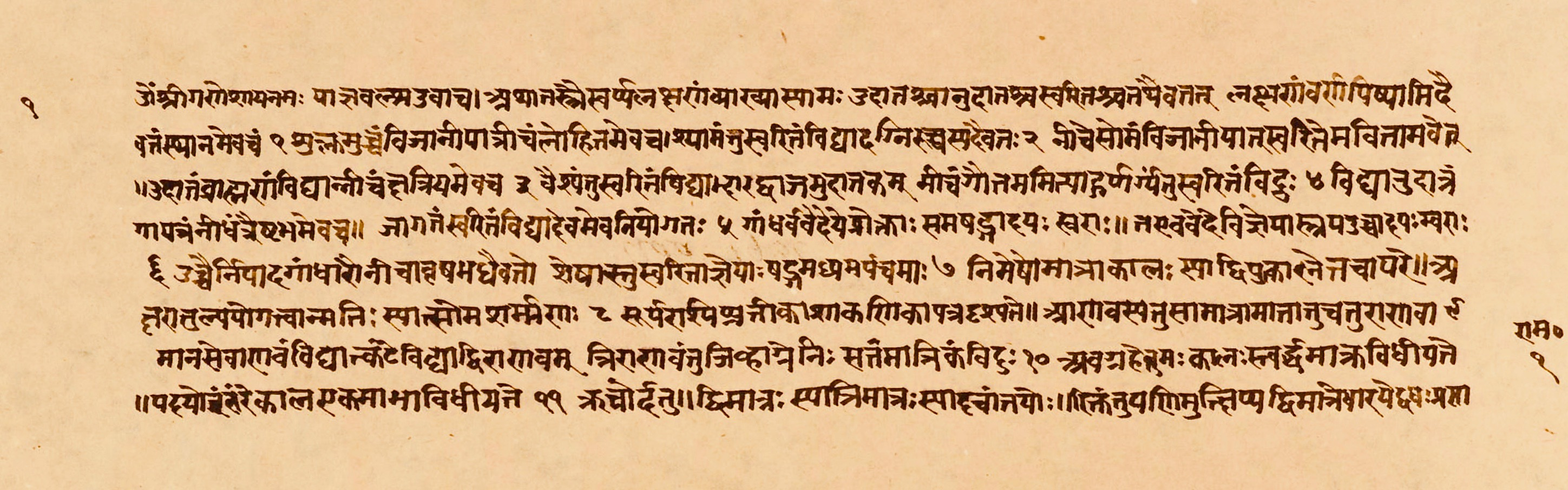
A page from the Yajnavalkya Shiksha manuscript (Sanskrit, Devanagari). This text is also called Vajasaneyi Shiksha and Traisvarya Lakshana.

Shiksha is one of the six Vedangas, or limbs of Vedic studies, dealing with phonetics and phonology in Sanskrit. The Sanskrit word IAST: śikṣā (Sanskrit: शिक्षा) means 'instruction, lesson, learning, study of skill'. Practitioners studied the letters of the Sanskrit alphabet, accent, quantity, stress, melody and rules of euphonic combination of words during a Vedic recitation.

Shiksha is the oldest and the first auxiliary discipline to the Vedas, maintained since the Vedic era. It aims at construction of sound and language for synthesis of ideas, in contrast to grammarians who developed rules for language deconstruction and understanding of ideas. This field helped preserve the Vedas and the Upanishads as the canons of Hinduism since the ancient times, and shared by various Hindu traditions.

Each ancient Vedic school developed this field of Vedanga, and the oldest surviving phonetic textbooks are the Pratishakyas. The Paniniya-Shiksha and Naradiya-Shiksha are examples of extant ancient manuscripts of this field of Vedic studies.

== Etymology ==
Shiksha literally means "instruction, lesson, study, knowledge, learning, study of skill, training in an art". It also refers to one of the six Vedangas, which studies sound, Sanskrit phonetics, laws of euphonic combination (sandhi), and the science of making language pleasant and understood without mistakes. Shiksha as a supplemental branch of the Vedas, included teaching proper articulation and pronunciation of Vedic texts. It was one of six fields of supplemental studies, others being grammar (Vyakarana), prosody (Chandas), ritual (Kalpa), etymology (Nirukta) and astrology (Jyotisha, calculating favorable time for rituals).

The roots of Shiksha can be traced to the Rigveda which dedicates two hymns 10.125 and 10.71 to revere sound as a goddess, and links the development of thought to the development of speech. The mid 1st-millennium BCE text Taittiriya Upanishad contains one of the earliest description of Shiksha as follows,

ॐ शीक्षां व्याख्यास्यामः ।
वर्णः स्वरः । मात्रा बलम् ।
साम सन्तानः । इत्युक्तः शीक्षाध्यायः ॥ १ ॥

Om! We will explain the Shiksha.
Sounds and accentuation, Quantity (of vowels) and the expression (of consonants),
Balancing (Saman) and connection (of sounds), So much about the study of Shiksha. || 1 ||

— Taittiriya Upanishad 1.2, Shikshavalli, Translated by Paul Deussen

Annette Wilke and Oliver Moebus date the Shiksha text of the Taittiriya Vedic school to be from 600 BCE at the latest. Texts such as this established, among other things, a rational order of the Sanskrit alphabet, state Wilke and Moebus. Other texts, such as Vyasa-Siksa of the Krishna Yajurveda, were composed later.

The ancient Vedic schools developed major treatises analyzing sound, vowels and consonants, rules of combination and pronunciation to assist clear understanding, to avoid mistakes and for resonance (pleasing to the listener). These texts include Samhita-pathas and Pada-pathas, and partially or fully surviving manuscripts include Paniniya Shiksha, Naradiya Shiksha, Bharadvaja Shiksha, Yajnavalkya Shiksha, Vasishthi Shiksha, Parashari Shiksha, Katyayani Shiksha and Manduki Shiksha.

== History ==
Speech and soul?

Having intellectually determined the object to be communicated to others, the soul urges the mind in order to give expression, i.e., to vocalize the thought rising within. The mind so stimulated acts upon the physical fire which in its turn brings about a movement in the region of internal air. The internal air thus moved gets upward till it reaches the vocal apparatus.

— Pāninīya-śikṣā

Shiksha, states Hartmut Scharfe, was the first branch of linguistics to develop as an independent Vedic field of study among the Vedangas. This is likely because Vedas were transmitted from one generation to the next by oral tradition, and the preservation and the techniques of preservation depended on phonetics, states Scharfe.

The earliest Brahmanas – a layer of text within the Vedas, includes some terms of art in the Vedic phonetics, such as Varna and Avasana. The Shiksha field was likely well developed by the time Aranyakas and Upanishads layer of the Vedas were being composed. The alphabet had been categorized by this time, into vowels (svara), stops (sparsha), semivowels (antastha) and spirants (ushman). The field was fundamental to the ancient study of linguistics, and it developed as an interest and inquiry into sounds rather than letters. Shiksha, as described in these ancient texts, had six chapters – varna (sound), svara (accent), matra (quantity), bala (strength, articulation), saman(recital) and samtana (connection between preceding and following sounds).

The insights from this field, states Scharfe, "without doubt was applied by Vedic scholars to the art of writing". It also impacted the development of Indic scripts and evolution of language in countries that sought Indian texts or were influenced by Indian religions. According to Scharfe, and other scholars, the insights developed in this field, over time, likely also influenced phonetic scripts in parts of East Asia, as well as Arabic grammarian Khalil in 8th-century CE.

== Discussion ==
Shiksha and the Sanskrit alphabet

A strictly symmetrical [Sanskrit] alphabet definitely has practical advantages in language teaching, but this is almost certainly not the reason for its highly complex structure. [...] A better explanation of the structural density is the striving for perfect and beautifully formed representation of the object of study. The rule of the grammarians show a similar striving for order.

— Annette Wilke and Oliver Moebus

The Shiksha field of Vedic studies arranged the Sanskrit alphabet in a rational order, state Wilke and Moebus, each mapped to the anatomical nature of human sounds, from the back to the front – throat (at the very back), palate, palatal ridge, teeth and lips. The letters of the Sanskrit alphabet were further organized by the Vedic scholars into a magic square, making symmetrical and resonant alternate readings of the letters possible, such as top to bottom in addition to left to right. Further, the Shiksha scholars added Mudra (hand signs) to go with each sound, thereby providing a visual confirmation and an alternative means to check the reading integrity by the audience, in addition to the audible means.

These Mudras continue to be part of the classical Indian dance tradition. This interplay of the gesture and sound in Sanskrit recital, state Wilke and Moebus, is similar to the gesture of a conductor and the sound produced by music players in any classical orchestra. In Sanskrit, the posture of the performer is an added dimension to those of pronunciation and gesture, together these empowered muscular memory with acoustic memory in the Hindu tradition of remembering and transmitting Sanskrit texts from one generation to the next, state Wilke and Moebus.

The methodical phonetic procedure developed by Shiksha helped preserve the Vedas without the slightest variants in the most faithful way possible. It made the Vedas and embedded Principal Upanishads the canonical scriptures of Hinduism. The rules and symmetric of Siksa helped the student to master enormous volumes of knowledge, and use the embedded codes and rules to self check his memory.

However, state Wilke and Moebus, the Shiksha methodology has been not just highly technical, it has strong aesthetic "sensuous, emotive" dimension, which foster thinking and intellectual skills in a participatory fashion. The reciter's mind and body are engaged, making language and sound as an emotional performance. The study of phonetics functioned to transform a Vedic text, which traditionally was composed as language-music, into a musical performance. Individual sounds in the Sanskrit have independent personalities, and the reciter helps develop their character and their timbre, state Wilke and Moebus. Naradiya Siksa, a phonetics treatise on the Sama Veda explains this aspects of phonology with various similes, such as,

Just as a tigress takes her cubs tightly in her teeth without hurting them, whilst fearing that she might drop them and injure them, so one should approach the individual syllables.

— Naradiya Siksa 2.8.31, translated by Annette Wilke and Oliver Moebus

=== Pratishakhyas ===
Pratisakhyas are the oldest Shiksha textbooks of each branch of the Vedas. Later Shiksha texts are more specialized and systematic, and often titled with suffix "Shiksha", such as the Naradiya-Shiksha, Vyasa-Shiksha, Pari-Shiksha and Sarvasammata-Shiksha.

The Pratishakhyas, which evolved from the more ancient Vedic texts padapathas (padapāṭha) around 800 BCE, deal with the manner in which the Vedas are to be enunciated. There are separate Pratishakhyas for each Veda. They complement the books called Shiksha written by various authorities. Several Pratishakhyas have survived into the modern era, and these texts refine the structure of sound at different levels of nuance, some adding many more letters to the basic set in the Sanskrit alphabet:

- Rigveda-Pratishakya: 47 letters
- Shukla Yajurveda-Pratishakhya: 65 letters
- Taittiriya (Krishna Yajurveda) Pratishakhya: 52 letters
- Atharvaveda-Pratishakhya (Shaunakiya shakha)
- Samaveda-Pratishakhya (Rig-tantra): 57 letters (Pushpasutra is the second Pratishakhya of Samaveda)
- Paniniya-Shiksha: 63 or 64 letters

The Shiksha texts and the Pratishakhyas led to great clarity in understanding the surface structure of language. For clarity of pronunciation, they broke up the large Vedic compounds into word stems, prefixes, and suffixes. Certain styles of recitation (pāṭha), such as the jaṭāpāṭha, involved switching syllables, repeating the last word of a line at the beginning of the next, and other permutations. In the process, a considerable amount of morphology is discussed, particularly regarding the combination of sequential sounds, which leads to the modalities of sandhi. The Samaveda Pratishakhya, one of the earliest, organizes the stop consonant sounds into a 5x5 varga or square:

The magic square within Sanskrit alphabet
Gutturals	ka	kha	ga	gha	ṅa
Palatals	ca	cha	ja	jha	ña
Retroflex	ṭa	ṭha	ḍa	ḍha	ṇa
Dentals	ta	tha	da	dha	na
Labials	pa	pha	ba	bha	ma

The alphabet is designed such that the difference between sounds is preserved whether you recite it horizontally or vertically. It was extended and completed with fricatives and sibilants, semi-vowels, and vowels, and was eventually codified into the Brahmi alphabet, which is one of the most systematic sound-to-writing mappings. Scholar Frits Staal has commented, "Like Mendelejev’s Periodic System of Elements, the varga system was the result of centuries of analysis. In the course of that development the basic concepts of phonology were discovered and defined.

The Varga system and the Pratishakshyas, contributions of the Shiksha texts, are elaborate systems which deal with the generation and classification of sound.

=== Other Shiksha texts ===
In addition, several Shiksha texts exist, most of them in metrical verse form but a few in sutra form. The following list contains some of these surviving texts: Amoghanandini Shiksha, Apisali Shiksha (in sutra form), Aranya Shiksha, Atreya Shiksha, Avasananirnyaya Shiksha, Bharadvaja Shiksha, Chandra Shiksha of Chandragomin (sutra form), Charayaniya Shiksha, Galadrka Shiksha, Kalanirnya Shiksha, Katyayani Shiksha, Kaundinya Shiksha, Keshavi Shiksha, Kramakarika Shiksha, Kramasandhaana Shiksha, Laghumoghanandini Shiksha, Lakshmikanta Shiksha, Lomashi Shiksha, Madhyandina Shiksha, Mandavya Shiksha, Mallasharmakrta Shiksha, Manasvaara Shiksha, Manduki Shiksha, Naradiya Shiksha, Paniniya Shiksha (versified), Paniniya Shiksha (in sutra form), Paniniya Shiksha (with accents), Parashari Shiksha, Padyaatmika Keshavi Shiksha, Pari Shiksha, Pratishakhyapradipa Shiksha, Sarvasammata Shiksha, Shaishiriya Shiksha, Shamaana Shiksha, Shambhu Shiksha, Shodashashloki Shiksha, Shikshasamgraha, Siddhanta Shiksha, Svaraankusha Shiksha, Svarashtaka Shiksha, Svaravyanjana Shiksha, Vasishtha Shiksha, Varnaratnapradipa Shiksha, Vyaali Shiksha, Vyasa Shiksha, Yajnavalkya Shiksha

Although many of these Shiksha texts are attached to specific Vedic schools, others are late texts.

== Sound and alphabet ==
Traditionally syllables (not letters) in Sanskrit are called Akshara, meaning "imperishable (entity)": "atoms" of speech, as it were. These aksharas are classified mainly into two types:

- Svara (pratyahara ach): Vowel
- Vyanjana (pratyahara hal): Consonant

Svara aksharas are also known as prana akshara; i.e., they are main sounds in speech, without which speech is not possible. Pāṇini referred to svara as ac pratyahara. Later they became known as ac Akshara.

Vyanjana means embellishment, i.e., consonants are used as embellishment in order to yield sonorant vowels. They are also known as Prani akshara; that is, they are like a body to which life (svara) is added. Pāṇini's name for vyanjana was Hal Pratyahara, which were later referred to as Hal akshara.

Vyanjana aksharas are divided into three types:

- Sparśa: Stop
- Antastha: Approximant
- Ūṣman: Sibilant

Sparsa aksharas include syllables from ka to ma; they are 25 in number. Antastha aksharas include syllables ya, ra, la and va. Usman aksharas include śa, ṣa, sa and ha.

=== Vowels ===
Each vowel can be classified into three types based on the duration of pronunciation (morae):

- Hrasva: Short vowel, Eka-mātra
- Dīrgha: Long vowel, Dvi-mātra
- Pluta: Prolonged vowel, Tri-mātra (pluti)

We see that each vowel can be pronounced in three ways according to the duration of articulation. The unit of time is a mātra, which is approximately 0.2 seconds. It is approximately 0.2 seconds because 1 prana (1 respiration) is 10 long syllables or approximately 4 seconds and a long syllable is counted as two morae (mātra), thus 4÷(10×2) = 0.2.

Each vowel can be further classified into two types based on the manner of pronunciation:

Mukha: Oral (open)
Nāsika: Nasal (all vowels are considered phonemically oral)

Each vowel can also be classified into three types, that is, pronounced in three ways, based on accent of articulation. This feature was lost in Classical Sanskrit, but used in reciting Vedic and Upanishadic hymns and mantras.

Udātta: high pitch
Anudātta: low pitch
Svarita: descending pitch (usually follows high pitch)

=== Articulation ===
Generally, in articulatory phonetics, the place of articulation (or point of articulation) of a consonant is the point of contact, where an obstruction occurs in the vocal tract between an active (moving) articulator (typically some part of the tongue) and a passive (stationary) articulator (typically some part of the roof of the mouth).

But according to Indian linguistic tradition, there are five passive places of articulation:

Kaṇṭhya: Velar
Tālavya: Palatal
Mūrdhanya: Retroflex
Dantya : Dental
Ōṣṭhya : Labial

Apart from that, other articulations are combinations of the above five places:

Dant'oṣṭhya: Labio-dental (E.g.: v)
Kanthatālavya: e.g.: Diphthong e
Kaṇṭhōṣṭhya: labial-velar (E.g.: Diphthong o)

There are three active places of articulation:

Jihvāmūla: tongue root, for velar
Jihvāmadhya: tongue body, for palatal
Jihvāgra: tip of tongue, for cerebral and dental
Adhōṣṭha: lower lip, for labial

Effort (or manner) of articulation (Uccāraṇa Prayatna) is of two types for consonants,

Bāhya Prayatna: External effort

Spṛṣṭa: Plosive
Īshat Spṛṣṭa: Approximant
Īshat Saṃvṛta: Fricative

Abhyantara Prayatna: Internal effort

Alpaprāṇa: Unaspirated
Mahāprāṇa: Aspirated
Śvāsa: Unvoiced
Nāda: Voiced

=== Articulation of consonants ===
Articulation of consonants will be a logical combination of components in the two prayatnas. The below table gives a view upon articulation of consonants.

Samskrita Vyanjana Ucchārana Pattika
Prayatna Niyamāvalī	Kanthya (jihvāmūla)	Tālavya (jihvāmadhya)	Mūrdhanya (jihvāgra)	Dantya (jihvāgra)	Dantoṣṭya	Oṣṭya (adhosta)
Sparśa, Śvāsa, Alpaprāṇa	ka	ca	ṭa	ta	—	pa
Sparśa, Śvāsa, Mahāprāṇa	kha	cha	ṭha	tha	—	pha
Sparśa, Nāda, Alpaprāṇa	ga	ja	ḍa	da	—	ba
Sparśa, Nāda, Mahāprāṇa	gha	jha	ḍha	dha	—	bha
Sparśa, Nāda, Alpaprāṇa, Anunāsika, Drava, Avyāhata	ṅa	ña	ṇa	na	—	ma
Antastha, Nāda, Alpaprāṇa, Drava, Avyāhata	—	ya	ra (Lunthita)	la (Pārśvika)	va	—
Ūṣman, Śvāsa, Mahāprāṇa, Avyāhata	Visarga	śa	ṣa	sa	—	—
Ūṣman, Nāda, Mahāprāṇa, Avyāhata	ha	—	—	—	—	—

== See also ==
- Shiva Sutra
- Nandinagari
- Devanagari
