= Rama Nath Sharma =

Indian scholar

Ramanath Sharma
- Born: 1 March 1939 (age 87); Chhata, Ballia, UP, India
- Died: 16 October 2026 (aged 87); Atlanta, Georgia, USA

Philosophical work
- Main interests: Pāṇini Sanskrit grammar
- Notable works: The Astadhyayi of Panini

Rama Nath Sharma (also written as Ramanath Sharma) was born in 1939 at Chhata, Ballia, India in a family of traditional Sanskrit scholars. He studied Sanskrit from his father Padmashri Paṇḍita Raghunath Sharma, the author of the famous commentary Ambākartrī on the Vākyapadīyam of Bhartṛhari. Dr. Sharma is the author of 6 volumes containing a comprehensive translation and analysis of the fundamental work on the grammar of ancient Sanskrit, the Aṣṭādhyāyī of Pāṇini.

== Education ==
He completed his early education, as well as the Undergraduate education, at Varanasi, with B.A. (1957) from Banaras Hindu University; M. A. (1959, Hindi Literature, University of Allahabad); and M.A. (1962, General Linguistics, K.M. Institute, Agra University). He received his Ph.D. (1971, General Linguistics) from the University of Rochester, Rochester, New York.

== Academic career ==
He taught Hindi Literature, and General Linguistics, at the University of Allahabad (1962–66). He joined the faculty of the University of Rochester, Rochester, New York, as an assistant professor of linguistics (1971–76). He moved on to the University of Hawaii at Mānoa (1976), Honolulu, Hawaii (U.S.A.), as assistant professor of Sanskrit.

He was also Director of South Asian Studies Program (1978–83), and Member Trustee of the American Institute of Indian Studies. He served as Professor and Chairman of the Department of Hawaiian and Indo-Pacific Languages during the years 1997–2000.

He retired as Professor of Sanskrit in 2012, is currently an Emeritus Professor of Sanskrit at the University of Hawaii. He lives in Honolulu, Hawaii, with his wife, and regularly (September–December) visits Varanasi (India) where he has a vacation home. He travelled every summer to the family farm house at Chhata to study the Vyākaraṇa-mahābhāṣya of Patañjali. He studied the Kāśikāvṛtti of Vāmana-Jayāditya from Paṇḍit Rāmaprasāda Tripāthī, at Varanasi.

Professor Sharma is internationally known for his lectures on, and studies in, the Aṣṭādhyāyī of Pāṇini, and Sanskrit Intellectual Tradition. He travelled to all major institutions of higher learning in India, including the I.I.T. Kanpur, lecturing on Pāṇini as a Fulbright scholar (2005).

He has presented papers, chaired sessions, and delivered key-note addresses, at many National-International Conferences. He presented a special Panel on Reinterpreting Pāṇini at the World Sanskrit Conference, New Delhi (2012). He made a special presentation on, "Rule-interaction, Blocking and Derivation in Pāṇini", at the International Seminar on Sanskrit Computational Linguistics, JNU (Dec, 2010 ), New Delhi. He presented a key-note address at the World Vedic Conference (2007: Vrindavan), on "Dharma, Karma and Yoga", the three Perspectives to Way of Life, and also two Guest Lectures at the Seminar on Indian Intellectual Tradition, at the Sāhitya Academy, New Delhi (2013).
