= Shiva Sutras =

14 verses organizing the phonemes of Sanskrit

The Śiva·sūtras, technically akṣara·samāmnāya, variously called माहेश्वरसूत्राणि (IAST: māheśvarāṇi sūtrāṇi), प्रत्याहारसूत्राणि (IAST: pratyāhāra·sūtrāṇi), वर्णसमाम्नाय (IAST: varṇa·samāmnāya), etc., refer to a set of fourteen aphorisms devised as an arrangement of the sounds of Sanskrit for the purposes of grammatical exposition as carried out by the grammarian Pāṇini in the Aṣṭādhyāyī.

== Text and notation ==
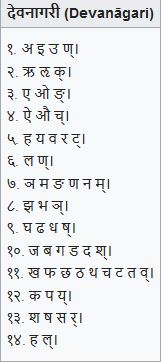
Mahesvara sutrani

1. a i u Ṇ
2. ṛ ḷ K
3. e o Ṅ
4. ai au C
5. ha ya va ra Ṭ
6. la Ṇ
7. ña ma ṅa ṇa na M
8. jha bha Ñ
9. gha ḍha dha Ṣ
10. ja ba ga ḍa da Ś
11. kha pha cha ṭha tha ca ṭa ta V
12. ka pa Y
13. śa ṣa sa R
14. ha L

Each verse consists of a group of basic Sanskrit phonemes (i.e. open syllables consisting either of initial vowels or consonants followed by the basic vowel "a") followed by a single 'dummy letter', or anubandha, conventionally rendered in upper case and named 'IT' by Pāṇini.

== Shiva Sutras ==
The following table shows the Shiva Sutras in Devanāgarī Script and their transliteration into the well-used transliteration scheme of Indic characters by Latin scripts viz. ISO 15919, ITRANS, and IPA.

ISO 15919 (Indic)	Roman (ITRANS)	IPA	Devanagari
1. a i u ṇ, 2. r̥ l̥ k, 3. ē ō ṅ, 4. ai au c, 5. ha ya va ra ṭ, 6. la ṇ, 7. ña ma ṅa ṇa na m, 8. jha bha ñ; 9. gha ḍha dha ṣ; 10. ja ba ga ḍa da ś; 11. kha pha cha ṭha tha ca ṭa ta v; 12. ka pa y; 13. śa ṣa sa r; 14. ha l	1. a i u N, 2. R^i L^i k, 3. e o ~N, 4. ai au ch, 5. ha ya va ra T, 6. la N, 7. ~na ma ~Na Na na m, 8. jha bha ~n; 9. gha Dha dha Sh; 10. ja ba ga Da da sh; 11. kha pha Cha Tha tha cha Ta ta v; 12. ka pa y; 13. sha Sha sa r; 14. ha l	1. ə ɪ u ɳ, 2. ɾɨ lɨ k, 3. eː oː ŋ, 4. əɪ əu t͡ʃ, 5. ɦə jə ʋə ɾə ʈ, 6. lə ɳ, 7. ɲə mə ŋə ɳə n̪ə m, 8. d͡ʒʰə bʰə ɲ; 9. gʰə ɖʰə d̪ʰə ʂ; 10. d͡ʒə bə gə ɖə d̪ə ʃ; 11. kʰə pʰə t͡ʃʰə ʈʰə t̪ʰə t͡ʃə ʈə t̪ə ʋ; 12. kə pə j; 13. ʃə ʂə s̪ə ɾ; 14. ɦə l	१. अ इ उ ण्, २. ऋ ऌ क्, ३. ए ओ ङ्, ४. ऐ औ च्, ५. ह य व र ट्, ६. ल ण्, ७. ञ म ङ ण न म्, ८. झ भ ञ्; ९. घ ढ ध ष्; १०. ज ब ग ड द श्; ११. ख फ छ ठ थ च ट त व्; १२. क प य्; १३. श ष स र्; १४. ह ल्

== Scheme ==
This allows Pāṇini to refer to groups of phonemes with pratyāhāras, which consist of a phoneme-letter and an anubandha (and often the vowel a to aid pronunciation) and signify all of the intervening phonemes. Pratyāhāras are thus single syllables, but they can be declined (see Aṣṭādhyāyī 6.1.77 below). Hence the pratyāhāra aL refers to all phonemes (because it consists of the first phoneme of the first verse (a) and the last anubandha of the last verse (L)); aC refers to vowels (i.e., all of the phonemes before the anubandha C: i.e. a i u ṛ ḷ e o ai au); haL to consonants, and so on.

=== Issues ===
Note that some pratyāhāras are ambiguous. The anubandha Ṇ occurs twice in the list, which means that you can assign two different meanings to pratyāhāra aṆ (including or excluding ṛ, etc.); in fact, both of these meanings are used in the Aṣṭādhyāyī. On the other hand, the pratyāhāra haL is always used in the meaning "all consonants"—Pāṇini never uses pratyāhāras to refer to sets consisting of a single phoneme.

=== Combinations ===
From these 14 verses, a total of 280 pratyāhāras can be formed: 14*3 + 13*2 + 12*2 + 11*2 + 10*4 + 9*1 + 8*5 + 7*2 + 6*3 + 5*5 + 4*8 + 3*2 + 2*3 +1*1, minus 14 (as Pāṇini does not use single element pratyāhāras) minus 11 (as there are 11 duplicate sets due to h appearing twice); the second multiplier in each term represents the number of phonemes in each. But Pāṇini uses only 41 (with a 42nd introduced by later grammarians, raṆ=r l) pratyāhāras in the Aṣṭādhyāyī.

=== Arrangement ===
The Akṣarasamāmnāya puts phonemes with a similar manner of articulation together (so sibilants in 13 śa ṣa sa R, nasals in 7 ñ m ṅ ṇ n M). Economy (Note: lāghava) is a major principle of their organization, and it is debated whether Pāṇini deliberately encoded phonological patterns in them (as they were treated in traditional phonetic texts called Prātiśakyas) or simply grouped together phonemes which he needed to refer to in the Aṣṭādhyāyī and which only secondarily reflect phonological patterns. (Note: as argued by Paul Kiparsky and Wiebke Petersen, for example) Pāṇini does not use the Akṣarasamāmnāya to refer to homorganic stops, (Note: stop consonants produced at the same place of articulation) but rather the anubandha U: to refer to the palatals c ch j jh he uses cU.

== Example ==
As an example, consider Aṣṭādhyāyī 6.1.77: iKaḥ yaṆ aCi:

- iK means i u ṛ ḷ,
- iKaḥ is iK in the genitive case, so it means ' in place of i u ṛ ḷ;
- yaṆ means the semivowels y v r l and is in the nominative, so iKaḥ yaṆ means: y v r l replace i u ṛ ḷ.
- aC means all vowels, as noted above
- aCi is in the locative case, so it means before any vowel.

Hence this rule replaces a vowel with its corresponding semivowel when followed by any vowel, and that is why dadhi together with atra makes dadhyatra. To apply this rule correctly we must be aware of some of the other rules of the grammar, such as:

- 1.1.49 ṣaṣṭhī sthāneyogā which says that the genitive case in a sutra signifies "in the place of"
- 1.1.50 sthāne 'ntaratamaḥ which says that in a substitution, the element in the substitute series that most closely resembles the letter to be substituted should be used (e.g. y for i, r for ṛ etc.)
- 1.1.71 ādir antyena sahetā which says that a sequence with an element at the beginning (e.g. i) and an IT letter (e.g. K) at the end stands for the intervening letters (i.e. i u ṛ ḷ, because the Akṣarasamāmnāya sutras read i u ṛ ḷ K).

Also, rules can be debarred by other rules:

- 6.1.101 aKaḥ savarṇe dīrghaḥ teaches that vowels (from the aK pratyāhāra) of the same quality come together to make a long vowel, so for instance dadhi and indraḥ make dadhīndraḥ, not *dadhyindraḥ. This aKaḥ savarṇe dīrghaḥ rule takes precedence over the general iKaḥ yaṆ aCi rule mentioned above, because this rule is more specific.

== Pratyāhāras ==
Despite the possible combinations seen above, here are the 41 pratyāhāras in actual use by Pāṇini:

Pratyāhāra	Phoneme class	Pāṇini's term	Phonemes included
aL	all sounds	varṇa	
Syllabic nuclei (vowels & syllabic liquids)
aC	all syllabics	svara	a i u ṛ ḷ e o ai au
aK	simple syllabics	samānākṣara	a i u r̥ l̥
aṆ	monophthongs		a i u
iC	non-open syllabics (Note: These phonemes induce retroflexion, vide RUKI sound law.)	nāmin	i u r̥ l̥ e o ai au
iK	close syllabics		i u r̥ l̥
uK	non-palatal close syllabics		u r̥ l̥
eC	diphthongs (Note: These phonemes are classified as diphthongs (sandhyakṣara) because they are phonologically complex. While e and o are phonetically monophthongs in Classical Sanskrit, e ai o au behave as diphthongs in Sandhi (reverting to their historical components, e.g., e → ay) and were historically realized as ai āi au āu. See Whitney, Sanskrit Grammar §27.)	sandhyakṣara	e o ai au
eṆ	short diphthongs		e o
aiC	long diphthongs		ai au
Consonants
haL	all consonants	vyañjana	
haŚ	voiced consonants	ghoṣavats	
yaR	non-glottal consonants		
yaY	stops & approximants	sparśāntaḥstha	
yaÑ	resonants, jh, bh		
yaM	resonants		y v r l ñ m ṅ ṇ n
yaṆ	approximants	antaḥsthas	y v r l
vaL	consonants except y		
vaŚ	voiced consonants except y		
raL	consonants except y v		
ñaM	nasal stops		ñ m ṅ ṇ n
maY	stops except ñ		
ṅaM	nasals except ñ m		ṅ ṇ n
jhaL	obstruents		
jhaR	obstruents except h		
jhaY	oral stops		
jhaŚ	voiced oral stops		jh bh gh ḍh dh j b g ḍ d
jhaṢ	breathy voiced stops		jh bh gh ḍh dh
bhaṢ	breathy voiced plosives		bh gh ḍh dh
jaŚ	modal voiced oral stops		j b g ḍ d
baŚ	modal voiced plosives		b g ḍ d
khaR	voiceless obstruents		
khaY	voiceless stops		kh ph ch ṭh th k p c ṭ t
chaV	coronal voiceless stops		ch ṭh th c ṭ t
caY	voiceless unaspirated stops		k p c ṭ t
caR	voiceless unaspirated obstruents		
śaL	fricatives	ūṣman	ś ṣ s h
śaR	voiceless fricatives		ś ṣ s
Other classes
aŚ	voiced sounds		
aM	voiced sonorants		
aṆ	voiced continuants		
aṬ	voiced median continuants		
iṆ	non-open continuants		i u ṛ ḷ e o ai au h y v r l

== See also ==
- Generative grammar
- Aṣṭādhyāyī
- Pāṇini
- Sanskrit grammar

Organization of sounds in other languages

- Alphabet song
- Iroha, a Japanese pangram
- Thousand Character Classic, a Chinese mnemonic traditionally popular in Korea

== Bibliography ==
- Böhtlingk, Otto (1887). Pâṇini's Grammatik. Motilal Banarsidass.
- Vasu, Chandra (1891). The Aṣṭādhyāyī of Pāṇini. Motilal Banarsidass. (Books I to VIII reflecting the original)
- Cardona, George (1997). Pāṇini - His work and its traditions. Motilal Banarsidass. ISBN 81-208-0419-8.
