= Kapil Muni Tiwary =

Indian linguist (1932–2021)

- Born: 1932; Nainijor-Bishupur village, Bhojpur District, Bihar
- Died: 26 April 2021 (aged 88–89)
- Education: University of Pennsylvania
- Occupation: Linguist

Kapil Muni Tiwary (1932 – 26 April 2021) was an Indian professor and head of the department of Linguistics and Literature at Patna University and a professor of English in Yemen.

Tiwary published many articles in Yemen Times Newspaper during the period 2000/2004. His articles were about Indian loan words into Arabic and vice versa.

== Biography ==
Kapil Muni Tiwary was born in Nainijor village in a Bhumihar family of 'Nainijora Tiwary' clan in Bhojpur District of Bihar, India. He graduated from the University of Pennsylvania in 1966 with a dissertation on grammar and phonology, Comparative reconstruction of Indo-Iranian sounds: On the basis of 'An Avesta grammar in comparison with Sanskrit, part 1' by A. V. Williams Jackson.

Tiwary was a scholar of South Asian languages. He has published on such topics as echo words in Bhojpuri and has argued that echo-word constructions (in which "a word is repeated without its initial consonant, sometimes with a vowel change") can function as a kind of secret language. He coined the term "institutionalized weeping" in a study of weeping among Tamil women.

Tiwary died on 26 April 2021.

== Books ==
Tiwary's first book, Panini's description of Sanskrit nominal compounds, was published by Janaki Prakashan, Patna in 1984. Another book, Language Deprivation and the socially disadvantaged: with special reference to Bihar, was published by Janaki Prakashan in 1994. This book was an outcome of a project of Indian Council of Social Science Research on which he was working in the eighties.

== Editor ==
Tiwary was one of the editors of a bi-annual journal of social sciences and humanities, Explorations in 1987–88. His article, Caste-Conflict: A View from Bhojpur, was published in Volume I, No. I of Exploration in 1987.

Tiwary also edited an anthology of English prose, Aspects of English prose: an anthology, with R.C. Prasad in 1986.

== Linguist ==
His articles and books on various branches of linguists have been of special interest for the scholars in India and abroad.
