= Dilip Kumar Chakrabarti =

Indian archaeologist

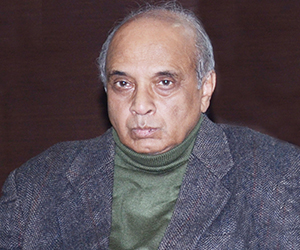
- Born: 27 April 1941 (age 85); Calcutta, British India
- Education: Calcutta University
- Occupations: Historian, Archaeologist
- Known for: Studies on the early use of iron in India and the archaeology of Eastern India
- Awards: Padma Shri (2019); Gurudeva Ranade Award from Indian Archaeological Society, Delhi, honorary D.Litt. from M. J. P. Rohilkhand University
- Website: cambridge.academia.edu/DilipKChakrabarti

Dilip Kumar Chakrabarti (born 27 April 1941) is an Indian archaeologist, Professor Emeritus of South Asian Archaeology at Cambridge University, and a Senior Fellow at the McDonald Institute for Archaeological Research, Cambridge University. He is known for his studies on the early use of iron in India and the archaeology of Eastern India.

== Career ==
Dilip K Chakrabarti is the first person to hold professorship in the field of ancient Indian history at Cambridge University. He started his career as a lecturer of Archaeology at Calcutta University from 1965 to 1977. He was a reader of Archaeology at Delhi University from 1977 to 1990 and also held a tenured appointment at Visva Bharati University from 1980 to 1981. He moved to a teaching post in South Asian archaeology at Cambridge University in 1990 and was promoted to professor prior to his retirement in 2008. He has also held visiting fellowships, scholarships, teaching appointments and received grants in Cambridge, Edinburgh, Tehran, New York, Paris, Jahangir Nagar (Bangladesh) and Armidale (Australia).

He has archaeologically surveyed the Kangra valley, the whole of the Chhotanagpur plateau, the whole of the Ganga-Yamuna plain and Haryana-Panjab between 1980 and 2008. During this period he also worked out in the field the archaeology of the routes which linked the Ganga plain with the Deccan and the ancient routes of the Deccan and the southern Peninsula. After his retirement in 2008 he completed a spell of field-studies in Rajasthan. In 1963-79 he participated in archaeological field-projects in India and Iran. On these field-topics and other problems of Indian archaeology, he has authored (co-authored in two cases) 29 books (one in press) and edited/co-edited about a dozen more. He is presently Distinguished Fellow at the Delhi-based think tank, Vivekananda International Foundation, where he is also the Editor of the eleven-volume VIF series History of Ancient India.

Dr. Dilip Chakrabarti has strived to bring academic rigor into the Indian history research.

Chakrabarti argues 'that South Asian archaeology need not mimic the developments in the Euro-American World, but rather it should be attentive to its own needs'.

Dr. Dilip Chakrabarti also served on the Humanities jury for the Infosys Prize in 2013.

== Publications ==
- (co-authored with S J Hasan) The Antiquities of Kangra (1984) Delhi: Munshiram Manoharlal Publishers Private Limited
- Ancient Bangladesh: A Study of the Archaeological Sources (1992) Delhi: Oxford University Press
- The Early Use of Iron in India (1992) Delhi: Oxford University Press
- Archaeology of Eastern India: Chhotanagpur Plateau and West Bengal (1993) Delhi: Munshiram Manoharlal Publishers Private Limited.
- Archaeology of coastal West Bengal: Twenty-four Parganas and Midnapur districts (1994) South Asian Studies,10:pp. 135–160
- A note on the use of metals in ancient Bengal, Pratnasamiksha (1994) Bulletin of the Directorate of Archaeology and Museums, Government of West Bengal, 2 & 3:pp. 155–158
- The Archaeology of Ancient Indian Cities (1995) Delhi: Oxford University Press.
- Post-Mauryan states of mainland south Asia (1995) In: F. Raymond Allchin (ed.), The Archaeology of Early Historic South Asia, pp. 274–326. Cambridge: Cambridge University Press
- Preliminary observations on the distribution of sites in the south Bihar plain (1995) South Asian Studies, 11:pp. 129–147
- Buddhist sites across south Asia as influenced by political and economic forces (1995) World Archaeology,27(2):pp. 185–202. JSTOR 125081
- (co-authored with Nayanjot Lahiri) Copper and its Alloys in Ancient India (1996) Delhi: Munshiram Manoharlal Publishers Private Limited
- From Purnea to Champaran: The distribution of sites in the north Bihar plains (1996) South Asian Studies, 12:pp. 147–158
- Colonial Indology: Sociopolitics of the Ancient Indian Past (1997) Delhi: Munshiram Manoharlal Publishers Private Limited
- The Issues in East Indian Archaeology (1998) Delhi: Munshiram Manoharlal Publishers Private Limited
- India: An Archaeological History. Palaeolithic Beginnings to Early Historic Foundations (1999) Delhi: Oxford University Press
- Archaeological Geography of the Ganga Plain. The Lower and the Middle Ganga (2001) Delhi: Permanent Black
- The archaeology of Hinduism, in Timothy Insoll (ed.) Archaeology and World Religion (2001) London & NY: Routledge
- A History of Indian Archaeology: From the Beginning to 1947 (1988, 2001) Delhi: Munshiram Manoharlal Publishers Private Ltd.
- The Archaeology of European Expansion in India, Gujarat, c. 16th–18th Centuries (2003) Delhi: Aryan Books International
- Archaeology in the Third World: A History of Indian Archaeology since 1947 (2003) Delhi: D. K. Printworld Private Limited
- A Sourcebook of Indian Archaeology. Volume 3. Prehistoric Roots of Religious Beliefs, Human Remains, The First Steps in Historical Archaeology: Sculpture, Architecture, Coins and Inscriptions (ed. with F. Raymond Allchin) (2003) Delhi: Munshiram Manoharlal Publishers Private Ltd.
- Indus Civilization Sites in India: New Discoveries (ed.) (2004) Mumbai: Marg Publications
- The Archaeology of the Deccan Routes: The Ancient Routes from the Ganga Plain to the Deccan (2005) New Delhi: Munshiram Manoharlal Publishers Private Limited
- The Oxford Companion to Indian Archaeology: The Archaeological Foundations of Ancient India, Stone Age to AD 13th Century (2006) Delhi: Oxford University Press
- Archaeological Geography of the Ganga Plain: The Upper Ganga (Oudh, Rohilkhand, and the Doab) (2008) New Delhi: Munshiram Manoharlal Publishers Private Limited
- The Battle for Ancient India: An Essay in the Sociopolitics of Indian Archaeology (2008) Delhi: Aryan Books International
- The Geopolitical Orbits of Ancient India (2010) Delhi: Oxford University Press
- The Ancient Routes of the Deccan and the Southern Peninsula (2010) Delhi: Aryan Books International
- Royal Messages by the Wayside: Historical Geography of the Asokan Edicts (2011) Delhi: Aryan Books International
- Fifty Years of Indian Archaeology (1960-2010): Journey of a Foot Soldier (2012) Delhi: Aryan Books International
- (co-edited with Makkhan Lal) History of Ancient India I: Prehistoric Roots (2013) Delhi: Vivekananda International Foundation & Aryan Books International
- (co-edited with Makkhan Lal) History of Ancient India II: Protohistoric Foundations (2013) Delhi: Vivekananda International Foundation & Aryan Books International
- (co-edited with Makkhan Lal) History of Ancient India III: The Texts, Political History and Administration, till c. 200 BC (2013) Delhi: Vivekananda International Foundation & Aryan Books International
- (co-edited with Makkhan Lal) History of Ancient India IV: Political History and Administration (c. 200 BC-AD 750) (2013) Delhi: Vivekananda International Foundation & Aryan Books International
- (co-edited with Makkhan Lal) History of Ancient India V: Political History and Administration (c. AD 750-1300) (2013) Delhi: Vivekananda International Foundation & Aryan Books International
- Nation First: Essays in the Politics of Ancient Indian Studies (Including an Analysis of the CAG Report on the Archaeological Survey of India) (2014) Delhi: Aryan Books International
- History of Ancient India VI: Social, Political and Judicial Ideas, Institutions and Practices (2018) Delhi: Vivekananda International Foundation & Aryan Books International
- History of Ancient India VII: Economy: Agriculture, Crafts and Trade (2018) Delhi: Vivekananda International Foundation & Aryan Books International
- The Borderlands and Boundaries of the Indian Subcontinent: Baluchistan to the Patkai Range and Arakan Yoma (2018) Delhi: Aryan Books International
