= Aṣṭādhyāyī =

Early Sanskrit grammar text

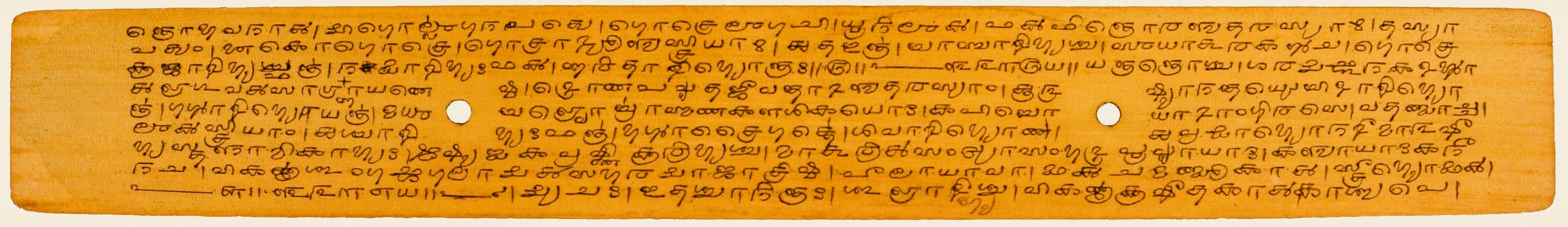
- Palm-leaf page from a version of Aṣṭādhyāyī in Grantha script.
- Author: Pāṇini
- Language: Sanskrit
- Subject: Grammar, Linguistics
- Publication date: c. 600–400 BCE
- Original text: Aṣṭādhyāyī at Sanskrit Wikisource

The Aṣṭādhyāyī (/ˌæstədˈjɑː(j)i/; Sanskrit: अष्टाध्यायी [ɐʂʈaːdʱjáːjiː]) is a grammar text that describes a form of the Sanskrit language.

Attributed to Pāṇini, the composition of the work is dated to somewhere between the 6th and 4th c. BCE. It describes the language as current in his time, specifically the dialect and register of an elite of model speakers, referred to by Pāṇini himself as śiṣṭa. The work also accounts both for some features specific to the older Vedic form of the language, as well as certain dialectal features current in the author's time.

The Aṣṭādhyāyī employs a derivational system to describe the language.

The Aṣṭādhyāyī is supplemented by three ancillary texts: Akṣarasamāmnāya, Dhātupāṭha (Note: dhātu: root, pāṭha: reading, lesson) and Gaṇapāṭha. (Note: gaṇa: class)

== Etymology ==
Aṣṭādhyāyī is made of two words aṣṭa-, 'eight' and adhyāya-, 'chapter', thus meaning eight-chaptered, or 'the book of eight chapters'.

== Background ==
=== Grammatical tradition ===
By 1000 BCE, a large body of hymns composed in the oldest attested form of the Vedic Sanskrit had been consolidated into the Rigveda, which formed the canonical basis of the Vedic religion, being transmitted from generation to generation entirely orally.

In the course of the following centuries, as the popular speech evolved, growing concern among the guardians of the Vedic religion that the hymns be passed on without 'corruption' led to the rise of a vigorous, sophisticated grammatical tradition involving the study of linguistic analysis, in particular phonetics alongside grammar. The high point of this centuries-long endeavour was Pāṇini's Aṣṭādhyāyī, which eclipsed all others before him.

While not the first, the Aṣṭādhyāyī is the oldest linguistic and grammar text, and one of the oldest Sanskrit texts, surviving in its entirety. Pāṇini refers to older texts such as the Unādisūtra, Dhātupāṭha, and Gaṇapātha but some of these have only survived in part.

=== Arrangement ===
The Aṣṭādhyāyī consists of 3,983 sūtras (Note: aphoristic threads) in eight chapters, which are each subdivided into four sections or pādas. There are different types of sūtras, with the vidhisūtra – operational rules, being the main one. The other, ancillary sūtras, are:

- paribhāṣā – metarules
- adhikāra – headings
- atideśa-sūtra – extension rules
- niyama-sūtra – restrictive rules
- pratiṣedha- and niṣedha-sūtra – negation rules

=== Related fields ===
The Aṣṭādhyāyī is the foundation of Vyākaraṇa, one of the Vedic ancillary fields (Vedāṅgas), and complements others such as the Niruktas, Nighaṇṭus, and Śikṣā. Regarded as extremely compact without sacrificing completeness, it would become the model for later specialist technical texts or sūtras.

=== Method ===
The text takes material from lexical lists (Dhātupāṭha, Gaṇapāṭha) as input and describes algorithms to be applied to them for the generation of well-formed words. It is highly systematised and technical. Inherent in its approach are the concepts of the phoneme, the morpheme and the root. (Note: His rules have a reputation for perfection – that is, they tersely describe Sanskrit morphology unambiguously and completely.) A consequence of his grammar's focus on brevity is its highly unintuitive structure, reminiscent of modern notations such as the "Backus–Naur form" . (Note: Panini-Backus form) His sophisticated logical rules and technique have been claimed to be widely influential in ancient and modern linguistics. (Note: Is-Panini-in-CFL) The text applies the minimum description length principle, maximizing both concision and completeness.

Pāṇini makes use of a technical metalanguage consisting of a syntax, morphology, and lexicon. This metalanguage is organised according to a series of meta-rules, some of which are explicitly stated while others can be deduced. (Note: "Udayana states that a technical treatise or śāstra, in any discipline, should aspire to clarity (vaiśadya), compactness (laghutā), and completeness (kṛtsnatā). A compilation of sūtras maximises compactness and completeness, at the expense of clarity. A bhāṣya is complete and clear, but not compact. A group of sūtras, a 'section' or prakaraṇa of the whole compilation, is clear and compact, but not complete. The sūtras achieve compactness i) by making sequence significant, ii) letting one item stand for or range over many, and iii) using grammar and lexicon artificially. The background model is always Pāṇini's grammar for the Sanskrit language, the Aṣṭādhyāyī, which exploits a range of brevity-enabling devices to compose what has often been described as the tersest and yet most complete grammar of any language." The monumental multi-volume grammars published in the 20th century (for Sanskrit, the Altindische Grammatik 1896–1957) of course set new standards in completeness, but the Aṣṭādhyāyī remains unrivalled in terms of terseness.)

=== Commentarial tradition ===
The Aṣṭādhyāyī, composed in an era when oral composition and transmission was the norm, is staunchly embedded in that oral tradition. In order to ensure wide dissemination, Pāṇini is said to have preferred brevity over clarity – it can be recited end-to-end in two hours. This has led to the emergence of a great number of commentaries (Note: bhāṣyas) of his work over the centuries, which for the most part adhere to the foundations laid by Pāṇini's work.

The most famous and among the most ancient of these Bhāṣyas is the Mahābhāṣya (Note: great commentary) of Patañjali. (Note: Patañjali may or may not be the same person as the one who authored Yogasūtras) (Note: The Mahābhāṣya is more than a commentary on Aṣṭādhyāyī. It is the earliest known philosophical text of the Hindu Grammarians.) (Note: The earliest secondary literature on the primary text of Pāṇini are by Kātyāyana (~3rd century BCE) and Patanjali (~2nd century BCE).) Non-Hindu texts and traditions on grammar emerged after Patañjali, some of which include the Sanskrit grammar text of Jainendra of Jainism and the Chandra school of Buddhism.

=== Critical responses ===
In the Aṣṭādhyāyī, language is observed in a manner that has no parallel among Greek or Latin grammarians. Pāṇini's grammar, according to Renou and Filliozat, defines the linguistic expression and a classic that set the standard for Sanskrit language.

== Rules ==
The first two sutras are as follows:

1.1.1 vṛddhir ādaiC
1.1.2 adeṄ guṇaḥ

In these sutras, the letters which here are put into the upper case actually are special meta-linguistic symbols; they are called IT markers or, by later writers such as Katyayana and Patanjali, anubandhas (see below). The C and Ṅ refer to Shiva Sutras 4 ("ai, au, C") and 3 ("e, o, Ṅ"), respectively, forming what are known as the pratyāhāras "comprehensive designations" aiC, eṄ. They denote the list of phonemes {ai, au} and {e, o} respectively. The T appearing (in its variant form /d/) in both sutras is also an IT marker: Sutra 1.1.70 defines it as indicating that the preceding phoneme does not represent a list, but a single phoneme, encompassing all supra-segmental features such as accent and nasality. For further example, āT and aT represent ā and a respectively.

When a sutra defines the technical term, the term defined comes at the end, so the first sutra should have properly been ādaiJ vṛddhir instead of vṛddhir ādaiC. However the orders are reversed to have a good-luck word at the very beginning of the work; vṛddhir happens to mean 'prosperity' in its non-technical use.

Thus the two sutras consist of a list of phonemes, followed by a technical term; the final interpretation of the two sutras above is thus:

1.1.1: {ā, ai, au} are called vṛ́ddhi.
1.1.2: {a, e, o} are called guṇa.

At this point, one can see they are definitions of terminology: guṇa and vṛ́ddhi are the terms for the full and the lengthened Indo-European ablaut grades, respectively.

=== List of IT markers ===
Markers called it or anubandha are defined in P. 1.3.2 through P. 1.3.8. These definitions refer only to items taught in the grammar or its ancillary texts such at the Dhātupāṭha; this fact is made clear in P. 1.3.2 by the word upadeśe, which is then continued in the following six rules by anuvṛtti, ellipsis. As these anubandhas are metalinguistic markers and not pronounced in the final derived form, pada (word), they are elided by P. 1.3.9 tasya lopaḥ – 'There is elision of that (i.e. any of the preceding items which have been defined as an it).' Accordingly, Pāṇini defines the anubandhas as follows:

1. Nasalized vowels, e.g. bhañjO. Cf. P. 1.3.2.
2. A final consonant (haL). Cf. P. 1.3.3.
  2. (a) except a dental, m and s in verbal or nominal endings. Cf. P. 1.3.4.
3. Initial ñi ṭu ḍu. Cf. P 1.3.5
4. Initial ṣ of a suffix (pratyaya). Cf. P. 1.3.6.
5. Initial palatals and cerebrals of a suffix. Cf. P. 1.3.7
6. Initial l, ś, and velars but not in a taddhita 'secondary' suffix. Cf. P. 1.3.8.

A few examples of elements that contain its are as follows:

- suP nominal suffix
- Ś-IT
  - Śi strong case endings
  - Ślu elision
  - ŚaP active marker
- P-IT
  - luP elision
  - āP ā-stems
    - CāP
    - ṬāP
    - ḌāP
  - LyaP (7.1.37)
- L-IT
- K-IT
  - Ktvā
  - luK elision
- saN Desiderative
- C-IT
- M-IT
- Ṅ-IT
  - Ṅí Causative
  - Ṅii ī-stems
    - ṄīP
    - ṄīN
    - Ṅī’Ṣ
  - tiṄ verbal suffix
  - lUṄ Aorist
  - lIṄ Precative
- S-IT
- GHU class of verbal stems (1.1.20)
- GHI (1.4.7)

== Auxiliary texts ==
Pāṇini's Aṣṭādhyāyī has three associated texts.

- The Śiva Sūtras are a brief but highly organised list of phonemes.
- The Dhātupāṭha is a lexical list of verbal roots (dhātu) sorted by present class.
- The Gaṇapāṭha is a lexical list of nominal stems grouped (gaṇa, "group") by common properties.

=== Śiva Sūtras ===
The Śiva Sūtras describe a phonemic notational system in the fourteen initial lines preceding the Aṣṭādhyāyī. The notational system introduces different clusters of phonemes that serve special roles in the morphology of Sanskrit, and are referred to throughout the text. Each cluster, called a pratyāhāra, ends with a dummy sound called an anubandha (the so-called IT index), which acts as a symbolic referent for the list. Within the main text, these clusters, referred through the anubandhas, are related to various grammatical functions.

=== Dhātupāṭha ===
The Dhātupāṭha is a lexicon of Sanskrit verbal roots (dhātu) of classical Sanskrit, indicating their properties and meanings. There are approximately 2300 roots in Dhātupāṭha. Of these, 522 roots are often used in classical Sanskrit.

Dhātupāṭha is organised by the ten present classes of Sanskrit, i.e. the roots are grouped by the form of their stem in the present tense.

The ten present classes of Sanskrit are:

1. bhv-ādayaḥ (i.e., bhū-ādayaḥ) – root-full grade + a thematic presents
2. ad-ādayaḥ – root presents
3. juhoty-ādayaḥ (i.e., juhoti-ādayaḥ) – reduplicated presents
4. div-ādayaḥ – ya thematic presents
5. sv-ādayaḥ (i.e., su-ādayaḥ) – nu presents
6. tud-ādayaḥ – root-zero grade + a thematic presents
7. rudh-ādayaḥ – n-infix presents
8. tan-ādayaḥ – u presents
9. kry-ādayaḥ (i.e., krī-ādayaḥ) – ni presents
10. cur-ādayaḥ – aya presents (causatives, denominatives etc.)

The above names are composed of the first verbal root in each class followed by ādayaḥ "etc.; and next" – bhv-ādayaḥ thus means "the class starting with bhū".

The small number of class 8 verbs are a secondary group derived from class 5 roots (e.g. kṛṇoti or karoti for root kṛ), and class 10 is a special case, in that any verb can form class 10 presents, then assuming causative meaning. The roots specifically listed as belonging to class 10 are those for which any other form has fallen out of use (causative deponents, so to speak, and denominatives).

=== Gaṇapāṭha ===
The Gaṇapāṭha is a list of groups of primitive nominal stems (roots) used by the Aṣṭādhyāyī.

Examples of groups include:

1. Listing of verbal prefixes (upasarga).
2. Listing of pronouns ("pronoun" is not an accurate translation but is commonly used as the list includes 'he', 'she', 'it', but also 'all' (from which the group gets its name), 'that').

== Structure and function ==
The Gaṇapāṭha is one of the ancillary texts associated with Pāṇini's Aṣṭādhyāyī. It consists of lexical groups (gaṇas) of nominal stems that are referred to throughout the grammatical rules. By citing a gaṇa, Pāṇini is able to apply a grammatical rule to an entire class of words without enumerating every member individually. The Gaṇapāṭha thus complements the Aṣṭādhyāyī by providing the lexical groupings required for the interpretation and application of numerous sūtras.

== Commentary ==
After Pāṇini, the Mahābhāṣya of Patañjali on the Aṣṭādhyāyī is one of the three most famous works in Sanskrit grammar. It was with Patañjali that Indian linguistic science reached its definite form. The system thus established is extremely detailed as to śikṣā (phonology, including accent) and vyākaraṇa (morphology). Syntax is scarcely touched, but nirukta (etymology) is discussed, and these etymologies naturally lead to semantic explanations. People interpret his work to be a defence of Pāṇini, whose sūtras are elaborated meaningfully. He also attacks Kātyāyana rather severely. But the main contributions of Patañjali lies in the treatment of the principles of grammar enunciated by him.

== Other information ==
Pāṇini's work has been one of the important sources of cultural, religious, and geographical information about ancient India, with he himself being referred to as a Hindu scholar of grammar and linguistics. His work, for example, illustrates the word Vasudeva (4.3.98) as a proper noun in an honorific sense, that can equally mean a divine or an ordinary person. This has been interpreted by scholars as attesting the significance of god Vasudeva (Krishna) or the opposite. The concept of dharma is attested in his sutra 4.4.41 as, dharmam carati or "he observes dharma (duty, righteousness)" (cf. Taittiriya Upanishad 1.11). Much social, geographical and historical information has been thus inferred from a close reading of Pāṇini's grammar.

=== Editions ===
- Rama Nath Sharma, The Aṣṭādhyāyī of Pāṇini (6 Vols.), 2001, ISBN 8121500516
- Otto Böhtlingk, Panini's Grammatik 1887, reprint 1998 ISBN 3-87548-198-4
- Katre, Sumitra M., Astadhyayi of Panini, Austin: University of Texas Press, 1987. Reprint Delhi: Motilal Banarsidass, 1989. ISBN 0-292-70394-5
- Misra, Vidya Niwas, The Descriptive Technique of Panini, Mouton and Co., 1966.
- Vasu, Srisa Chandra, The Ashṭádhyáyí of Páṇini. Translated into English, Indian Press, Allahabad, 1898.

== Brahmic notes ==
Brahmic transliteration

== Bibliography ==
- Burrow, T. The Sanskrit Language (2001 ed.). Motilal Banarsidass. ISBN 81-208-1767-2.
- Cardona, George (1997). Pāṇini – His Work and its Traditions – Vol 1 (2nd ed.). Motilal Banarsidass. ISBN 81-208-0419-8.
- Fortson, Benjamin W. Indo-European Language and Culture (2010 ed.). Wiley-Blackwell. ISBN 978-1-4051-8895-1.
- Harold G. Coward (1990). Karl Potter (ed.). The Philosophy of the Grammarians, in Encyclopedia of Indian Philosophies. Vol. 5. Princeton University Press. ISBN 978-81-208-0426-5.
- Kale, M R (1969). A Higher Sanskrit Grammar (2002 ed.). Motilal Banarsidass. ISBN 81-208-0177-6.
- Lubin, Timothy (2024). "Sources of Authority: Authors, Texts, and Institutions in the Formation of Classical Hinduism". A Cultural History of Hinduism in the Classical Age. pp. 21–44. doi:10.5040/9781350024311.0007.
- Macdonnel, Arthur Anthony (1997). A Sanskrit Grammar for Students. Motilal Banarsidass. ISBN 81-246-0094-5.
- Monier-Williams, Monier. A Sanskrit Dictionary. Oxford Clarendon Press.
- Rajpopat, Rishi Atul (2021). In Pāṇini We Trust: Discovering the Algorithm for Rule Conflict Resolution in the Aṣṭādhāyī (PDF) (PhD dissertation). University of Cambridge. doi:10.17863/CAM.80099.
- Tibor Kiss (2015). Syntax – Theory and Analysis. Walter de Gruyter. ISBN 978-3-11-037740-8.
- Whitney, William Dwight (January 2008). Sanskrit Grammar (2000 ed.). Motilal Banarsidass. ISBN 978-81-208-0620-7.
