= T. S. Rukmani =

Sanskritist

Trichur Subramaniam Rukmani
- Born: 1930; Nemmara, Kerala, India
- Died: 2024 (aged 93–94); Bengaluru, India
- Occupations: professor, author, translator

Academic background
- Education: University of Delhi
- Thesis: A Critical Study of the Bhagavata Purana with special reference to Bhakti (1958)

Academic work
- Institutions: University of Delhi, University of Durban-Westville, Concordia University

Trichur Subramaniam Rukmani, often known as T. S. Rukmani, was a Sanskritist who served many years on the faculty of Concordia University (1996–2012) and retired in 2012. She was a prolific author on Indian Philosophy and translator of many Sanskrit texts into English. She died on November 24, 2024, in Bengaluru, India, at the age of 94.

== Biography ==
Rukmani was born in Kerala State, India. She received a B.A. in Sanskrit, Mathematics, Economics and English (University of Delhi, 1952), and M.A. and PhD degrees in Sanskrit (University of Delhi, 1954 and 1958). She later received an honorary Doctor of Literature (D.Litt.) degree from University of Delhi (1991) in recognition of her four-volume translation of a Sanskrit text called Yogavartiika of Vijnanabhiksu (1981–89), on Yoga philosophy by Vijnanabhiksu.

From 1964 to 1981 Rukmani served as Lecturer or Senior Lecturer at Indraprastha College, University of Delhi. From 1982 to 1993 she served as the Principal of Miranda House, University of Delhi. From 1993 to 1995, she served as Professor and Head of the Department of Hindu Studies and Indian Philosophy, University of Durban-Westville, in Durban, South Africa. From 1996 to 2012 she served as Professor and Chair of the Department of Hindu Studies at Concordia University in Montreal, Canada.

In the mid-1990s, Rukmani served as chief editor of the Journal of the Indological Society of Southern Africa and of Nidān: International Journal for Indian Studies, and has served on the boards of several other journals, such as the Journal of Hinduism and the Journal of Hindu Studies (Oxford).

In 2013, Rukmani was the subject of a festschrift.

== Selected works ==
- Rukmani, T. S. (2018). Kaṭhopaniṣat: with the commentary of Vijñānabhikṣu called Vedāntāloka. New Delhi: Munshiram Manoharlal. ISBN 9788121513227. OCLC 1059570515.
- Rukmani, T. S., ed. (2005). The Mahabharata: what is not here is nowhere else : (Yannehāsti na Tadkvacit). New Delhi: Munshiram Manoharlal Publishers. ISBN 978-81-215-1130-8. OCLC 62149232.
- Rukmani, T. S. (2001). Yogasūtrabhāṣyavivaraṇa of Śaṅkara: Vivaraṇa text with English translation, and critical notes along with text and English translation of Patañjali's Yogasūtras and Vyāsabhāṣya. New Delhi: Munshiram Manoharlal Publishers. ISBN 978-81-215-0908-4. OCLC 46352942
- Rukmani, T. S. (1994). Shankaracharya. New Delhi: Publications Division, Ministry of Information and Broadcasting, Govt. of India. ISBN 978-81-230-0063-3. OCLC 31900500. (freely downloadable)
- Rukmani, T. S. (1981). Yogavārttika of Vijñānabhikṣu: text, with English translation and critical notes, along with the text and English translation of the Pātañjala Yogasūtras and Vyāsabhāṣya. New Delhi: Munshiram Manoharlal. ISBN 9788121500562. OCLC 9969995
- Rukmani, T. S. (1970). A critical study of the Bhagavata Purana: (with special reference to Bhakti). Chowkhamba Sanskrit Series Office. OCLC 462838647
