= Kisari Mohan Ganguli =

Indian translator

Kisari Mohan Ganguli (also K. M. Ganguli) was an Indian translator known for being the first to provide a complete translation of the Sanskrit epic Mahabharata in English. His translation was published as The Mahabharata of Krishna-Dwaipayana Vyasa Translated into English Prose between 1883 and 1896, by Pratap Chandra Roy (1842–1895), a Calcutta bookseller who owned a printing press and raised funds for the project.

== Publication of the translation ==
The "Translator's Preface" in Book 1: Adi Parva, Ganguli mentions the sequence of events that led to the publication. Sometime in the early 1870s, Pratapa Chandra Roy, with Babu Durga Charan Banerjee, visited Ganguli at his home in Shibpur in Howrah, Bengal, requesting him to take up the translation project, which he took up after initial reluctance and a second meeting, when extensive plans were drawn, and the copy of a translation by Max Müller was left behind, made some thirty years ago, which on study Ganguli found to be literal and lacking in flow. Thus he started tweaking the text line by line, though "without at all impairing faithfulness to the original". Soon a dozen sheets of his first 'copy' were typed and sent to noted writers, both European and Indian, and only receiving a favorable response from them that the project was initiated.

Ganguli wanted to publish the translation anonymously, while Roy was against it. Ganguli believed that the project was too mammoth to be the work of a single person, and he might not live to complete the project and adding names of successive translators to appear on the title page was undesirable. Eventually, a compromise was reached, though the name of the translator was withheld on the cover, the first book of Adi Parva, that came out in 1883, was published with two prefaces, one over the signature of the publisher and the other headed--'Translator's Preface', to avoid any future confusions, when a reader might confuse the publisher for the author.

However, by the time Book 4 was released, the withholding of authorship did create controversy, as "an influential Indian journal" accused Pratap Chandra Roy of "posing before the world as the translator of Vyasa's work when, in fact, he was only the publisher". Roy immediately wrote a letter to clarify, citing the preface, but the confusion persisted for many years amongst readers who overlooked the preface. Once the complete eighteen books were successfully translated, the name was no longer withheld from the publication. More recently, the scholars to correct this discrepancy were Ronald Inden and Maureen Patterson, compilers of the University of Chicago's Bibliography to South Asian Studies, K. M. Knott in the Janus Press Edition of the first two books of the Mahabharata and A.C. Macdonnell.

The Ganguli English translation of the Mahabharata is the only complete edition in public domain - to date. His translation was reprinted by Munshiram Manoharlal Publishers.
