= Attock Bridge =

Bridge in Pakistan

Attock Bridge اٹک پل
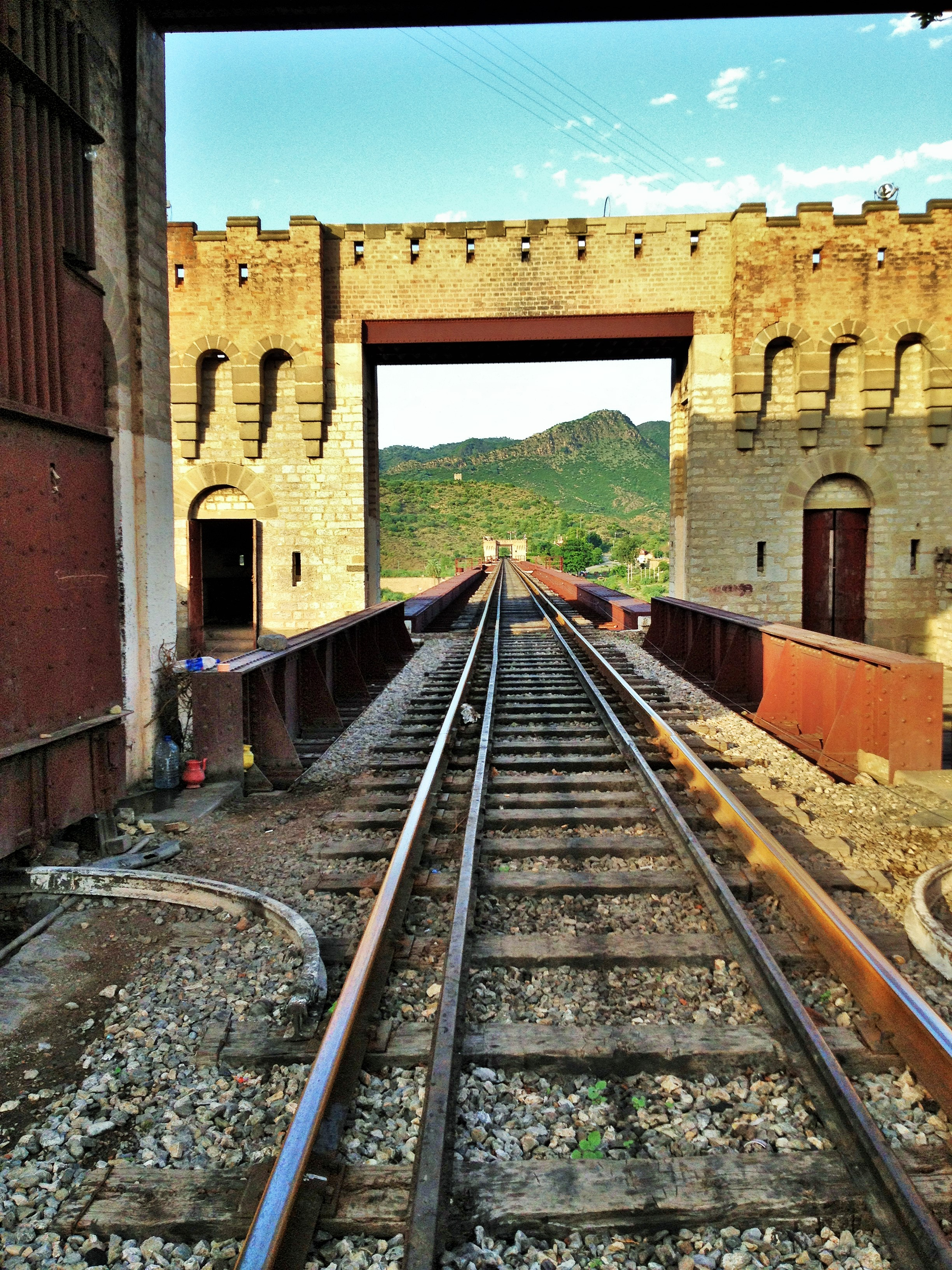
- Attock (Old) Bridge viewed from the south bank, 2015
- Coordinates: 33°52′21″N 72°14′12″E
- Carries: 1 railway track
- Crosses: Indus River
- Locale: Attock Khurd, Punjab, Pakistan – Khairabad Kund, Khyber Pakhtunkhwa
- Other name: Old Attock Bridge
- Named for: City of Attock
- Owner: Pakistan Railways
- Maintained by: Pakistan Railways
- Heritage status: Strategically fortified crossing of the Indus

Characteristics
- Design: Double-deck truss bridge
- Material: Wrought iron, masonry piers
- Total length: 425 m (1,394 ft)
- Longest span: 95 m (312 ft) and 78 m (256 ft)
- No. of spans: 5
- No. of lanes: 1 rail line

Rail characteristics
- No. of tracks: 1

History
- Designer: Guilford Lindsey Molesworth; Sir Francis Callaghan
- Constructed by: North-Western State Railway
- Construction start: 1880
- Construction end: 1883
- Opened: 24 May 1883
- Rebuilt: 1929

Location
- Interactive map of Attock Bridge

Attock Bridge (Urdu: اٹک پل) is a 19th-century railway bridge situated between Attock Khurd and Khairabad Kund on Indus River in Pakistan. It is commonly known as "Old Attock Bridge". This bridge is one of the most important strategic and commercial crossing on the Indus River between Punjab and Khyber Pakhtunkhwa provinces, hence was heavily fortified.

== History ==
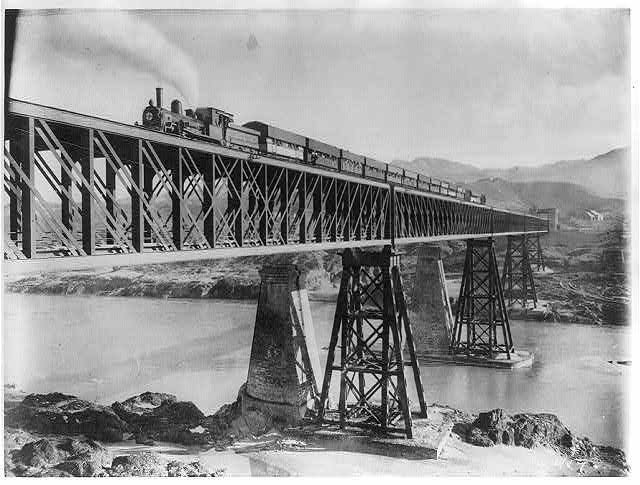
Attock Bridge 1895

Attock Bridge was designed by Sir Guildford Molesworth and was opened to traffic on 24 May 1883. The cost of construction was more than Rs 3.2 million.

The structure was redesigned by Sir Francis Callaghan and was reconstructed in 1929, at a cost of Rs 2.5 million. The bridge spanning over 425 metres (1,395 ft) has 2 levels and 5 spans, of which 3 spans are 78 metres (257 ft) long and 2 are 95 metres (312 ft) long. The upper level is used for railway traffic and the lower level for road traffic. The approaches to the bridge were built as solid fortifications - as a defense against raids from nearby Pashtun tribesmen.

This bridge was a part of Grand Trunk Road. In 1979 another bridge, known as "New Attock Bridge", was constructed and road traffic was shifted to it.
