= Pāṇini =

Ancient Sanskrit grammarian

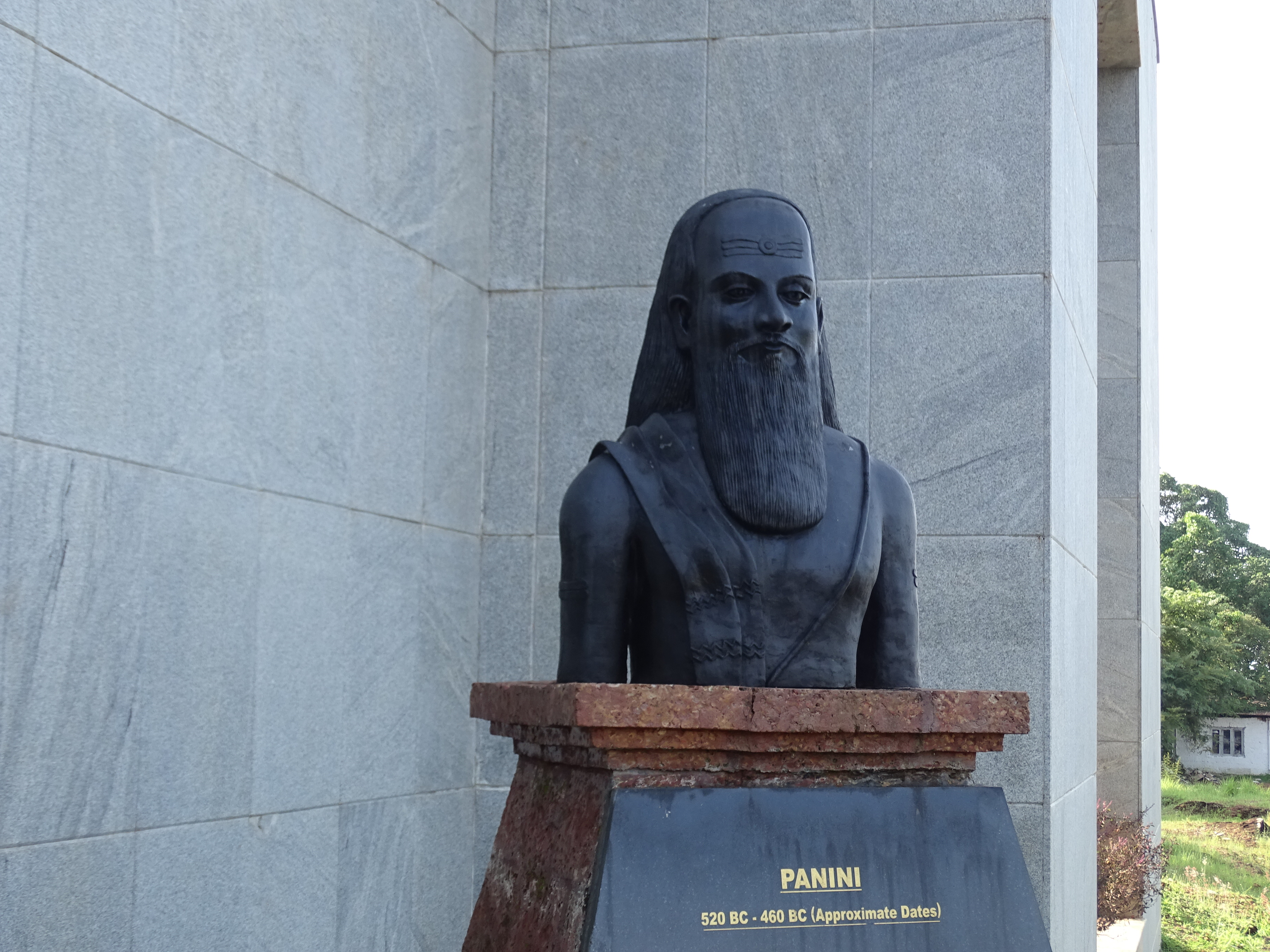
- Modern bust of Panini
- Born: Ancient India (Note: According to George Cardona, Sanskrit literary tradition believes that Pāṇini came from Salatura in the northwest part of the Indian subcontinent. This is likely to be ancient Gandhara.)

Philosophical work
- Era: fl. mid 1st-millennium BCE (Note: 4th century BCE date: Johannes Bronkhorst (2019): "Pāṇini's Aṣṭādhyāyī has been the target of much guesswork as to its date. Only recently have more serious proposals been made. Oskar von Hinüber (1990: 34) arrives, on the basis of a comparison of Pāṇini's text with numismatic findings, at a date that can hardly be much earlier than 350 BCE; Harry Falk (1993: 304; 1994: 327 n. 45) refines these reflections and moves the date forward to the decennia following 350 BCE. If Hinüber and Falk are right, and there seems no reason to doubt this, we have here for Pāṇini a terminus post quem.; Michael Witzel (2009): "c. 350 BCE"; George Cardona (1997): "The evidence for dating Panini, Kātyāyana and Patanjali is not absolutely probative and depends on interpretation. However, I think there is one certainty, namely that the evidence available hardly allows one to date Panini later than the early to mid fourth century B. C."; Frits Staal (1965): "fourth century B.C."; Houben (2009), p.6; Vergiani 2017, p. 243, n.4; 6th or 5th century BCE date: Frits Staal (1996): "the Sanskrit grammar of Panini (6th or 5th century b.c.e.)"; Hartmut Scharfe (1977): "Panini's date can be fixed only approximately; he must be older than Kātyāyana (c. 250 B.C.) who in his comments on Panini's work refers to other earlier scholars dealing with Panini's grammar; his proximity to the Vedic language as found in the Upanishads and Vedic sutras suggests the 5th or maybe 6th c. B.C." Scharfe refers to: Paul Thieme, Panini and the Veda (Allahabad, 1935), p. 75-81, OCLC 15644563."; Encyclopedia Britannica: "Ashtadhyayi, Sanskrit Aṣṭādhyāyī ("Eight Chapters"), Sanskrit treatise on grammar written in the 6th to 5th century BCE by the Indian grammarian Panini."; 7th to 5th century BCE date: Rens Bod (2013): "All we know is that he was born in Gandhara, in former India (currently Afghanistan), and that it must have been between the seventh and fifth centuries BCE." Bod refers to "S. Shukla, 'Panini', Encyclopedia of Language & Linguistics, 2nd edition, Elsevier, 2006. See also Paul Kiparsky, 'Paninian Linguistics', Encyclopedia of Language and Linguistics, 1st edition, Elsevier, 1993."); variously dated between 6th–5th century BCE and 4th century BCE
- Region: Indian philosophy
- Main interests: Grammar, linguistics
- Notable works: Aṣṭādhyāyī (Classical Sanskrit)
- Notable ideas: Descriptive linguistics

The greatest linguist of antiquity
Pāṇini.. was the greatest linguist of antiquity, and deserves to be treated as such.

— JF Staal, A reader on the Sanskrit Grammarians

Panini (Sanskrit: पाणिनि; IAST: Pāṇini) was an ancient Indian Sanskrit grammarian and linguist whose masterwork, the Aṣṭādhyāyī, is the foundational text of Vyākaraṇa (linguistics)—one of the six Vedāṅgas (auxiliary scholarly disciplines) of ancient Indian scholarship. He lived during the mid-1st millennium BCE, dated variously by most scholars between the 6th–5th and 4th centuries BCE.

The historical facts of his life are unknown, except only what can be inferred from his works, and legends recorded long after. His most notable work, the Ashtadhyayi (Aṣṭādhyāyī) (Devanagari: अष्टाध्यायी), is conventionally taken to mark the start of Classical Sanskrit. His work formally codified Classical Sanskrit as a refined and standardized language, making use of a technical metalanguage consisting of a syntax, morphology, and lexicon, organised according to a series of meta-rules. (Note: "The elegance and comprehensiveness of [the Aṣṭādhyāyī's] architecture have yet to be surpassed [...], and its ingenious methods of stratifying out use and mention, language and metalanguage, and theorem and metatheorem predate key discoveries in western philosophy by millennia.")

Since the exposure of European scholars to his Ashtadhyayi in the nineteenth century, Pāṇini has been considered the "first descriptive linguist", and even labelled as "the father of linguistics". His approach to grammar influenced such foundational linguists as Ferdinand de Saussure and Leonard Bloomfield.

== Biography ==
Father of linguistics
The history of linguistics begins not with Plato or Aristotle, but with the Indian grammarian Panini.

— Rens Bod, University of Amsterdam

The name Pāṇini is a patronymic meaning descendant of Paṇina. His full name was Dakṣiputra Pāṇini according to verses 1.75.13 and 3.251.12 of Patanjali's Mahābhāṣya, with the first part suggesting his mother's name was Dakṣi.

Some writers refer to Pāṇini as a Brahmin, but this remains uncertain as very little is known about him with any certainty: it is even unclear where and when he lived.

=== Dating ===
Pāṇini has been dated between the 7th or 6th and 4th century BCE.

In his survey of Pāṇini scholarship, George Cardona (1997) notes that available evidence strongly supports a date no earlier than 400 BCE, whereas earlier dates rely on interpretations that are not probative.

Based on numismatic findings, Oskar von Hinüber (1989) and Harry Falk (1993) place Pāṇini in the mid-4th century BCE. In several sūtras (Aṣṭādhyāyī 5.2.119, 5.2.120, 5.4.43, 4.3.153), Pāṇini references coins such as rūpya and niṣka (a specific gold coin), which numismatists date in India to the 4th century BCE. Jan Houben (2009) states that the date of "c. 350 BCE for Pāṇini is thus based on unrefuted concrete evidence." Similarly, Johannes Bronkhorst (2016) accepts Von Hinüber's and Falk's argument, establishing a terminus post quem (Note: The earliest time or historical period during which an event may have happened) for Pāṇini around 350 BCE or the decades thereafter. According to Bronkhorst,

...thanks to the work carried out by Hinüber (1990:34-35) and Falk (1993: 303-304), we now know that Pāṇini lived, in all probability, far closer in time to the period of Aśoka than had hitherto been thought. According to Falk's reasoning, Panini must have lived during the decade following 350 BCE, that is, just before (or contemporaneously with?) the invasion by Alexander of Macedonia.

Although scholars debate whether Pāṇini composed his work in writing, it is generally agreed that he knew of script based on references to words such as lipi ("script") and lipikara ("scribe") in section 3.2 of the Aṣṭādhyāyī. Consequently, the introduction of writing in ancient India provides a key marker for this chronology. (Note: Pāṇini's use of the term lipi has been a source of scholarly disagreements. Harry Falk in his 1993 overview states that ancient Indians neither knew nor used writing scripts, and Pāṇini's mention is likely a reference to Semitic and Greek scripts. In his 1995 review, Salomon questions Falk's arguments and writes it is "speculative at best and hardly constitutes firm grounds for a late date for Kharoṣṭhī. The stronger argument for this position is that we have no specimen of the script before the time of Aśoka, nor any direct evidence of intermediate stages in its development; but of course this does not mean that such earlier forms did not exist, only that, if they did exist, they have not survived, presumably because they were not employed for monumental purposes before Aśoka". According to Hartmut Scharfe, the Lipi of Pāṇini may have been borrowed from the Old Persian Dipi, in turn derived from the Sumerian Dup. Scharfe adds that the best evidence, at the time of his review, is that no script was used in India, aside from the Northwest Indian subcontinent, before around 300 BCE because Indian tradition "at every occasion stresses the orality of the cultural and literary heritage." Kenneth Norman states that writing scripts in ancient India evolved over long periods of time like other cultures, that it is unlikely that ancient Indians developed a single complete writing system at one and the same time in the Mauryan era. It is even less likely, states Norman, that a writing script was invented during Ashoka's rule, starting from nothing, for the specific purpose of writing his inscriptions and then it was understood all over South Asia where the Aśoka pillars are found. Jack Goody states that ancient India likely had a "very old culture of writing" along with its oral tradition of composing and transmitting knowledge, because the corpus of Vedic literature is too vast, consistent and complex to have been entirely created, memorized, accurately preserved and spread without a written system. Falk disagrees with Goody, and suggests that it is a Western presumption and inability to imagine that remarkably early scientific achievements such as Pāṇini's grammar (5th to 4th century BCE), and the creation, preservation and wide distribution of the large corpus of the Brahmanic Vedic literature and the Buddhist canonical literature were possible without any writing scripts. Johannes Bronkhorst disagrees with Falk, and states, "Falk goes too far. It is fair to expect that we believe that Vedic memorisation — though without parallel in any other human society — has been able to preserve very long texts for many centuries without losing a syllable. (...) However, the oral composition of a work as complex as Pāṇini's grammar is not only without parallel in other human cultures, it is without parallel in India itself. (...) It just will not do to state that our difficulty in conceiving any such thing is our problem".) Vincenzo Vergiani argues that the nature, structure, and complexity of the grammar, including its binary classification of syllable lengths, offer evidence for its composition and transmission through written means.

Pāṇini cites at least ten earlier grammarians and linguists: Āpiśali, Kāśyapa, Gārgya, Gālava, Cākravarmaṇa, Bhāradvāja, Śākaṭāyana, Śākalya, Senaka, Sphoṭāyana, and Yaska. Kamal K. Misra notes that Pāṇini references Yaska's Nirukta, "whose writings date back to the mid-4th century BCE".

The Sanskrit epic Brihatkatha and the Buddhist scripture Mañjuśrī-mūla-kalpa both describe Pāṇini as a contemporary of king Dhana Nanda (r. 329–321 BCE), the last monarch of the Nanda Empire before Chandragupta Maurya came to power.

Cardona offers an earlier date for Pāṇini, noting that the compound word yavanānī, discussed in sutra 4.1.49 has been interpreted as referring to either to Old Persian cuneiform, Greek script, or Ionian women, with whom contact may have predated the conquests of Darius I (c. 518 BCE) or Alexander (326 BCE). (Note: In 1862 Max Müller argued that yavana may have meant "Greek" (Note: Ionian) during Pāṇinis time, but may also refer to Semitic or dark-skinned Indian people.) K. B. Pathak (1930) argues that the kumāraśramaṇa (sūtra 2.1.70)—referring to female renunciates (śramaṇa)—could also refer to Jain Āryikā, potentially placing Pāṇini prior to Gautama Buddha in the 5th century BCE. Other scholars assign his work to the 6th or 5th century BCE on linguistic grounds:

- Rens Bod notes that as Pāṇini's grammar codifies Classical Sanskrit, he is placed in the late Vedic period (c. 7th–5th century BCE).
- According to A. B. Keith, the Sanskrit text closest to Pāṇini's linguistic profile is the Aitareya Brāhmaṇa (c. 8th–6th century BCE).
- According to Harmut Scharfe, "Pāṇini's proximity to the language of the Upanishads and Vedic sūtras suggests a 5th or 6th century BCE date."
- According to Rocher and Laddu (July 1977), the strongest reference point for the dating of the Aṣṭādhyāyī is Patanjali's Mahabhashya, believed to be composed in the late Maurya Empire (321-185 BCE), which cites Panini's Ashtadhyayi as a reference, pushing the date of Panini's before 321 BCE. Additionally, the discontinuation of late-Vedic Sanskrit used by Pāṇini in the Mauryan period, alongside its differences from Patanjali's classical Sanskrit, supports an earlier dating for Pāṇini, placing his life in the late-Vedic era, between the 6th and 7th century BCE.

=== Location ===
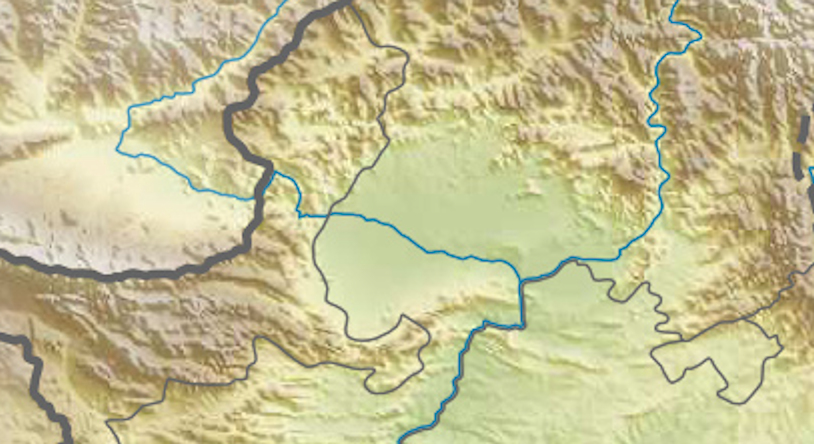
Approximate location of Salatura in Gandhara, in present-day northern Pakistan

Nothing certain is known about Pāṇini's personal life. In later epigraphical evidence, such as the 8th-century copper-plate inscriptions of Siladitya VII of the Maitraka dynasty of Vallabhi, he is called Śalāturiya (a man from Salatura), identifying his native place with ancient town of Salatura in Gandhara. This means Pāṇini lived in Salatura in ancient Gandhara, which likely was near Lahor (present day northwest Pakistan), a town at the junction of the Indus and Kabul rivers. (Note: now a part of the Swabi District of modern Pakistan) According to the memoirs of the 7th-century Chinese scholar Xuanzang, there was a town called Suoluoduluo on the Indus where Pāṇini was born, and where he composed the Qingming-lun (Sanskrit: Vyākaraṇa).

According to Hartmut Scharfe, Pāṇini lived in Gandāra during a period when it was nominally a satrapy of the Achaemenid Empire following the 6th century BCE conquest of Indus Valley. However Pāṇini’s work shows no influence from Old Persian. His geographical horizon in the Aṣṭādhyāyī remains centered on the Indian subcontinent (Āryāvarta and the Northwest).

=== Legends and later reception ===
According to legends in the Kathāsaritsāgara, Pāṇini studied under his guru Varsha in Pataliputra (modern Patna). Considered a slow student, he followed the advice of Varsha's wife and travelled to the Himalayas to perform penance and seek wisdom from Shiva. Shiva appeared, performed a cosmic dance, and played his damaru, producing the foundational sounds of Sanskrit. Pāṇini compiled these into Shiva Sutras. Equiped with this knowledge, Pāṇini returned to Pataliputra. At that time, Vararuchi, another disciple of Varsha, had learned grammar from Indra. They engaged in a debate which lasted eight days and on the last day, with Vararuchi emerging dominant, Pāṇini won when Shiva destroyed Vararuchi's work. Pāṇini went on to defeat the rest of Varsha's disciples and emerged as the foremost grammarian.

According to tradition, Pāṇini spent much of his life in Pataliputra, with some scholars suggesting his family had previously migrated there from Salatura. Other traditions associate Pāṇini with the University of Taxila.

Pāṇini also appears in traditional Indian fables and other ancient texts. The Panchatantra, for example, records a story in which Pāṇini was killed by a lion.

According to some historians, āchārya Pingala was the brother of Pāṇini.

Pāṇini was depicted on a five-rupee Indian postage stamp in August 2004.

== Ashtadhyayi ==
Pāṇini's principal work, the Aṣṭādhyāyī, is a treatise on Sanskrit grammar. The grammar is descriptive and generative, using concise, rule-based formulas to define phonology, morphology and syntax. It is supplemented by three ancillary texts: the akṣarasamāmnāya, dhātupāṭha (Note: dhātu: root, pāṭha: reading, lesson) and gaṇapāṭha. (Note: gaṇa: class) While it is based on the spoken dialect of educated speakers of his era, the text also accounts for archaic form found in Vedic Sanskrit.

Developed out of earlier efforts to preserve the linguistic accuracy of Vedic hymns, the Aṣṭādhyāyī systematized rules to standardize the language and prevent dialectal drift. Although earlier grammatical works existed, the Aṣtādhyāyī is the earliest Sanskrit grammar work that survives intact.

The Ashtadhyayi consists of 3,959 sūtras (Note: aphoristic threads) organized into eight chapters (adhyāyas), which are each subdivided into four sections or pādas. The text takes material from lexical lists (dhātupāṭha, gaṇapātha) as input and describes the algorithms to be applied to them for the generation of well-formed words. Such is its intricacy that the correct application of its rules and metarules is still being worked out centuries later. As a generative grammatical system, it operates with an integrated framework and rules:

- Śiva Sūtras (Akṣarasamāmnāya): A phonological framework establishing the phonetic system that produces succinct operational abbreviations (pratyāhāras).
- Dhātupāṭha: A supporting vocabulary highlighting verbal roots and their meaning.
- Gaṇapāṭha: Catalogs of nouns represented in a way that can help with the morphological transformation of language.
- Paribhāṣā Sūtras: A collection of metarule illustrating the way of solving conflicting rules.

The Ashtadhyayi, composed in an era when oral composition and transmission was the norm, is staunchly embedded in that oral tradition. In order to ensure wide dissemination, Pāṇini is said to have preferred brevity over clarity—it can be recited end-to-end in two hours. This has led to the emergence of a great number of commentaries (Note: bhāṣyas) of his work over the centuries, which for the most part adhere to the foundations laid by Pāṇini's work.

== Legacy ==
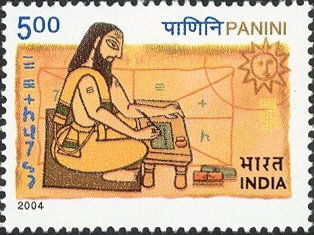
Stamp of India depicting Pāṇini (2004)

Pāṇini is known for his text Ashtadhyayi, a sutra-style treatise on Sanskrit grammar, which consists of 3,996 verses or rules on linguistics, syntax and semantics in "eight chapters" which is the foundational text of the Vyākaraṇa branch of the Vedanga, the auxiliary scholarly disciplines of the Vedic period. His aphoristic text attracted numerous bhashya (commentaries), of which the Mahabhashya by Patanjali is the most famous. His ideas influenced and attracted commentaries from scholars of other Indian religions such as Buddhism.

Pāṇini's analysis of noun compounds still forms the basis of modern linguistic theories of compounding in Indian languages. Pāṇini's comprehensive and scientific theory of grammar is conventionally taken to mark the start of Classical Sanskrit. His systematic treatise inspired and made Sanskrit the preeminent Indian language of learning and literature for two millennia.

Pāṇini's theory of morphological analysis was more advanced than any equivalent Western theory before the 20th century. His treatise is generative and descriptive, uses metalanguage and meta-rules, and has been compared to the Turing machine wherein the logical structure of any computing device has been reduced to its essentials using an idealized mathematical model.

=== Bhaṭṭikāvya and Pedagogical Influence ===
Pāṇini's grammatical rules directly shaped later Sanskrit classical literature (Kāvya) and pedagogy. A prominent example is the Bhaṭṭikāvya, composed centuries later by the poet Bhaṭṭi as a dual purpose work; A poem narrating the Rāmāyaṇa while systematically illustrating Pāṇini's grammatical rules.

Indian curriculums in the late classical era had at their core a system of grammatical study and linguistic analysis. The core text for this study was the Ashtadhyayi of Pāṇini, the sine qua non of learning. This grammar of Pāṇini had been the object of intense study for the ten centuries prior to the composition of the Bhaṭṭikāvya. It was Bhaṭṭi's purpose to provide a study aid to Pāṇini's text by using the examples already provided in the existing grammatical commentaries in the context of the Rāmāyaṇa. The intention of the author was to teach this advanced science through a relatively easy and pleasant medium. In his own words:

This composition is like a lamp to those who perceive the meaning of words and like a hand mirror for a blind man to those without grammar.

This poem, which is to be understood by means of a commentary, is a joy to those sufficiently learned: through my fondness for the scholar I have here slighted the dullard.

Bhaṭṭikāvya 22.33–34.

== Modern linguistics ==
Pāṇini's work became known in 19th-century Europe, where it influenced modern linguistics initially through Franz Bopp. Subsequently, a wider body of work influenced Sanskrit scholars such as Ferdinand de Saussure, Leonard Bloomfield, and Roman Jakobson. Frits Staal discussed the impact of Indian ideas on language in Europe. After outlining the various aspects of the contact, Staal notes that the idea of formal rules in language – proposed by Ferdinand de Saussure in 1894 and developed by Noam Chomsky in 1957 – has origins in the European exposure to the formal rules of Pāṇinian grammar. In particular, de Saussure, who lectured on Sanskrit for three decades, may have been influenced by Pāṇini and Bhartrihari; his idea of the unity of the signifier-signified in the sign somewhat resembles the notion of Sphoṭa. More importantly, the very idea that formal rules can be applied to areas outside of logic or mathematics may itself have been catalysed by Europe's contact with the work of Sanskrit grammarians.

=== De Saussure ===
Pāṇini, and the later Indian linguist Bhartrihari, had a significant influence on many of the foundational ideas proposed by Ferdinand de Saussure, professor of Sanskrit, who is widely considered the father of modern structural linguistics and with Charles S. Peirce on the other side, to semiotics, although the concept Saussure used was semiology. Saussure himself cited Indian grammar as an influence on some of his ideas. In his Mémoire sur le système primitif des voyelles dans les langues indo-européennes (Memoir on the Original System of Vowels in the Indo-European Languages) published in 1879, he mentions Indian grammar as an influence on his idea that "reduplicated aorists represent imperfects of a verbal class." In his De l'emploi du génitif absolu en sanscrit (On the Use of the Genitive Absolute in Sanskrit) published in 1881, he specifically mentions Pāṇini as an influence on the work.

Prem Singh, in his foreword to the reprint edition of the German translation of Pāṇini's Grammar in 1998, concluded that the "effect Pāṇini's work had on Indo-European linguistics shows itself in various studies" and that a "number of seminal works come to mind," including Saussure's works and the analysis that "gave rise to the laryngeal theory," further stating: "This type of structural analysis suggests influence from Pāṇini's analytical teaching." George Cardona, however, warns against overestimating the influence of Pāṇini on modern linguistics: "Although Saussure also refers to predecessors who had taken this Pāṇinian rule into account, it is reasonable to conclude that he had a direct acquaintance with Pāṇini's work. As far as I am able to discern upon rereading Saussure's Mémoire, however, it shows no direct influence of Pāṇinian grammar. Indeed, on occasion, Saussure follows a path that is contrary to Pāṇinian procedure."

=== Comparison with modern formal systems ===
Pāṇini's grammar has been described as "the first context-sensitive formal model of language", showing "many features of a formal, computationally implementable system" comparable to the modern Backus–Naur form. It is a rigorous formal system developed well before the 19th century innovations of Gottlob Frege and the subsequent development of mathematical logic.

In designing his grammar, Pāṇini used the method of codifying rules through use of auxiliary markers, in which affixes are designated to mark syntactic categories and the control of grammatical derivations through replacement rules (e.g.: "what to do if a stem is marked as a past tense verb, what to do if a noun is marked as an instrumental object, how to indicate passive versus active, what sound adjustments to make for adjacent phonemes, and so forth"). This technique has been compared to the rewrite systems developed in the 1920s-1930s by the logician Emil Post, which became a standard method in the design of computer programming languages. Sanskritists now accept that Pāṇini's linguistic apparatus is well-described as an "applied" Post system. Considerable evidence shows ancient mastery of context-sensitive grammars, and a general ability to solve many complex problems.

Frits Staal has written that "Pāṇini is the Indian Euclid" and that the ancient Indian grammarians, especially Pāṇini, had mastered methods of linguistic theory not rediscovered again until the 1950s and the applications of modern mathematical logic to linguistics by Noam Chomsky. (Chomsky himself has said that the first generative grammar in the modern sense was Pāṇini's grammar).

== Other works ==
Two literary works are attributed to Pāṇini, though they are now lost.

- The Jāmbavati Vijaya is a lost epic poem cited by Rajashekhara in Jalhana's Sukti Muktāvalī. A fragment of this work can be found in Ramayukta's commentary on the Namalinganushasana. The title suggests that the work dealt with Krishna's winning of Jambavati from the underworld as his bride. Rajashekhara is quoted thus in Jalhana's Sukti Muktāvalī:

नमः पाणिनये तस्मै यस्मादाविर भूदिह।
आदौ व्याकरणं काव्यमनु जाम्बवतीजयम्॥
namaḥ pāṇinaye tasmai yasmādāvirabhūdiha।
ādau vyākaraṇaṃ kāvyamanu jāmbavatījayam॥

- Ascribed to Pāṇini, the Pātāla Vijaya (Victory in/over the Underworld) is a lost work cited by Namisadhu in his commentary on the Kavyalankara (Poetic Aesthetics) of Rudrata. The Pātāla Vijaya is considered the same work as the Jāmbavati Vijaya by Moriz Winternitz.

There are many proto-mathematical concepts found in Pāṇini's works. Pāṇini came up with a plethora of ideas to organize the known grammatical forms of his day in a systematic way. Like any mathematician who models a known phenomenon in mathematical language, Pāṇini created a metalanguage which is very close to the modern-day ideas of algebra.

== See also ==
- List of Indian mathematicians
- Pingala
- Seṭ and aniṭ roots
- Tolkāppiyam

== Sources ==
- Bhate, Saroja; Kak, Subhash (1993). "Panini's Grammar and Computer Science" (PDF). Annals of the Bhandarkar Oriental Research Institute. 72.
- Bod, Rens (2013), A New History of the Humanities: The Search for Principles and Patterns from Antiquity to the Present, Oxford University Press, ISBN 978-0-19-966521-1
- Bronkhorst, Johannes (2016), How the Brahmins Won: From Alexander to the Guptas, Brill, ISBN 978-90-04-31551-8
- Bronkhorst, Johannes (2019), A Śabda Reader: Language in Classical Indian Thought, Columbia University Press, ISBN 978-0-231-54831-1
- Cardona, George (1997) [1976], Pāṇini: A Survey of Research, Motilal Banarsidass, ISBN 978-81-208-1494-3
- Harold G. Coward (1990). Potter, Karl (ed.). The Philosophy of the Grammarians, in Encyclopedia of Indian Philosophies Volume 5. Princeton University Press. ISBN 978-81-208-0426-5.
- Houben, Jan E. M. (2009). "Panini's Grammar and Its Computerization: A Construction Grammar Approach". Sanskrit Computational Linguistics. Springer. pp. 6–25. ISBN 978-3-540-93884-2.
- François, Alexandre; Ponsonnet, Maïa (2013). "Descriptive linguistics" (PDF). In Jon R. McGee; Richard L. Warms (eds.). Theory in Social and Cultural Anthropology: An Encyclopedia. Vol. 1. SAGE Publications. pp. 184–187. ISBN 978-1-4129-9963-2.
- Kadvany, John (2007). "Positional Value and Linguistic Recursion". Journal of Indian Philosophy. 35 (5–6): 487–520. doi:10.1007/s10781-007-9025-5. S2CID 52885600.
- Lidova, Natalia (1994), Drama and Ritual of Early Hinduism, Motilal Banarsidass, ISBN 978-81-208-1234-5
- Lochtefeld, James G. (2002), The Illustrated Encyclopedia of Hinduism: A-M, The Rosen Publishing Group, ISBN 978-0-8239-3179-8
- Misra, Kamal K. (2000), Textbook of Anthropological Linguistics, Concept Publishing Company, ISBN 81-7022-819-0
- T. R. N. Rao. Pāṇini-backus form of languages. 1998.
- Scharfe, Hartmut (1977), Grammatical Literature, Otto Harrassowitz Verlag, ISBN 978-3-447-01706-0
- Staal, Frits (April 1965), "Euclid and Pāṇini", Philosophy East and West, 15 (2): 99–116, doi:10.2307/1397332, JSTOR 1397332
- Staal, Frits (1972). A Reader on the Sanskrit Grammarians. MIT Press. ISBN 0-262-19078-8.
- Staal, Frits (1996), Ritual and Mantras: Rules Without Meaning, Motilal Banarsidass, ISBN 978-81-208-1412-7
- Tiwary, Kapil Muni 1968 Pāṇini's description of nominal compounds, University of Pennsylvania doctoral dissertation. Janaki Prakashan: Patna. OCLC 12868577
- Vergiani, Vincenzo (2017), "Bhartrhari on Language, Perception, and Consciousness", in Ganeri, Jonardon (ed.), The Oxford Handbook of Indian Philosophy, Oxford University Press, ISBN 978-0-19-931463-8
- Witzel, Michael (2009), "Moving Targets? Texts, language, archaeology and history in the Late Vedic and early Buddhist periods", Indo-Iranian Journal, 52 (2–3): 287–310, doi:10.1163/001972409X12562030836859, S2CID 154283219
