= History of linguistics =

Linguistics is the scientific study of language, involving analysis of language form, language meaning, and language in context.

Language use was first systematically documented in Mesopotamia, with extant lexical lists of the 3rd to the 2nd Millennia BCE (3000 to 1000 BCE), offering glossaries on Sumerian cuneiform usage and meaning, and phonetical vocabularies of foreign languages. Later, Sanskrit would be systematically analysed, and its rules described, by Pāṇini (fl. 6-4th century BCE (600 to 300 BCE)), in the Indus Valley. Beginning around the 4th century BCE, Warring States period China also developed its own grammatical traditions. Aristotle laid the foundation of Western linguistics as part of the study of rhetoric in his Poetics c. 335 BC. Traditions of Arabic grammar and Hebrew grammar developed during the Middle Ages in a religious context like Pānini's Sanskrit grammar.

Modern approaches began to develop in the 18th century, eventually being regarded in the 19th century as belonging to the disciplines of psychology or biology, with such views establishing the foundation of mainstream Anglo-American linguistics, although in England philological approaches such as that of Henry Sweet tended to predominate. This was contested in the early 20th century by Ferdinand de Saussure, who established linguistics as an autonomous discipline within social sciences. Following Saussure's concept, general linguistics consists of the study of language as a semiotic system, which includes the subfields of phonology, morphology, syntax, and semantics. Each of these subfields can be approached either synchronically or diachronicially.

Today, linguistics encompasses a large number of scientific approaches and has developed still more subfields, including applied linguistics, psycholinguistics, neurolinguistics, sociolinguistics, and computational linguistics.

== Antiquity ==
Across cultures, the early history of linguistics is associated with a need to disambiguate discourse, especially for ritual texts or arguments. This often led to explorations of sound-meaning mappings, and the debate over conventional versus naturalistic origins for these symbols. Finally, this led to the processes by which larger structures are formed from units.

=== Babylonia ===
The earliest linguistic texts – written in cuneiform on clay tablets – date almost four thousand years before the present. In the early centuries of the second millennium BCE, in southern Mesopotamia, there arose a grammatical tradition that lasted more than 2,500 years. The linguistic texts from the earliest parts of the tradition were lists of nouns in Sumerian (a language isolate, that is, a language with no known genetic relatives), the language of religious and legal texts at the time. Sumerian was being replaced in everyday speech by a very different (and unrelated) language, Akkadian; it remained however as a language of prestige and continued to be used in religious and legal contexts. It therefore had to be taught as a foreign language, and to facilitate this, information about Sumerian was recorded in writing by Akkadian-speaking scribes.

Over the centuries, the lists became standardised, and the Sumerian words were provided with Akkadian translations. Ultimately texts emerged that gave Akkadian equivalents for not just single words, but for entire paradigms of varying forms for words: one text, for instance, has 227 different forms of the verb ĝar "to place".

=== India ===
Linguistics in ancient India derives its impetus from the need to correctly recite and interpret the Vedic texts. Already in the oldest Indian text, the Rigveda, vāk ("speech") is deified. By 1200 BCE, the oral performance of these texts becomes standardized, and treatises on ritual recitation suggest splitting up the Sanskrit compounds into words, stems, and phonetic units, providing an impetus for morphology and phonetics.

Some of the earliest activities in the description of language have been attributed to the Indian grammarian Pāṇini (6th century BCE), who wrote a rule-based description of the Sanskrit language in his Aṣṭādhyāyī.

Over the next few centuries, clarity was reached in the organization of sound units, and the stop consonants were organized in a 5x5 square (c. 800 BCE, Pratisakhyas), eventually leading to a systematic alphabet, Brāhmī, by the 3rd century BCE.

In semantics, the early Sanskrit grammarian Śākaṭāyana (before c. 500 BCE) proposes that verbs represent ontologically prior categories, and that all nouns are etymologically derived from actions. The etymologist Yāska (c. 5th century BCE) posits that meaning inheres in the sentence, and that word meanings are derived based on sentential usage. He also provides four categories of words—nouns, verbs, pre-verbs, and particles/invariants—and a test for nouns both concrete and abstract: words which can be indicated by the pronoun that.

Pāṇini (c. 6th century BCE) opposes the Yāska view that sentences are primary, and proposes a grammar for composing semantics from morphemic roots. Transcending the ritual text to consider living language, Pāṇini specifies a comprehensive set of about 4,000 aphoristic rules (sutras) that:

1. Map the semantics of verb argument structures into thematic roles
2. Provide morphosyntactic rules for creating verb forms and nominal forms whose seven cases are called karaka (similar to case) that generate the morphology
3. Take these morphological structures and consider phonological processes (e.g., root or stem modification) by which the final phonological form is obtained

In addition, the Pāṇinian school also provides a list of 2000 verb roots which form the objects on which these rules are applied, a list of sounds (the so-called Shiva-sutras), and a list of 260 words not derivable by the rules.

The extremely succinct specification of these rules and their complex interactions led to considerable commentary and extrapolation over the following centuries. The phonological structure includes defining a notion of sound universals similar to the modern phoneme, the systematization of consonants based on oral cavity constriction, and vowels based on height and duration. However, it is the ambition of mapping these from morpheme to semantics that is truly remarkable in modern terms.

Grammarians following Pāṇini include Kātyāyana (c. 3rd century BCE), who wrote aphorisms on Pāṇini (the Varttika) and advanced mathematics; Patañjali (2nd century BCE), known for his commentary on selected topics in Pāṇini's grammar (the Mahabhasya) and on Kātyāyana's aphorisms, as well as, according to some, the author of the Yoga Sutras, and Pingala, with his mathematical approach to prosody. Several debates ranged over centuries, for example, on whether word-meaning mappings were conventional (Vaisheshika-Nyaya) or eternal (Kātyāyana-Patañjali-Mīmāṃsā).

The Nyaya Sutras specified three types of meaning: the individual (this cow), the type universal (cowhood), and the image (draw the cow). That the sound of a word also forms a class (sound-universal) was observed by Bhartṛhari (c. 500 CE), who also posits that language-universals are the units of thought, close to the nominalist or even the linguistic determinism position. Bhartṛhari also considers the sentence to be ontologically primary (word meanings are learned given their sentential use).

Of the six canonical texts or Vedangas that formed the core syllabus in Brahminic education from the 1st century CE until the 18th century, four dealt with language:

- Shiksha (śikṣā): phonetics and phonology (sandhi), Gārgeya and commentators
- Chandas (chandas): prosody or meter, Pingala and commentators
- Vyakarana (vyākaraṇa): grammar, Pāṇini and commentators
- Nirukta (nirukta): etymology, Yāska and commentators

Bhartrihari around 500 CE introduced a philosophy of meaning with his sphoṭa doctrine.

Pāṇini's rule-based method of linguistic analysis and description has remained relatively unknown to Western linguistics until more recently. Franz Bopp used Pāṇini's work as a linguistic source for his 1807 Sanskrit grammar but disregarded his methodology. Pāṇini's system also differs from modern formal linguistics in that, since Sanskrit is a free word-order language, it did not provide syntactic rules. Formal linguistics, as first proposed by Louis Hjelmslev in 1943, is nonetheless based on the same concept that the expression of meaning is organised on different layers of linguistic form (including phonology and morphology).

The Pali Grammar of Kacchayana, dated to the early centuries CE, describes the language of the Buddhist canon.

=== Greece ===
The Greeks developed an alphabet using symbols from the Phoenicians, adding signs for vowels and for extra consonants appropriate to their idiom (see Robins, 1997). In the Phoenicians and in earlier Greek writing systems, such as Linear B, graphemes indicated syllables, that is sound combinations of a consonant and a vowel. The addition of vowels by the Greeks was a major breakthrough as it facilitated the writing of Greek by representing both vowels and consonants with distinct graphemes. As a result of the introduction of writing, poetry such as the Homeric poems became written and several editions were created and commented on, forming the basis of philology and criticism.

Along with written speech, the Greeks commenced studying grammatical and philosophical issues. A philosophical discussion about the nature and origins of language can be found as early as the works of Plato. A subject of concern was whether language was man-made, a social artifact, or supernatural in origin. Plato in his Cratylus presents the naturalistic view, that word meanings emerge from a natural process, independent of the language user. His arguments are partly based on examples of compounding, where the meaning of the whole is usually related to the constituents, although by the end he admits a small role for convention. The sophists and Socrates introduced dialectics as a new text genre. The Platonic dialogs contain definitions of the meters of the poems and tragedy, the form and the structure of those texts (see the Republic and Phaidros, Ion, etc.).

Aristotle supports the conventional origins of meaning. He defined the logic of speech and of the argument. Furthermore, Aristotle's works on rhetoric and poetics became of the utmost importance for the understanding of tragedy, poetry, public discussions etc. as text genres. Aristotle's work on logic interrelates with his special interest in language, and his work on this area was fundamentally important for the development of the study of language (logos in Greek means both "language" and "logic reasoning"). In Categories, Aristotle defines what is meant by "synonymous" or univocal words, what is meant by "homonymous" or equivocal words, and what is meant by "paronymous" or denominative words. He divides forms of speech as being:

- Either simple, without composition or structure, such as "man," "horse," "fights," etc.
- Or having composition and structure, such as "a man fights," "the horse runs," etc.

Next, he distinguishes between a subject of predication, namely that of which anything is affirmed or denied, and a subject of inhesion. A thing is said to be inherent in a subject, when, though it is not a part of the subject, it cannot possibly exist without the subject, e.g., shape in a thing having a shape. The categories are not abstract platonic entities but are found in speech, these are substance, quantity, quality, relation, place, time, position, state, action and affection. In de Interpretatione, Aristotle analyzes categoric propositions, and draws a series of basic conclusions on the routine issues of classifying and defining basic linguistic forms, such as simple terms and propositions, nouns and verbs, negation, the quantity of simple propositions (primitive roots of the quantifiers in modern symbolic logic), investigations on the excluded middle (which to Aristotle isn't applicable to future tense propositions — the Problem of future contingents), and on modal propositions.

The Stoics made linguistics an important part of their system of the cosmos and the human. They played an important role in defining the linguistic sign-terms adopted later on by Ferdinand de Saussure like "significant" and "signifié". The Stoics studied phonetics, grammar and etymology as separate levels of study. In phonetics and phonology the articulators were defined. The syllable became an important structure for the understanding of speech organization. One of the most important contributions of the Stoics in language study was the gradual definition of the terminology and theory echoed in modern linguistics.

Alexandrian grammarians also studied speech sounds and prosody; they defined parts of speech with notions such as "noun", "verb", etc. There was also a discussion about the role of analogy in language, in this discussion the grammatici in Alexandria supported the view that language and especially morphology is based on analogy or paradigm, whereas the grammatic in schools in Asia Minor consider that language is not based on analogical bases but rather on exceptions.

Alexandrians, like their predecessors, were very interested in meter and its role in poetry. The metrical "feet" in the Greek was based on the length of time taken to pronounce each syllable, with syllables categorized according to their weight as either "long" syllables or "short" syllables (also known as "heavy" and "light" syllables, respectively, to distinguish them from long and short vowels). The foot is often compared to a musical measure and the long and short syllables to whole notes and half notes. The basic unit in Greek and Latin prosody is a mora, which is defined as a single short syllable. A long syllable is equivalent to two moras. A long syllable contains either a long vowel, a diphthong, or a short vowel followed by two or more consonants.

Various rules of elision sometimes prevent a grammatical syllable from making a full syllable, and certain other lengthening and shortening rules (such as correption) can create long or short syllables in contexts where one would expect the opposite. The most important Classical meter as defined by the Alexandrian grammarians was the dactylic hexameter, the meter of Homeric poetry. This form uses verses of six feet. The first four feet are normally dactyls, but can be spondees. The fifth foot is almost always a dactyl. The sixth foot is either a spondee or a trochee. The initial syllable of either foot is called the ictus, the basic "beat" of the verse. There is usually a caesura after the ictus of the third foot.

The text Tékhnē grammatiké (c. 100 BCE, Gk. gramma meant letter, and this title means "Art of letters"), possibly written by Dionysius Thrax (170 – 90 BCE), is considered the earliest grammar book in the Greek tradition. It lists eight parts of speech and lays out the broad details of Greek morphology including the case structures. This text was intended as a pedagogic guide (as was Panini), and also covers punctuation and some aspects of prosody. Other grammars by Charisius (mainly a compilation of Thrax, as well as lost texts by Remmius Palaemon and others) and Diomedes (focusing more on prosody) were popular in Rome as pedagogic material for teaching Greek to native Latin-speakers.

One of the most prominent scholars of Alexandria and of the antiquity was Apollonius Dyscolus. Apollonius wrote more than thirty treatises on questions of syntax, semantics, morphology, prosody, orthography, dialectology, and more. Happily, four of these are preserved—we still have a Syntax in four books, and three one-book monographs on pronouns, adverbs, and connectives, respectively.

Lexicography become an important domain of study as many grammarians compiled dictionaries, thesauri and lists of special words "λέξεις" that were old, or dialectical or special (such as medical words or botanic words) at that period. In the early medieval times we find more categories of dictionaries like the dictionary of Suida (considered the first encyclopedic dictionary), etymological dictionaries etc.

At that period, the Greek language functioned as a lingua franca, a language spoken throughout the known world (for the Greeks and Romans) of that time and, as a result, modern linguistics struggles to overcome this. With the Greeks a tradition commenced in the study of language. The terminology invented by Greek and Latin grammarians in the ancient world and medieval period continue as a part of our everyday language. Think, for example, of notions such as the word, the syllable, the verb, the subject etc.

=== Rome ===
In the 4th century, Aelius Donatus compiled the Latin grammar Ars Grammatica that was to be the defining school text through the Middle Ages. A smaller version, Ars Minor, covered only the eight parts of speech; eventually when books came to be printed in the 15th century, this was one of the first books to be printed. Schoolboys subjected to all this education gave us the current meaning of "grammar" (attested in English since 1176).

=== China ===
Similar to the Indian tradition, Chinese philology (小學; xiǎoxué; 'elementary studies') emerged as an aid to understanding the Chinese classics c. the 3rd century BCE, during the Western Han dynasty. Philology came to be divided into three branches: exegesis (訓詁; xùngǔ), grammatology (文字; wénzì) and phonology (音韻; yīnyùn). The field reached its golden age in the 17th century, during the Qing dynasty. The Erya (c. 3rd century BCE), comparable to the Indian Nighantu, is regarded as the first linguistic work in China. Shuowen Jiezi (c. 100 CE), the first Chinese dictionary, classifies Chinese characters by radicals, a practice that would be followed by most subsequent lexicographers. Two more pioneering works produced during the Han dynasty are Fangyan, the first Chinese work concerning dialects, and Shiming, devoted to etymology.

As in ancient Greece, early Chinese thinkers were concerned with the relationship between names and reality. Confucius (c. 551 – c. 479 BCE) famously emphasized the moral commitment implicit in a name, (zhengming) stating that the moral collapse of the pre-Qin was a result of the failure to rectify behaviour to meet the moral commitment inherent in names: "Good government consists in the ruler being a ruler, the minister being a minister, the father being a father, and the son being a son... If names be not correct, language is not in accordance with the truth of things." (Analects 12.11, 13.3).

However, what is the reality implied by a name? The later Mohists or the group known as School of Names, consider that a name (名; míng may refer to three kinds of actuality (實; shí): type universals (horse), individual (John), and unrestricted (thing). They adopt a realist position on the name-reality connection – universals arise because "the world itself fixes the patterns of similarity and difference by which things should be divided into kinds". The philosophical tradition features a well known conundrum "a white horse is not a horse" by Gongsun Longzi (4th century BCE), which resembles those of the sophists; Gongsun questions if in copula statements (X is Y), are X and Y identical or is X a subclass of Y.

Xunzi (c. 310 – c. after 238 BCE) revisits the principle of zhengming, but instead of rectifying behaviour to suit the names, his emphasis is on rectifying language to correctly reflect reality. This is consistent with a more "conventional" view of word origins.

The study of phonology in China began late, and was influenced by the Indian tradition, after Buddhism had become popular in China. The rime dictionary is a type of dictionary arranged by tone and rime, in which the pronunciations of characters are indicated by fanqie spellings. Rime tables were later produced to aid the understanding of fanqie.

Philological studies flourished during the Qing dynasty, with Duan Yucai and Wang Niansun as the towering figures. The last great philologist of the era was Zhang Binglin, who also helped lay the foundation of modern Chinese linguistics. The Western comparative method was brought into China by Bernard Karlgren, the first scholar to reconstruct Middle Chinese and Old Chinese with Latin alphabet (not IPA). Important modern Chinese linguists include Yuen Ren Chao, Luo Changpei, Li Fanggui and Wang Li.

Ancient commentators on the classics focused their attention on lexical content and the function of linking words rather than syntax; the first modern Chinese grammar was produced by Ma Jianzhong (late 19th century), based on a Western model.

== Middle Ages ==
=== Arabic grammar ===
Owing to the rapid expansion of Islam in the 8th century, many people learned Arabic as a lingua franca. For this reason, the earliest grammatical treatises on Arabic are often written by non-native speakers.

The earliest grammarian who is known to us is ʿAbd Allāh ibn Abī Isḥāq al-Ḥaḍramī (died 735-736 CE, 117 AH). The efforts of three generations of grammarians culminated in the book of the Persian linguist Sibāwayhi (c. 760–793).

Sibawayh made a detailed and professional description of Arabic in 760 in his monumental work, Al-kitab fi al-nahw (الكتاب في النحو, The Book on Grammar). In his book he distinguished phonetics from phonology.

=== European vernaculars ===
The Irish Sanas Cormaic 'Cormac's Glossary' (10th century) is Europe's first etymological and encyclopedic dictionary in any non-Classical language. The Auraicept na n-Éces, compiled over the course of several centuries — possibly starting as early as in the 8th century — is a treatise on that same language and the first instance of a philosophical defence of a spoken European vernacular over Latin.

A milestone in the early history of Germanic linguistics, the First Grammatical Treatise (12th century) offers a wealth of information on Old Norse lexicon, grammar and phonology.

In the 13th century, the Modistae or "speculative grammarians" introduced the notion of universal grammar. In the treatise De vulgari eloquentia ("On the Eloquence of Vernacular"), dating to 1303-1305, the Italian poet Dante presented a theory of language and discussed the origin of languages after the confusion of tongues following the events of the Tower of Babel. By recognizing the instrinsically human nature of language, Dante first recognized that — like customs and traditions — languages are bound to evolve over time and to differentiate in space giving birth to dialects. He argued that the wave of human populations migrating westward to Europe after the confusion of tongues were already differentiated into three linguistic families: the Greek family, one that can be defined as Slavo-Germanic, and the one that is today known as Romance family. Each of these families independently underwent differentiation into several branching languages. The Romance family, in particular, appeared to Dante as split into three closely related languages, namely Old French ("langue d'oïl"), Old Occitan ("langue d'oc") and Italian ("lingua del sì"). The writer then focused on the additional subdivision of Italian into 14 dialectal varieties, whence it could be possible to extract a noble and elevated vulgar language not inferior in dignity to Latin.

The Renaissance and Baroque period saw an intensified interest in linguistics, notably for the purpose of Bible translations by the Jesuits, and also related to philosophical speculation on philosophical languages and the origin of language.

In the 1600s, Joannes Goropius Becanus was the oldest representative of Dutch linguistics. He was the first person to publish a fragment of Gothic, mainly The Lord's Prayer. Franciscus Juniuns, Lambert ten Kate from Amsterdam and George Hickes from England are considered to be the founding fathers of Germanic linguistics.

== Modern linguistics ==
Modern linguistics did not begin until the late 18th century, and the Romantic or animist theses of Johann Gottfried Herder and Johann Christoph Adelung remained influential well into the 19th century.

In the history of American linguistics, there were hundreds of Indigenous languages that were never recorded. Many of the languages were spoken, not written, and so they are now inaccessible. Under these circumstances, linguists such as Franz Boas tried to prescribe sound methodical principles for the analysis of unfamiliar languages. Boas was an influential linguist and was followed by Edward Sapir and Leonard Bloomfield.

=== Historical linguistics ===
During the 18th century conjectural history, based on a mix of linguistics and anthropology, on the topic of both the origin and progress of language and society was fashionable. These thinkers contributed to the construction of academic paradigms in which some languages were labelled "primitive" relative to the English language. Hugh Blair wrote that for Native Americans, certain motions and actions were found to convey meaning as much as what was said verbally. Around the same time, James Burnett authored a 6 volume treatise that delved more deeply into the matter of "savage languages". Other writers theorized that Native American languages were "nothing but the natural and instinctive cries of the animal" without grammatical structure. The thinkers within this paradigm connected themselves with the Greeks and Romans, viewed as the only civilized persons of the ancient world, a view articulated by Thomas Sheridan who compiled an important 18th century pronunciation dictionary: "It was to the care taken in the cultivation of their languages, that Greece and Rome, owed that splendor, which eclipsed all the other nations of the world".

In the 18th century James Burnett, Lord Monboddo analyzed numerous languages and deduced logical elements of the evolution of human languages. His thinking was interleaved with his precursive concepts of biological evolution. Some of his early concepts have been validated and are considered correct today. In his The Sanscrit Language (1786), Sir William Jones proposed that Sanskrit and Persian had resemblances to Classical Greek, Latin, Gothic, and Celtic languages. From this idea sprung the field of comparative linguistics and historical linguistics. Through the 19th century, European linguistics centered on the comparative history of the Indo-European languages, with a concern for finding their common roots and tracing their development.

In the 1820s, Wilhelm von Humboldt observed that human language was a rule-governed system, anticipating a theme that was to become central in the formal work on syntax and semantics of language in the 20th century. Of this observation he said that it allowed language to make "infinite use of finite means" (Über den Dualis, 1827). Humboldt's work is associated with the movement of Romantic linguistics, which was inspired by Naturphilosophie and Romantic science. Other notable representatives of the movement include Friedrich Schlegel and Franz Bopp.

It was only in the late 19th century that the Neogrammarian approach of Karl Brugmann and others introduced a rigid notion of sound law.

Historical linguistics also led to the emergence of the semantics and some forms of pragmatics (Nerlich, 1992; Nerlich and Clarke, 1996).

Historical linguistics continues today and linguistics have succeeded in grouping approximately 5000 languages of the world into a number of common ancestors.

=== Structuralism ===
In Europe there was a development of structural linguistics, initiated by Ferdinand de Saussure, a Swiss professor of Indo-European and general linguistics, whose lectures on general linguistics, published posthumously by his students, set the direction of European linguistic analysis from the 1920s on; his approach has been widely adopted in other fields under the broad term "Structuralism".

By the 20th century, the attention shifted from language change to the structure, which is governed by rules and principles. This structure turned more into grammar and by the 1920s structural linguistic, was developing into sophisticated methods of grammatical analysis.

=== Descriptive linguistics ===
During the second World War, North American linguists Leonard Bloomfield, William Mandeville Austin and several of his students and colleagues developed teaching materials for a variety of languages whose knowledge was needed for the war effort. This work led to an increasing prominence of the field of linguistics, which became a recognized discipline in most American universities only after the war.

In 1965, William Stokoe, Carl G. Croneberg, and Dorothy C. Casterline linguists from Gallaudet University published an analysis which proved that American Sign Language fits the criteria for a natural language.

=== Generative linguistics ===
Generative linguistics focuses on modeling the subconscious rules governing language. It started with Noam Chomsky’s Transformational Grammar and has evolved into various theories like Government and Binding and the Minimalist Program. Core principles include the distinction between competence and performance, the role of innate grammar (Universal Grammar), and the use of explicit, formal models to describe linguistic knowledge.

=== Other subfields ===
From roughly 1980 onwards, pragmatic, functional, and cognitive approaches have steadily gained ground, both in the United States and in Europe.

== See also ==
- History of grammar
- History of communication
- History of women in linguistics
