= Etymology =

Study of the origin and evolution of words

Etymology (/ˌɛtɪˈmɒlədʒi/ ET-ih-MOL-ə-jee) is the study of the origin and evolution of words—including their constituent units of sound and meaning—across time. In the 21st century, as a subfield within linguistics, etymology has become an increasingly rigorous scientific field of study. It is most directly tied to historical linguistics, philology, and semiotics, and additionally draws upon comparative semantics, morphology, pragmatics, and phonetics in order to construct a comprehensive and chronological catalogue of all meanings that a word (and its related parts) has carried throughout its history. The origin of any particular word is also known as its etymology.

For languages with a long written history, etymologists make use of texts, particularly texts about the language itself, to gather knowledge about how words were used during earlier periods, how they developed in meaning and form, or when and how they entered the language. Etymologists also apply the methods of comparative linguistics to reconstruct information about forms that are too old for any direct information to be available. By analyzing related languages with a technique known as the comparative method, linguists can make inferences about their shared parent language and its vocabulary. In this way, word roots in many European languages, for example, can be traced back to the origin of the Indo-European language family.

Even though etymological research originated from the philological tradition, much current etymological research is done on language families where little or no early documentation is available, such as Uralic and Austronesian.

== Etymology ==
The word etymology is derived from the Ancient Greek word ἐτυμολογία (etymologíā), itself from ἔτυμον (étymon), meaning 'true sense or sense of a truth', and the suffix -logia, denoting 'the study or logic of'.

The etymon is the predicate (i.e., stem or root) from which a later word or morpheme derives. For example, the Latin word candidus, which means 'white', is the etymon of English candid. Relationships are often less transparent, however. English place names such as Winchester, Gloucester, Tadcaster share different forms of a suffix that originated as the Latin castrum 'fort'.

Reflex is the name given to a descendant word in a daughter language, descended from an earlier language. For example, Modern English heat is the reflex of the Old English hǣtu. Rarely, this word is used in reverse, and the reflex is actually the root word rather than the descendant word. However, this usage is usually filled by the term etymon instead. A reflex will sometimes be described simply as a descendant, derivative or derived from an etymon (but see below).

Cognates or lexical cognates are sets of words that have been inherited in direct descent from an etymological ancestor in a common parent language. Doublets or etymological twins or twinlings (or possibly triplets, and so forth) are specifically cognates within the same language. Although they have the same etymological root, they tend to have different phonological forms, and to have entered the language through different routes.

A root is the source of related words within a single language (no language barrier is crossed). Similar to the distinction between etymon and root, a nuanced distinction can sometimes be made between a descendant and a derivative.

A derivative is one of the words which have their source in a root word, and were at some time created from the root word using morphological constructs such as suffixes, prefixes, and slight changes to the vowels or to the consonants of the root word. For example: unhappy, happily, and unhappily are all derivatives of the root word happy. The terms root and derivative are used in the analysis of morphological derivation within a language in studies that are not concerned with historical linguistics and that do not cross the language barrier.

== Methods ==
Graphical representation of the relationships between etymologically-related words. 'Etymon' is used in linguistic jargon, while 'root' is the more common colloquial term.

Etymologists apply a number of methods to study the origins of words, some of which are:

- Philological research. Changes in the form and meaning of the word can be traced with the aid of older texts, if such are available.
- Making use of dialectological data. The form or meaning of the word might show variations between dialects, which may yield clues about its earlier history.
- The comparative method. By a systematic comparison of related languages, etymologists may often be able to detect which words derive from their common ancestor language and which were instead later borrowed from another language.
- The study of semantic change. Etymologists must often make hypotheses about changes in the meaning of particular words. Such hypotheses are tested against the general knowledge of semantic shifts. For example, the assumption of a particular change of meaning may be substantiated by showing that the same type of change has occurred in other languages as well.

== Types of word origins ==
Etymological theory recognizes that words originate through a limited number of basic mechanisms, the most important of which are language change, borrowing (i.e., the adoption of loanwords from other languages); word formation such as derivation and compounding; and onomatopoeia and sound symbolism (i.e., the creation of imitative words such as click or grunt).

While the origin of newly emerged words is often more or less transparent, it tends to become obscured through time due to sound change or semantic change. Due to sound change, it is not readily obvious that the English word set is related to the word sit (the former is originally a causative formation of the latter). It is even less obvious that bless is related to blood (the former was originally a derivative term meaning 'to mark with blood').

Semantic change may also occur. For example, the English word bead originally meant 'prayer', and acquired its modern meaning through the practice of counting the recitation of prayers by using small objects strung together (beads). One type of semantic change involves the quotidianisation of metaphor. Thus the word "trauma", the predecessors of which apparently referenced an "open hole" in the body, has passed through some metaphorical stage or stages and now often refers to some sort of psychological wound.

== History ==
The search for meaningful origins for familiar or strange words is far older than the modern understanding of linguistic evolution and the relationships of languages, which began no earlier than the 18th century. Etymology has been a form of witty wordplay, in which the supposed origins of words were creatively imagined to satisfy contemporary requirements. For example, the Greek poet Pindar (born c. 522 BCE) employed inventive etymologies to flatter his patrons. Plutarch employed etymologies insecurely based on fancied resemblances in sounds. Isidore of Seville's Etymologiae was an encyclopedic tracing of "first things" that remained uncritically in use in Europe until the sixteenth century. Etymologicum Genuinum is a grammatical encyclopedia edited at Constantinople during the 9th century, one of several similar Byzantine works. The 13th-century Golden Legend, as written by Jacobus de Voragine, begins each hagiography of a saint with a fanciful excursus in the form of an etymology.

=== Sanskrit ===
In ancient India, Sanskrit linguists and grammarians were the first to undertake comprehensive analyses of linguistics and etymology. The study of Sanskrit etymology has provided Western scholars with the basis of historical linguistics and modern etymology. Four of the most famous Sanskrit linguists are:

- Yāska (c. 6th–5th centuries BCE)
- Pāṇini (c. 520–460 BCE)
- Kātyāyana (6th-4th centuries BCE)
- Patanjali (2nd century BCE)

These were not the earliest Sanskrit grammarians, but rather followed an earlier line of scholars who lived several centuries earlier, who included Śākaṭāyana (814–760 BCE), and of whom very little is known. The earliest of attested etymologies can be found in the Vedas, in the philosophical explanations of the Brahmanas, Aranyakas, and Upanishads.

The analyses of Sanskrit grammar done by the previously mentioned linguists involved extensive studies on the etymology (called Nirukta or Vyutpatti in Sanskrit) of Sanskrit words, because the ancient Indians considered sound and speech itself to be sacred and, for them, the words of the Vedas contained deep encoding of the mysteries of the soul and God.

=== Greco-Roman ===
One of the earliest philosophical texts of the Classical Greek period to address etymology was the Socratic dialogue Cratylus (c. 360 BCE) by Plato. During much of the dialogue, Socrates makes guesses as to the origins of many words, including the names of the gods. In his odes, Pindar spins complimentary etymologies to flatter his patrons. Plutarch (Life of Numa Pompilius) spins an etymology for pontifex,:

The priests, called Pontifices.... have the name of Pontifices from potens, powerful because they attend the service of the gods, who have power and command overall. Others make the word refer to exceptions of impossible cases; the priests were to perform all the duties possible; if anything lays beyond their power, the exception was not to be cavilled. The most common opinion is the most absurd, which derives this word from pons, and assigns the priests the title of bridge-makers. The sacrifices performed on the bridge were amongst the most sacred and ancient, and the keeping and repairing of the bridge attached, like any other public sacred office, to the priesthood.

=== Medieval ===
Isidore of Seville compiled a volume of etymologies to illuminate the triumph of religion. Each saint's legend in Jacobus de Voragine's Golden Legend begins with an etymological discourse on their name:

Lucy is said of light, and light is beauty in beholding, after that S. Ambrose saith: The nature of light is such, she is gracious in beholding, she spreadeth over all without lying down, she passeth in going right without crooking by right long line; and it is without dilation of tarrying, and therefore it is showed the blessed Lucy hath beauty of virginity without any corruption; essence of charity without disordinate love; rightful going and devotion to God, without squaring out of the way; right long line by continual work without negligence of slothful tarrying. In Lucy is said, the way of light.

=== Islamic Golden Age ===
During the Islamic Golden Age between the 8th and 14th centuries, several scholars laid the foundations of systematic etymology in Arabic. In the 8th century, al‑Khalīl ibn Aḥmad al‑Farāhīdī compiled the first Arabic dictionary, Kitab al-'Ayn (Arabic: كتاب العين "The Source"), in which he organized entries by root and phonetic properties rather than alphabetic order, and provided etymological commentaries tracing word meanings to their triliteral origins.

Ibn Fāris was the first to apply the method of isytiqq (derivation analysis) in his Maqāyīs al-Lughah, tracing multi‑letter words back to their root forms.

=== Modern era ===
Etymology in the modern sense emerged in the late 18th-century European academia, in the context of the Age of Enlightenment, although preceded by 17th-century pioneers such as Marcus Zuerius van Boxhorn, Gerardus Vossius, Stephen Skinner, Elisha Coles, and William Wotton. The first known systematic attempt to prove the relationship between two languages on the basis of similarity of grammar and lexicon was made in 1770 by the Hungarian, János Sajnovics, when he attempted to demonstrate the relationship between Sami and Hungarian.

The origin of modern historical linguistics is often traced to William Jones, a Welsh philologist living in India, who in 1782 observed the genetic relationship between Greek and Latin. Jones published his The Sanscrit Language in 1786, laying the foundation for the field of Indo-European studies. However, as early as 1727, a Jesuit missionary in India, père Gargam, theorized that Sanskrit could be a "mother tongue arrived from another country" for Telugu and Kannada because they contained many of the same Sanskrit terms; and in a letter to Abbé Barthélemy of the Académie des Inscriptions et Belles Lettres in 1767, another Jesuit missionary in India, père Gaston-Laurent Coeurdoux, posed the question of the origin of the Sanskrit language and systematically argued his hypothesis of a "commune origine" of Sanskrit, Latin, and Greek, even putting Sanskrit terms and their Latin equivalents in columns. Although they sent many Sanskrit-related texts to the Bibliothèque du roi, such as literary translations, grammars, dictionaries, and other works, the Jesuit Missionaries in the Carnatic Region between 1695–1762, including Jean Calmette, Coeurdoux, Gargam, Jean François Pons, and others, have only recently begun receiving more attention in modern scholarship for their early contributions to fields like Indo-European Studies, historical linguistics, and comparative philology.

The study of etymology in Germanic philology was introduced by Rasmus Rask in the early 19th century and elevated to a high standard with the Deutsches Wörterbuch (German Dictionary) compiled by the Brothers Grimm. The successes of the comparative approach culminated in the Neogrammarian school of the late 19th century. Still, Friedrich Nietzsche used etymological strategies (principally and most famously in On the Genealogy of Morality, but also elsewhere) to argue that moral values have definite historical origins, where the meaning of concepts such as good and evil are shown to have changed over time according to the value-system that appropriates them. This strategy gained popularity in the 20th century, and philosophers, such as Jacques Derrida, have used etymologies to indicate former meanings of words to de-center the "violent hierarchies" of Western philosophy.

== Notable etymologists ==
- Ernest Klein (1899–1983), Hungarian-born Romanian-Canadian linguist, etymologist
- Marko Snoj (born 1959), Indo-Europeanist, Slavist, Albanologist, lexicographer, and etymologist
- Anatoly Liberman (born 1937), linguist, medievalist, etymologist, poet, translator of poetry and literary critic
- Michael Quinion (born c. 1942)

== See also ==
- Etymological dictionary
- Lists of etymologies
- Bongo-Bongo – Name for an imaginary language in linguistics
- Etymological fallacy – Fallacy in which a word's history defines its meaning
- False cognate – Words that look or sound alike, but are not related
- False etymology – Popular, but false belief about word origins
- Folk etymology – Process of reinterpretive word formation
- Malapropism – Misuse of a word
- Pseudoscientific language comparison – Form of pseudo-scholarship
- Onomastics – Study of proper names
- Wörter und Sachen – Philological movement in Germany and Austria
- Suppletion – Word having inflected forms from multiple unrelated stems

== Bibliography ==
- Alfred Bammesberger. English Etymology. Heidelberg: Carl Winter, 1984.
- Philip Durkin. "Etymology", in Encyclopedia of Language and Linguistics, 2nd edn. Ed. Keith Brown. Vol. 4. Oxford: Elsevier, 2006, pp. 260–267.
- Philip Durkin. The Oxford Guide to Etymology. Oxford University Press, 2009.
- William B. Lockwood. An Informal Introduction to English Etymology. Montreux, London: Minerva, 1995.
- Robert Mailhammer, ed. Lexical and Structural Etymology: Beyond Word Histories. Boston/Berlin: de Gruyter Mouton, 2013.
- Yakov Malkiel. Etymology. Cambridge University Press, 1993.
- Alan S. C. Ross. Etymology, with a special reference to English. Fair Lawn, NJ: Essential Books; London: Deutsch, 1958.
- Michael Samuels. Linguistic Evolution: With Special Reference to English. Cambridge University Press, 1972.
- Bo Svensén. "Etymology", chap. 19 of A Handbook of Lexicography: The Theory and Practice of Dictionary-Making. Cambridge University Press, 2009.
- Walther von Wartburg. Problems and Methods in Linguistics, rev. edn. with the collaboration of Stephen Ullmann. Trans. Joyce M. H. Reid. Oxford: Blackwell, 1969.
