= Philip Durkin =

Lexicographer and etymologist

- Education: University of Oxford
- Known for: Deputy Chief Editor of the Oxford English Dictionary
- Scientific career
- Fields: Lexicography; etymology; historical linguistics
- Workplaces: Oxford University Press; University of Glasgow

Philip N. R. Durkin is a lexicographer and etymologist, Deputy Chief Editor of the Oxford English Dictionary and leader of its team of specialist etymology editors. His books include The Oxford Guide to Etymology (2009) and Borrowed Words: A History of Loanwords in English (2014), and he is the editor of The Oxford Handbook of Lexicography (2015).

== Education ==
Durkin earned a doctorate from the University of Oxford in 1994 with a thesis on late Middle English prose texts.

== Career ==
Durkin has worked on the OED since the late 1990s and leads its etymology and form-history work. He has also held an honorary research post in the School of Critical Studies at the University of Glasgow.

== Selected works ==
=== Books ===
- Durkin, Philip (2009). The Oxford Guide to Etymology. Oxford: Oxford University Press. ISBN 978-0-19-969161-6.
- Durkin, Philip (2014). Borrowed Words: A History of Loanwords in English. Oxford: Oxford University Press. ISBN 978-0-19-957499-5.
- Durkin, Philip, ed. (2015). The Oxford Handbook of Lexicography. Oxford: Oxford University Press. ISBN 978-0-19-969163-0.
- Harvey, Anthony; Durkin, Philip (2018). Spoken Through: How Scholarly Dictionaries Mediate the Past. H. M. Chadwick Memorial Lectures 28. Cambridge: Cambridge University Press, University of Cambridge Department of Anglo-Saxon, Norse and Celtic. ISBN 978-1-909106-18-5.

=== Articles ===
- Durkin, Philip N. R. (May 1999). "Root and Branch: Revising the etymological component of the Oxford English Dictionary". Transactions of the Philological Society. 97 (1): 1–150. doi:10.1111/1467-968X.00044.
