= Nighantu =

Nighaṇṭu (Sanskrit: निघण्टु, IPA: [nɪɡʱɐɳʈʊ]) is a Sanskrit term for a traditional collection of words, grouped into thematic categories, often with brief annotations. Such collections share characteristics with glossaries and thesauri, but are not true lexicons, such as the kośa of Sanskrit literature. Particular collections are also called nighaṇṭava.

While a number of nighantavas devoted to specialized subjects exist, the eponymous Nighantu of the genre is an ancient collection, handed down from Vedic times. It was the subject of the Nirukta, a commentary, together with a treatise on etymology, by Yaska. Technically, Yaska's Nirukta should designate his commentary only, but traditionally the Nighantu has been understood to be included in it.

== The Traditional Nighantu ==
According to Yaska (Nirukta 1.20), the Nighantu was a collection of rare or difficult words gathered by earlier sages for easier understanding of Vedic texts that perhaps they may not have fully understood themselves. The collection comprises five adhyāyas or chapters, in three kāṇḍas or books:

- naighaṇṭuka kāṇḍa: three adhyāyas of similes, synonyms, metonyms and other glosses. The first adhyāya deals mainly with physical things and objects of nature. The second adhyāya deals mainly with man, his physical being, and qualities associated with his being, such as property and emotional states. The third adhyāya deals mainly with abstract qualities and concepts.
- naigama kāṇḍa: one adhyāya of homonyms (aikapadikam) and particularly difficult or ambiguous words.
- daivata kāṇḍa: one adhyāya of epithets of divine beings.

Yaska's Nirukta covers the Naighantuka somewhat synoptically, often merely echoing a given gloss, but deals with the 278 words of the Naigama and the 151 names of the Daivata in detail. A full word-by-word commentary on the Naighantuka was written by Devarajayajvan, some time before the 14th CE.

A critical edition of the Nighantu and the Nirukta was published in the 1920s by Lakshman Sarup. In it, two major recensions were identified, one longer than the other, indicating additions at untraceable yet relatively early dates. It is now customary to render both recensions together, with the additions of the longer recension in parentheses.
