= Yāska =

Indian linguist (7th–5th century BCE)

- Born: 7th–5th century BCE

Academic work
- Era: Late Vedic period
- Main interests: Sanskrit grammarian
- Notable works: Nirukta, Nighantu
- Notable ideas: Grammar, Linguistics, Etymology

Yāska (7th–5th century BCE) was an ancient Indian grammarian and Vedic linguist. Preceding Pāṇini (7th–4th century BCE), he is traditionally identified as the author of Nirukta, the discipline of "etymology" (explanation of words) within the Sanskrit grammatical tradition, and the Nighantu, the oldest proto-thesaurus in India. Nirukta is one of the six Vedāṅgas (limbs of the Veda) in Hinduism. Yaska is widely regarded as the precursive founder of the discipline of what would become etymology in both the East and the West.

== Dating ==
Pāṇini cites at least ten grammarians and linguists before him. According to Sumitra Mangesh Katre, the ten Vedic scholar names he quotes are of Apisali, Kashyapa, Gargya, Galava, Cakravarmana, Bharadvaja, Sakatayana, Sakalya, Senaka and Sphotayana.

Determining the exact century of Yaska is difficult, and opinions of different scholars vary from 7th–5th century BC.

== Contribution ==
Yaska is the author of the Nirukta, a technical treatise on etymology, lexical category and the semantics of Sanskrit words. He is thought to have succeeded Śākaṭāyana, an old grammarian and expositor of the Vedas, who is mentioned in his text.

The Nirukta attempts to explain how certain words get to have their meanings, especially in the context of interpreting the Vedic texts. It includes a system of rules for forming words from roots and affixes, and a glossary of irregular words, and formed the basis for later lexicons and dictionaries. It consists of three parts, viz.: (i) Naighantuka, a collection of synonyms; (ii) Naigama, a collection of words peculiar to the Vedas, and (iii) Daivata, words relating to deities and sacrifices.

Nirukta, or etymology was one of the six vedangas or compulsory subjects in the syllabus of Vedic scholarship in ancient India.

== Lexical categories and parts of speech ==
Yāska defined four main categories of words:

1. nāma – nouns or substantives
2. ākhyāta – verbs
3. upasarga – pre-verbs or prefixes
4. nipāta – particles, invariant words (perhaps prepositions)

Yāska singled out two main ontological categories: a process or an action (bhāva), and an entity or a being or a thing (sattva). Then he first defined the verb as that in which the bhāva ('process') is predominant whereas a noun is that in which the sattva ('thing') is predominant. The 'process' is one that has, according to one interpretation, an early stage and a later stage and when such a 'process' is the dominant sense, a finite verb is used as in vrajati, 'walks', or pacati, 'cooks'.

But this characterisation of noun / verb is inadequate, as some processes may also have nominal forms. For e.g., He went for a walk. Hence, Yāska proposed that when a process is referred to as a 'petrified' or 'configured' mass (mūrta) extending from start to finish, a verbal noun should be used, e.g. vrajyā, a walk, or pakti, a cooking. The latter may be viewed as a case of summary scanning, since the element of sequence in the process is lacking.

These concepts are related to modern notions of grammatical aspect, the mūrta constituting the perfective and the bhāva the imperfective aspect.

Yāska also gives a test for nouns both concrete and abstract: nouns are words which can be indicated by the pronoun that.

=== Words as carriers of meaning: atomism vs. holism debate ===
As in modern semantic theory, Yāska views words as the main carriers of meaning. This view – that words have a primary or preferred ontological status in defining meaning, was fiercely debated in the Indian tradition over many centuries. The two sides of the debate may be called the Nairuktas (based on Yāska's Nirukta, atomists), vs the Vaiyākarans (grammarians following Pāṇini, holists), and the debate continued in various forms for twelve centuries involving different philosophers from the Nyaya, Mimamsa and Buddhist schools.

In the prātishākhya texts that precede Yāska, and possibly Sakatayana as well, the gist of the controversy was stated cryptically in sutra form as "saṃhitā pada-prakṛtiḥ". According to the atomist view, the words would be the primary elements (prakṛti) out of which the sentence is constructed, while the holistic view considers the sentence as the primary entity, originally given in its context of utterance, and the words are arrived at only through analysis and abstraction.

This debate relates to the atomistic vs holistic interpretation of linguistic fragments – a very similar debate is raging today between traditional semantics and cognitive linguistics, over the view whether words in themselves have semantic interpretations that can be composed to form larger strings. The cognitive linguistics view of semantics is that any definition of a word ultimately constrains its meanings because the actual meaning of a word can only be construed by considering a large number of individual contextual cues.

=== Etymologically, nouns originate from verbs ===
Yāska also defends the view, presented first in the lost text of Sakatayana that etymologically, most nouns have their origins in verbs. An example in English may be the noun origin, derived from the Latin originalis, which is ultimately based on the verb oriri, "to rise". This view is related to the position that in defining agent categories, behaviours are ontologically primary to, say, appearance. This was also a source for considerable debate for several centuries (see Sakatayana for details).

== Sources ==
- Chatterjee, Manas (2020), "The evolution of the Yajurvedic words in Yaska's view" (PDF), International Journal of Sanskrit Research.
- Harold G. Coward (1990). The Philosophy of the Grammarians, in Encyclopedia of Indian Philosophies Volume 5 (Editor: Karl Potter). Princeton University Press. ISBN 978-81-208-0426-5.
- Bod, Rens (2013), A New History of the Humanities: The Search for Principles and Patterns from Antiquity to the Present, Oxford University Press, ISBN 978-0-19-966521-1
- Bronkhorst, Johannes (2016), How the Brahmins Won: From Alexander to the Guptas, BRILL
- Cardona, George (1997) [1976], Pāṇini: A Survey of Research, Motilal Banarsidass, ISBN 978-81-208-1494-3
- Kahrs, Eivind. On the Study of Yāska's Nirukta. Bhandarkar Oriental Research Institute, Pune, India, 2005. LCCN 2006310275. OCLC 64771339.
- Langacker, Ronald W. Grammar and Conceptualization. Mouton de Gruyer, 1999. ISBN 978-3-11-016604-0.
- Lidova, Natalia (1994), Drama and Ritual of Early Hinduism, Motilal Banarsidass, ISBN 978-81-208-1234-5
- Lochtfeld, James G. (2002a), The Illustrated Encyclopedia of Hinduism: A-M, The Rosen Publishing Group, ISBN 978-0-8239-3179-8
- Matilal, Bimal Krishna. The word and the world: India's contribution to the study of language. Oxford, 1990. ISBN 978-0-19-562515-8.
- Misra, Kamal K. (2000), Textbook of Anthropological Linguistics, Concept Publishing Company
- Rajavade, V.K. Yāska's Nirukta. Government Oriental Series Class A, no.7. Bhandarkar Oriental Research Institute, Pune, India, 1993. OCLC 30703024.
- Scharfe, Hartmut (1977), Grammatical Literature, Otto Harrassowitz Verlag, ISBN 978-3-447-01706-0
- Sharma, T.R.S. Chief editor. Ancient Indian Literature, An Anthology. Volume 1, Sahitya Akademi, New Delhi, 2000. ISBN 978-81-260-0794-3.
- Staal, Frits (1965), "Euclid and Pāṇini", Philosophy East and West, 15 (2): 99–116, doi:10.2307/1397332, JSTOR 1397332
- Staal, Frits (1996), Ritual and Mantras: Rules Without Meaning, Motilal Banarsidass, ISBN 978-8120814127
- Vergiani, Vincenzo (2017), "Bhartrhari on Language, Perception, and Consciousness", in Ganeri, Jonardon (ed.), The Oxford Handbook of Indian Philosophy, Oxford University Press
- Witzel, Michael (2009), "Moving Targets? Texts, language, archaeology and history in the Late Vedic and early Buddhist periods", Indo-Iranian Journal, 52 (2–3): 287–310, doi:10.1163/001972409X12562030836859
