= Śākaṭāyana =

Sanskrit grammarian (814–760 BCE)

Personal life
- Born: 814 BCE
- Died: 760 BCE
- Main interest: Sanskrit grammar

Religious life
- Religion: Hinduism

Shakatayana (Śākaṭāyana; 814–760 BCE) was a Sanskrit grammarian, linguist, and Vedic scholar. He is known for his theory that all nouns are derived from a verbal root which contrasted to grammarian Pāṇini. He also posited that prepositions only have a meaning when attached to nouns or other words. His theories are presented in his work, Śākaṭāyana-śabdānuśāsana, which is not found in its entirety but referenced by other scholars such as Yāska and Pāṇini.

== Early life and background ==
Details are sparse, however, he is believed to have lived around the 7th or 8th century BCE, the same period as the grammarian Pāṇini. His identity is often confused with other scholars with the same name, however, he is known for his grammatical treatise, Śākaṭāyana-śabdānuśāsana. Given the information available, he was known as a Vedic scholar, linguist, and grammarian.

== Contributions to linguistics ==
Śākaṭāyana's most notable work is his theory that all nouns are derived from a verbal root (nirukta), a theory Pāṇini did not assert. Śākaṭāyana also proposed that functional morphemes such as prepositions do not have any meaning by themselves, but contribute to meaning only when attached to nouns or other content words. His theories are described and presented in a systematic framework in his work, Śākaṭāyana-śabdānuśāsana, and by later scholars such as Yāska. This work has not survived in its entirety, but fragments and references in later texts provide insights into his grammatical theories.

Bimal Krishna Matilal in his The word and the world refers to the debate of nirkuta vs. vyakarana as an interesting philosophical discussion between the nairuktas or etymologists and the pāṇinīyas or grammarians.

According to the etymologists, all nouns (substantives) are derived from some verbal root or the other. Yāska in his Nirukta refers to this view (in fact defends it) and ascribes it to an earlier scholar Śākaṭāyana. This would require that all words are to be analysable into atomic elements, 'roots' or 'bases' and 'affixes' or 'inflections' — better known in Sanskrit as dhātu and pratyaya [...] Yāska reported the view of Gārgya who opposed Śākaṭāyana (both preceded Pāṇini who mentions them by name) and held that not all substantival words or nouns (nāma) were to be derived from roots, for certain nominal stems were 'atomic'.

His theory was subject of debate amongst ancient Indian grammarians, like Yaska and Panini. Śākaṭāyana's emphasis on etymology and the derivation of words from roots influenced subsequent linguistic thought and shaped the way language was analyzed and understood. The acceptance and criticism to his theories demonstrate the dynamic nature of the Indian intellectual tradition; debate and discourse were encouraged and valued.

== Philosophical impact ==
Śākaṭāyana's ideas have been interpreted as aligning with the philosophical school of Mīmāṃsā, which emphasizes the eternal nature of words and their meanings. The legacy of Śākaṭāyana's thought extends beyond India, as his ideas have been studied by scholars of comparative linguistics and philosophy.

== See also ==
- Vyākaraṇa
- Pāṇini

== Sources ==
- Jaini, Padmanabh S. (1991). Gender and Salvation: Jain Debates on the Spiritual Liberation of Women. University of California Press. ISBN 978-0-520-06820-9.
- von Glasenapp, Helmuth (1999). Jainism: An Indian Religion of Salvation. Delhi: Motilal Banarsidass. ISBN 81-208-1376-6.
