= Jean François Pons =

Jean François Pons, SJ (1688–1752) was a French Jesuit who pioneered the study of Sanskrit in the West.

He published a survey of Sanskrit literature in 1743, where he described the language as "admirable for its harmony, copiousness, and energy", reporting on the parsimony of the native grammatical tradition, informing the works of de Brosses, Dow, Sinner, Voltaire, Monboddo, Halhed, Beauzée, and Hervás, and was plagiarized by John Cleland (1778).
