= Nirukta =

Study about Hindu Vedas

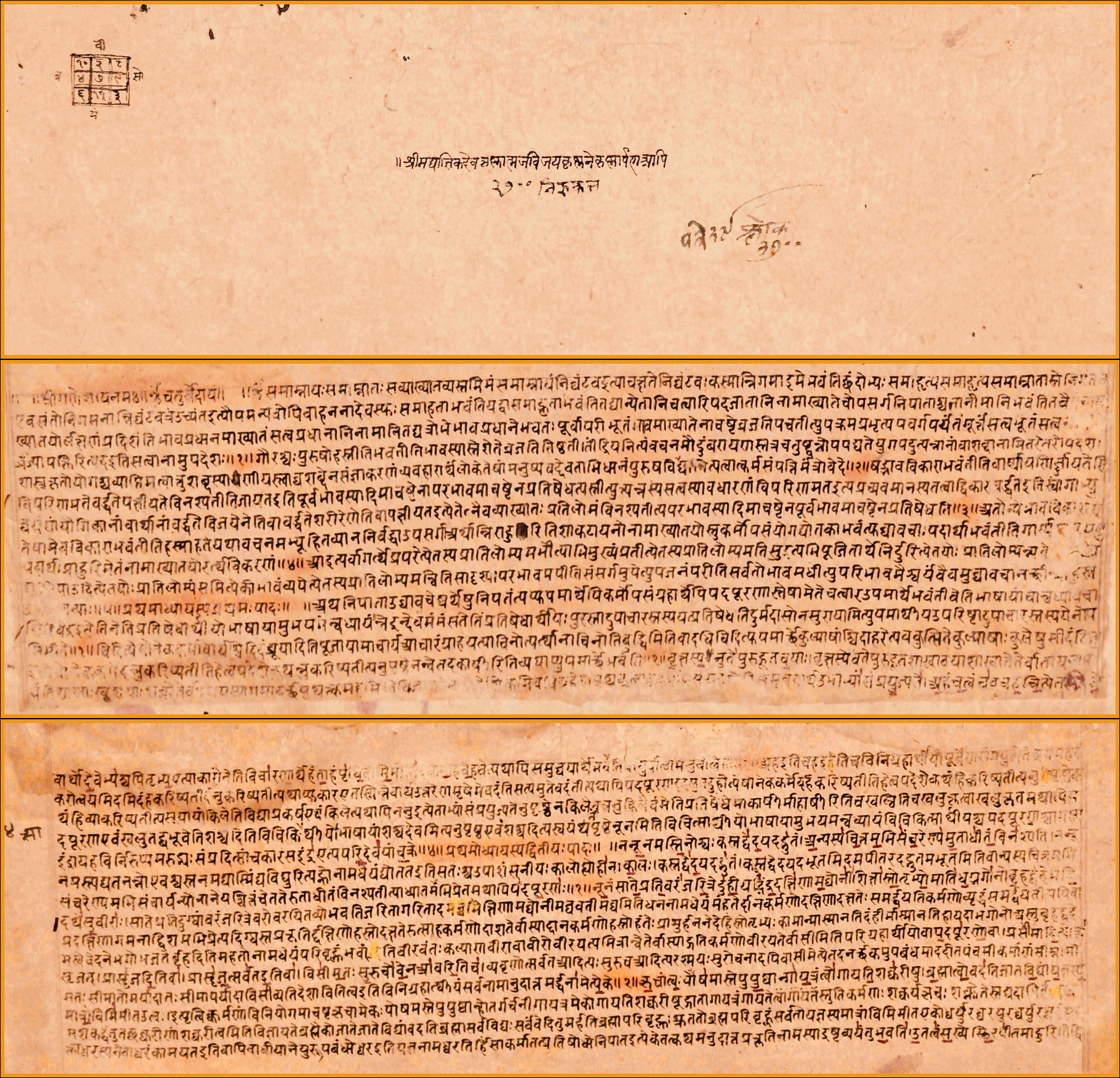
The opening pages of Yaska's Nirukta Vedanga text (Sanskrit, Devanagari script)

Nirukta (Sanskrit: निरुक्त, IPA: [n̪iɾuktɐ], "explained, interpreted") is one of the six ancient Vedangas, or ancillary science connected with the Vedas – the scriptures of Hinduism. Nirukta covers etymology, and is the study concerned with correct interpretation of Sanskrit words in the Vedas.

Nirukta is the systematic creation of a glossary and it discusses how to understand archaic, uncommon words. The field grew probably because almost a quarter of words in the Vedic texts composed in the 2nd-millennium BCE appear just once.

== Date ==
The study of Nirukta can be traced to the last centuries of the 2nd-millennium BCE Brahmanas layer of the Vedic texts. The most celebrated scholar of this field is Yāska, who wrote the Nighaṇṭu (book of glossary), the first book on this field. His text is also referred simply as Nirukta. The study of Nirukta has been closely related to the ancillary Vedic science of Vyakarana, but they have a different focus. Vyakarana deals with linguistic analysis to establish the exact form of words to properly express ideas, while Nirukta focuses on linguistic analysis to help establish the proper meaning of the words, given the context in which they are used. Yaska asserts that the prerequisite to the study of Nirukta is the study of Vyakarana.

The texts of the Nirukta field of study are also called Nirvacana shastra. A critical edition of the Nighantu and the Nirukta was published by Lakshman Sarup in the 1920s. The critical edition by Lakshman Sarup places it between 700 and 500 BCE, i.e., before Gautama Buddha.

== Etymology ==
Nirukta (Sanskrit), states Monier-Williams, means "uttered, pronounced, explained, expressed, defined, loud". It also refers to the etymological interpretation of a word, also the name of such works.

The related Sanskrit noun niruktiḥ means "poetical derivation" or "explanation of a word."

== Discussion ==
The field of Nirukta deals with ascertaining the meaning of words, particularly of archaic words no longer in use, ones created long ago and even then rarely used. The Vedic literature from the 2nd millennium BCE has a very large collection of such words, with nearly 25% of the words therein being used just once. By the 1st millennium BCE, interpreting and understanding what the Vedas meant had become a challenge, and Nirukta attempted to systematically propose theories on how words form, and then determine their meaning in order to understand the Vedas.

Yaska, the sage who likely lived around the 7th–5th century BCE, approached this problem through a semantic analysis of words, by breaking them down into their components, and then combined them in the context they were used to propose what the archaic words could have meant.

Don't memorize, seek the meaning
What has been taken [from the teacher's mouth] but not understood,
is uttered by mere [memory] recitation,
it never flares up, like dry firewood without fire.
Many a one, [although] seeing, do not see Speech,
many a one, [although] hearing, do not hear Her,
and many a one, She spreads out [Her] body, like a wife desiring her husband.
The meaning of Speech, is its fruit and flower.

— Yaska, Nirukta 1.18-1.20

A central premise of Yaska was that man creates more new words to conceptualize and describe action, that is nouns often have verbal roots. However, added Yaska, not all words have verbal roots. He asserted that both the meaning and the etymology of words are always context dependent. Words are created around object-agent, according to Yaska, to express external or internal reality perceived by man, and are one of six modifications of Kriya (action) and Bhava (dynamic being), namely being born, existing, changing, increasing, decreasing and perishing.

A sentence is a collection of words, a word is a collection of phonemes, according to Nirukta scholars of Hindu traditions. The meaning of Vedic passages has to be understood through context, purpose stated, subject matter being discussed, what is stated, how, where and when.

== Texts ==
The only basic Nirvacana shastra (Nirukta-related text) that has survived from ancient times into the modern era is the one by Yaska, and it is simply called Nirukta. Three bhasya (commentaries) on Yaska's Nirukta have also survived. Additionally, a related work that is extant and is more ancient than the 5th-century BCE Nirukta by Yaska, is the Nighantu which is a lexicographic treatise. The Nighantu is a glossary or compilation of words in the Vedas, and is an example text of Abhidhanashastra (literally, science of words). However, Nighantu is not a dictionary, a genre of texts that developed in later centuries and was called a Kosha in Sanskrit. Yaska's Nirukta extensively refers to the Nighantu.

The three commentaries on Yaska's Nirukta text are by Hindu scholars named Durgasinha (also known as Durga) who likely lived before the 6th-century CE, Skanda-Mahesvara who may be two scholars who probably lived before the 5th-century CE, and Nilakantha who probably is from the 14th-century.

== Usage ==
=== Ancient ===
Yaska, in his famous text titled Nirukta, asserts that Rigveda in the ancient tradition, can be interpreted in three ways - from the perspective of religious rites (adhiyajna), from the perspective of the deities (adhidevata), and from the perspective of the soul (adhyatman). The fourth way to interpret the Rigveda also emerged in the ancient times, wherein the gods mentioned were viewed as symbolism for legendary individuals or narratives. It was generally accepted that creative poets often embed and express double meanings, ellipses and novel ideas to inspire the reader. Nirukta enables one to identify alternate embedded meanings that poets and writers may have included in old texts.

=== Medieval ===
Many examples of the rhetorical use of nirukta occur in Bhaskararaya's commentaries. Here is an example from the opening verse of his commentary on the Ganesha Sahasranama.

The opening verse includes Gaṇanātha as a name for Ganesha. The simple meaning of this name, which would have seemed obvious to his readers, would be "Protector of the Ganas", parsing the name in a straightforward way as gaṇa (group) + nātha (protector). But Bhaskararaya demonstrates his skill in nirukta by parsing it in an unexpected way as the Bahuvrīhi compound gaṇana + atha meaning "the one the enumeration (gaṇanaṁ) of whose qualities brings about auspiciousness. The word atha is associated with auspiciousness (maṅgalam)." This rhetorical flourish at the opening of the sahasranama demonstrates Bhaskaraya's skills in nirukta at the very beginning of his commentary on a thousand such names, including a clever twist appropriate to the context of a sahasranama.

== See also ==
- Cratylus (dialogue)
- Folk etymology
