= South Asia Collection at the University of Pennsylvania Libraries =

University research library in USA

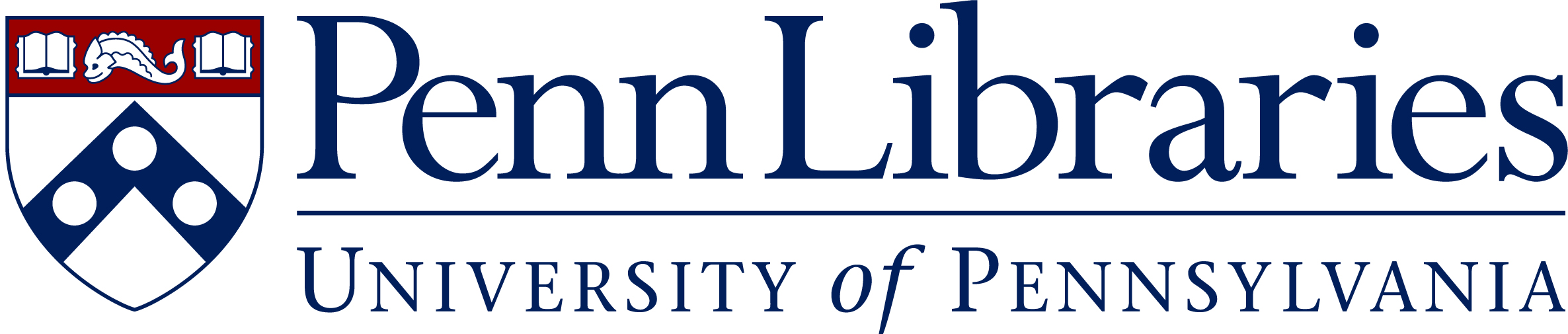
- Established: 1750
- Location: Philadelphia
- Key people: Constantia Constantinou, H. Carton Rogers III Vice Provost and Director of the Penn Libraries; Brigitte Weinsteiger, Associate Vice Provost for Collections and Scholarly Communication; Jef Pierce, South Asian Studies Librarian
- Parent organization: University of Pennsylvania

The University of Pennsylvania Libraries has one of the most important and largest collections of research material pertaining to the study of South Asia in the United States of America. Starting with the nineteenth century, when Sanskrit was first taught at the University of Pennsylvania, the Libraries have collected material for the study of South Asia.

== Bibliographers ==
The first bibliographer dedicated to South Asia Studies in the library was Kanta Bhatia. She retired in 1994, and was replaced by Dr. David Nelson. From 2011, Dr. Pushkar Sohoni served as the bibliographer and librarian, while teaching in the Department of South Asia Studies. In 2016, he left to teach at the Indian Institute of Science Education and Research, Pune. Since 2018, Dr. James (Jef) Pierce has served as the South Asian Studies Librarian.

== History of the South Asia Collection at the University of Pennsylvania Libraries ==
Prof. Morton W. Easton, Professor of Comparative Philology (1883–1912), taught Sanskrit courses at the University of Pennsylvania. He had studied Sanskrit at Yale under W.D. Whitney (1827–1894). Upon completing his dissertation on the evolution of language, Easton was awarded the first American doctorate in Sanskrit in 1872. The University of Pennsylvania was one of the first American academic institutions to offer courses in Sanskrit; already during the 1880s, the university offered a major and a minor in Sanskrit. Easton retired in 1912 and was replaced the following year by Franklin Edgerton. After Edgerton left in 1926, W. Norman Brown was appointed in his place. Brown was responsible for the creation of the Department of South Asia Studies and expanded well beyond his own Indological interests. From 1916 to 1919, Brown had held the position of the Harrison Research Fellow at the University of Pennsylvania. He organized the American Oriental Society in 1926. By the summer of 1947 Brown's summer program, "India: A Program of Regional Studies" was being offered at Penn. In 1948, he established the Department of South Asia Regional Studies, the first area studies department in North America. Offerings continued to be expanded until a full program was available in the 1949-1950 academic year. He brought together a number of eminent scholars such as Holden Furber, Stella Kramrisch, and Ernest Bender, ensuring that the Department of South Asia Studies at Penn became, and continues as, one of the most important places in the world for serious research on South Asia in general and Sanskrit in particular. Scholars such as George Cardona, Ludo Rocher, Rosane Rocher, and Richard D. Lambert worked at Penn throughout their careers, and ensured a rich collection was developed for the libraries.

W. Norman Brown was also responsible for helping to establish the well known PL 480 program which in its various permutations over the decades supplied us (and many other institutions) with literally hundreds of thousands of volumes from South Asia. During the course of the PL 480 program from 1954 to 1998, the library acquired material actively through the Library of Congress field offices (New Delhi and Islamabad), and also through various vendors in South Asia, Europe and North America. From 2013 to 2016, the South Asia Librarian also managed acquisitions from the Library of Congress Field Office in Jakarta. The Library of Congress still continues as a major vendor to supplement the activities of collecting all material including monographs, serials, film, and digital formats. Because of the history of the University of Pennsylvania Museum in the field of archaeology, the Penn Libraries also have one of the largest collection of material for archaeology in South Asia. The American Institute of Indian Studies (AIIS) was founded by W. Norman Brown, and it operated out of the Van Pelt Library till it moved to its present location in Chicago.

Since 1958, the University of Pennsylvania has had a Title VI National Resource Center for South Asia (South Asia Center). In 1992, the Center for Advanced Study of India (CASI) was launched. The two centers and the Department of South Asia Studies are supplemented by faculty with interests in South Asia, in various departments and schools across campus such as Anthropology, Architecture, Comparative Literature, Economics, Education, English, History, History of Art, Political Science, Religious Studies, and Sociology.

== Scope of Collection ==
=== Geographical coverage ===
The primary geographical coverage is South Asia which includes Afghanistan, Bangladesh, Bhutan, India, Maldives, Nepal, Pakistan, and Sri Lanka with some coverage of Tibet. Materials are also acquired which cover the diasporic community of South Asians in the U.S., UK, and elsewhere in the world outside of South Asia proper. Countries in South-East Asia and Inner Asia, such as Burma and Thailand, or Tajikistan and Uzbekistan, are covered selectively, only as they relate to inter-regional research interests.

=== Subject coverage ===
The primary focus is on the humanities and the social sciences with particular strength in the areas of anthropology, archaeology, art history, classical Indology, linguistics, literature, religion, philosophy and political science. There are no chronological limits to the collection, which covers material from the prehistoric period to the present. The Libraries acquire current publications in the disciplines mentioned above as well as actively seek to collect retrospectively in areas of research interests.

=== Languages ===
The languages covered by the South Asia Collections include Sanskrit (Vedic and Classical), Prakrit, Pali, Hindi and Urdu, and has large holdings, with an emphasis on belles-lettres, folklore, history, and linguistics, in Arabic, Bengali, Gujarati, Kannada, Kashmiri, Konkani, Malayalam, Marathi, Mongolian, Nepali, Punjabi, Persian, Rajasthani, Sindhi, Sinhalese, Tamil, and Telugu. The Penn Libraries also acquire publications in several of the lesser-known languages of the Subcontinent such as Baluchi, Brahui, Meitei, Newari, Pushto, and various tribal languages and dialects. The Libraries also acquire materials pertaining to the study of South Asia in English, French, German, Portuguese, Italian, Dutch, and Russian.

== Special Collections ==
These are materials acquired by various departments of the Penn Libraries that are housed in the Kislak Special Collections Center because of their unique, rare, or fragile nature. The number of items from or about South Asia in the Kislak Special Collections Center is difficult to estimate, as it comprises ephemeral materials, manuscripts, and rare or special books; the varied formats and contents do not easily lead to quantification, and many of them do not have call numbers. Some of the significant South Asia-related collections within the purview of the Kislak Special Collections Center are mentioned.

=== Indic Manuscripts ===
The Indic manuscripts collection (Ms. Coll. 390, and Ms. Indic 1 to 39) is the largest in North America, and one of the largest in the western hemisphere. Over 90% of these manuscripts are in Sanskrit. Scholarship about the collection itself has been substantial, not to mention the texts and illustrations within the actual manuscripts, which have been used by scholars. The history of the manuscripts has been narrated in many of these publications, and can be summarized thus: "Some of the manuscripts had been acquired in chance fashion by the Library and the University Museum before 1930, but in that year, at the request of Professor W. Norman Brown (1892-1975), Provost Josiah Penniman provided a sum of money to purchase Indic manuscripts. Shortly thereafter he obtained a donation from the late Mr. John Gribbel. Substantial contributions from Dr. Charles W. Burr, the Faculty Research Fund, and the Cotton Fund soon followed. The bulk of the manuscripts are the result of purchases made using these funds in India, between 1930 and 1935, under the direction of Professor W. Norman Brown." The manuscripts are regularly used in classes, and together with other manuscript and paper holdings of the University Museum and the Philadelphia Museum of Art, constitute an important corpus of texts in Sanskrit, Prakrit, and other languages of South and South-East Asia. Under an NEH grant, the entire collection was digitized and made openly available through the Penn in Hand portal; the collection also received enhanced cataloging by Dr. Benjamin Fleming at that time.

=== George Macartney Papers and colonial material ===
The Penn Libraries possesses an important collection of manuscripts and documents relating to the British East India Company and governance in South Asia, most notably the Macartney Papers, comprising letters and documents that belonged to Lord George Macartney during his time as the Governor of Madras (1780-1786). The Libraries also holds a series of manuscripts on 18th- and 19th-century East India politics collected by the historian Holden Furber (Professor, South Asia Studies, 1948 -1973). The manuscript collections for South Asia are enriched by additional travel narratives, ships’ logs, letters, and material on the military history of the East India Company, including the sieges of Seringapatnam and Bharatpur. There are also several other colonial items such as a letter from Wajid Ali Shah's secretary to the East India Company, early diaries of English officials and their wives in British India, and a series of 19th- and 20th-century photograph albums of Indian landscapes and city life, as well as rare prints and drawings of Indian scenes, buildings, and everyday life, offering scholars from diverse disciplines a unique perspective into South Asia. The voluminous private papers of Kanji Dwarkadass, an important labor organizer and political leader, are also available. There are several dozen photographic albums from the years between the wars that have been cataloged and all of them now have finding aids.

=== Miscellaneous Material ===
In addition to well-defined collections, the Kislak Special Collections Center also has eclectic material from South Asia, such as some of the early lithographed and printed books in various scripts, early bibles in multiple languages, and postcard sets published by the Archaeological Survey of India. Amar Chitra Katha comic books are also housed in Special Collections. There is also a valuable collection of late-nineteenth and early-twentieth century Judaica from India, some of which is housed in the Herbert D. Katz Center for Advanced Judaic Studies of the University of Pennsylvania. These materials include books in English, Hebrew, Judaeo-Arabic, and Marathi, and represent the Baghdadi, Bene-Israel and Cochin Jewish communities of India.

== Electronic Resources ==
=== Databases ===
In the past decade, the number of databases purchased by the Penn Libraries has increased as more archives and products become available. Journals are the other area where electronic formats are convenient and easy to use. Several journals which were offered online and in print are now purchased only in electronic form. The purchased or subscribed databases pertinent to South Asia alone are:

- "Empire Online". dla.library.upenn.edu.
- "Foreign Office Files: India, Pakistan, and Afghanistan".
- "The Times of India (1838-2005)". dla.library.upenn.edu.
- "History of Afghanistan Online". dla.library.upenn.edu.
- "India from Crown Rule to Republic, 1945-1949: Records of the U.S. State Department". dla.library.upenn.edu.
- "CMIE States of India". dla.library.upenn.edu.
- "India Stat". dla.library.upenn.edu.
- "India Raj and Empire". dla.library.upenn.edu.

These are in addition to the common platforms such as JStor or EBSCOHost, which provide access to many of the common English-language journals and serials, such as South Asian Studies, Modern Asian Studies, or Economic and Political Weekly.
In November 2010, the University of Pennsylvania Libraries joined HathiTrust, and approximately 2 million downloadable books in the public domain have been made available through the Penn Libraries since November 2014.

=== Newspapers ===
Daily newspapers used to be received in the South Asia Reading Room from India, Pakistan, Bangladesh and Sri Lanka, but now are mostly available online. For some historic newspaper collections, the World Newspaper Archive provides access: Ceylon Observer (1864-1922), Indian People (1903-1909), Kaysar-i Hind (1886-1890), Leader (1909-1922), Madras Mail (1868-1889), Pioneer (1865-1903), Tribune (1881-1922). The Proquest Historical Newspapers platform provides access to The Times of India (1838-2002).

== Microform ==
A very important, but often underutilized, source of information for South Asia is the microform collection which is located on the first floor in the Van Pelt Library. The formats are microfilm and microfiche. These sets are important because they represent important primary sources in the study of South Asia. Materials in microformats can be saved as PDFs or printed. Some of the highlights of the South Asia collections in these formats are listed below. This list is by no means exhaustive, but a quick sampling of the kinds of contents that are located in the microformat area. A detailed list of microform materials is to be found in the research guide Major Microform Sets in the Penn Library under the sub-heading of South Asian Studies. These are but a few of the thousands of titles available in our microformat collections, and till these resources are reprinted or republished online.

=== Biographies ===
For biographical materials, there is the very large set, the Indian Biographical Archives (Microfiche 1062). This collection is a single alphabetic cumulation of approximately 170 sources published from the mid-19th to the late 20th century. These sources, gathered from around the world, provide biographies on approximately 100,000 individuals. Geographically, it covers the whole of undivided India as it was in the pre-colonial and colonial period, thereby including the countries now known as Pakistan, Bangladesh and Sri Lanka. It covers the period from early times to the late 20th century, and includes the lives of sages, early rulers, missionaries, civil servants from all the colonial nations, lives of nationalists and freedom fighters, and many others. Biographies of individuals from other nations, such as British, French, and Portuguese individuals, whose lives were bound up in some way with the subcontinent, are also included.

=== Administrative Documents ===
There are several important sets in microprint, the British Parliamentary Papers (1713-1913) (Microfiche 110) [For details, see research guide for British Parliamentary sources and Government Documents], and the Early American Imprints (Microfiche 821 and Microprint 21). This later publication contains many interesting accounts of the early American interactions with India and South Asia.

=== Census Data ===
For critical historical statistical data, the census materials are important. The Indian Census sets from 1872-1951 (Microfiche 15).

=== Missionary Records ===
The records of Christian missionaries in South Asia, and their engagement with education and healthcare, can be accessed through microform sets from the Church Missionary Society (Microfilm 4469) and other similar missions.

=== Manuscripts ===
The important Sanskrit manuscript collection, The University of Pennsylvania Indic Manuscripts (Ms. Coll. 390), was microfilmed in the 1970s, and is available in a microformat (Microfiche 965). However, later acquisitions are not part of this catalog.

=== Newspapers ===
Many historic newspapers from South Asia are kept in the microtext area. The Penn Libraries, by virtue of being a member of the Center for Research Libraries (CRL), does not duplicate their holdings, as they are available to patrons by a special arrangement. If any of the CRL newspaper holdings are required for research, they can be requested. For details of their collection, please see CRL South Asia Holdings. Here is a list of some of the commonly used newspapers at the Penn Libraries:

- Aaj (1963-1996) Varanasi (Microfilm news 80)
- Anandabazaarapatrika (1963-1995) Calcutta (Microfilm news 4)
- Andhrapatrika (1963-1991) Madras (Microfilm news 5)
- Amrita bazar patrika (1962-1991, 1993-1996) Calcutta (Microfilm news 3)
- Bharat jyoti (1962) Bombay (Microfilm news 8)
- Blitz (1952-1971) Bombay (Microfilm news 219)
- Bombay courier (1793 - 1846) Bombay (Microfilm news 431)
- Business recorder (1966 - 1971) Karachi (Microfilm news 157)
- The Civil and Military Gazette (1886-1889, 1949-1950, 1960-1962) Lahore (Microfilm news 14)
- CrossRoads (1951 - 1953) Bombay (Microfilm news 313)
- Cutecamittiran (1963 - 1971) Madras (Microfilm news 66)
- Dawn (1949 - 1996) Karachi (Microfilm news 24)
- Daily jang (1954, 1961-1993) Karachi (Microfilm news 428)
- Deccan herald (1962-2005) Bangalore (Microfilm news 25)
- The Deccan Times weekly (1944-1950) Madras (Microfilm news 553)
- The Economic times (1962 - 1995) Bombay (Microfilm news 26)
- Free press journal (1962- 1971) Bombay (Microfilm news 2)
- The Hindu (1963 - 1997) Madras (Microfilm news 216)
- The Hindu weekly review (1962 - 1968) Madras (Microfilm news 218)
- The Hindustan Standard (1942-1982) Calcutta (Microfilm news 554)
- The Hindustan times (1962 - 1997) New Delhi (Microfilm news 30)
- Imroz (1963-June 1971) Lahore (Microfilm news 149)
- The India gazette, or, Calcutta public advertiser (1780 - 1782) Calcutta (Microfilm news 429)
- The Indian express (1962-1997, 2002-2004) New Delhi (Microfilm news 306)
- The Indian mirror (1886 - 1889) Calcutta (Microfilm news 144)
- The Indian spectator (1886-1889) Bombay (Microfilm news 142)
- The Lahore chronicle (1850-1868) Lahore (Microfilm news 432)
- Malayalam manorama (1963-1964,1966-1996) Kottayam (Microfilm news 41)
- National herald (1962-1994) Lucknow and Delhi (Microfilm news 45)
- Navashakti (1963-1971) Bombay (Microfilm news 46)
- New age (1952 - 1994) New Delhi (Microfilm news 238)
- Pakistan observer (1963-1971) Dacca (Microfilm news 86)
- Pakistan Times (1963-1996) Lahore (Microfilm news 231)
- People's age (1945 - 1949) Bombay (Microfilm news 313)
- People's war (1942 -1945) Bombay (Microfilm news 313)
- Pioneer (1886-1889, 1933-1948) Allahabad (Microfilm news 91)
- Pioneer mail and Indian weekly news (1911-1931) Allahabad (Microfilm news 92)
- Star of India (1942 - 1949) Calcutta (Microfilm news 64)
- The Statesman (1962-1970 1981-1995) Delhi (Microfilm news 65)
- Statesman, or, Friend of India (1941-1943) Calcutta (Microfilm News 649)
- The Statesman weekly (1964-1965) Calcutta (Microfilm news 237)
- The Times of India (1949-1966, 1990-1991, 1992-1995) Bombay (Microfilm news 71)
- The Times of India(1966-1989) New Delhi (Microfilm news 71)

== Audio and video material ==
Audio and video collecting have changed dramatically since the internet has made access to such media material extremely easy. There is no fixed policy on collecting audio or video from or about South Asia, but it is now largely dictated by student and research interests among the university community.

=== Video collection ===
While there is an effort to purchase many of the critically acclaimed titles in cinema, that interest is also largely driven from Cinema Studies. In terms of audio, gifts and approval plans are largely responsible for an increase in collections. All titles in the collection are available through the Penn Libraries Video Catalog (VCat). The video collection has been growing steadily over the past decade. The library continues to actively collect documentary films and cinema that is difficult to access, particularly if requested by faculty and students. A small fraction of the titles continue to be on VHS tape. As of 2015, the languages most represented in the video collection by title are Hindi (1,258), Bengali (186), Kannada (162), Urdu (150), Tamil (127), Telugu (88), Marathi (42), Malayalam (40), and Pushto (40). The Penn Libraries also have video holdings in languages such as Vietnamese (24), Bahasa Indonesia (21), Sanskrit (19), Bhojpuri (6), Kashmiri (5), among others.

=== Audio collection ===
The audio collection is largely on audio tapes, and is not actively collected. Dr. Allyn Miner led the first and only performing arts component attached to a South Asia Studies department in the United States. Material is acquired largely on request. Till the landscape of copyright regulations and reformatting is understood, and until issues of stability and reliability of media formats in South Asia are addressed, video and audio acquisitions continue to be ad hoc and driven by demand only.

== South Asia Art Archive ==
The South Asia Art Archive at the University of Pennsylvania Libraries was set up in W. Norman Brown's office in 1979 as a national facility, open to all who are interested in the study of Indian art. The holdings of the South Asia Art Archive currently consist of around 115,000 black-and-white photographs (classified by period and region), site and museum indexes, and ca 4,000 color slides. (In addition, the University has a teaching collection of more than 15,000 South Asia slides, most of which are online at the Fine Arts Image Collection. By agreement with the American Institute of Indian Studies and the Smithsonian Foreign Currencies Program which funded the AIIS Gurgaon Center, photographs added to the Gurgaon archive are also added to the archive in Philadelphia, keeping the archive current.

== South Asian Studies Seminar Room ==
The seminar room for South Asian Studies is located in the Van Pelt Library, and has a small reference section containing approximately 2,500 titles. Current atlases and maps are also maintained in the reading room. An area within the room is dedicated to serials, and contains about 50 popular and academic journals in 12 languages. The space is regularly used for classes pertaining to South Asia, and also for special events and lectures. The Seminar Room is also used for accessing Special Collections material under supervision for groups of students, by special arrangement. The Seminar Room also has four carrels and sixteen lockers, which are charged to graduate students who work on South Asia with permission of the South Asian Studies Librarian. Similarly, classes can be scheduled with permission.

== Partnerships and Consortia ==
The South Asian Studies Librarian is a member of the Committee on South Asia Libraries and Documentation (CONSALD), and the South Asia Materials Project (SAMP). The University of Pennsylvania Libraries are in several regional and national consortia, including Borrow Direct and E-Z Borrow. The South Asia Center at Penn, and the Center for Advanced Study of India have a large number of affiliated fellows, academics from the region and around the globe, who use the South Asia collection for their research.
