= George Cardona =

American linguist and indologist (born 1963)

- Born: June 3, 1936 (age 90); New York City, U.S.
- Years active: Early 1960s ‒ Present
- Known for: Scholarship in Indo-European, Indo-Aryan, Vedic, Vyākaraṇa, Pāṇinian, and general historical linguistics
- Title: Professor Emeritus of Linguistics
- Board member of: President of the American Oriental Society (1989-1990)

Academic background
- Education: New York University (BA); Yale University (MA, PhD)
- Thesis: Indo-European Thematic Aorists (1960)
- Doctoral advisor: Paul Thieme
- Influences: Pāṇini, Paul Thieme, Pt. Jagannath S. Pade Shastri, Pt. Ambika Prasad Upadhyaya, Pt. K.S. Krishnamurti Shastri, Pt. Raghunatha Sharma

Academic work
- Era: Contemporary
- Discipline: Linguistics
- Sub-discipline: Indology and Indian linguistics
- Main interests: Pāṇinian linguistics; Sanskrit grammar and culture
- Notable works: Studies in Indian grammarians, I: The method of description reflected in the śivasūtras (1969); Pāṇini: A Survey of Research (1976); Pāṇini: His work and its traditions (1988); Recent Research in Pāṇinian Studies (1999)
- Influenced: Madhav M. Deshpande, Peter E. Hook, Peter M. Scharf
- Website: ling.upenn.edu/people/cardona

George Cardona (/kɑːrˈdoʊnə/; born June 3, 1936) is an American linguist, Indologist, Sanskritist, and scholar of Pāṇini. Described as "a luminary" in Indo-European, Indo-Aryan, and Pāṇinian linguistics since the early sixties, Cardona has been recognized as the leading Western scholar of the Indian grammatical tradition (vyākaraṇa) and of the great Indian grammarian Pāṇini. He is currently professor emeritus of Linguistics and South Asian Studies at the University of Pennsylvania. Cardona was credited by Mohammad Hamid Ansari, the vice president of India, for making the University of Pennsylvania a "center of Sanskrit learning in North America", along with Professors W. Norman Brown, Ludo Rocher, Ernest Bender, Wilhelm Halbfass, and several other Sanskritists.

== Early life and education ==
George Cardona was born in New York City on June 3, 1936.

Cardona obtained his BA from New York University in 1956, and his MA and PhD degrees from Yale in 1958 and 1960, respectively. His dissertation advisor at Yale was Paul Thieme, who worked primarily in Vedic studies and Sanskrit grammar. Cardona's PhD was in linguistics with a specialization in Indo-European ‒ by this time he had already begun studying Sanskrit grammar (vyākaraṇa) and related areas (especially nyāya and mīmāṃsā).

== Career ==
In 1962–63, Cardona went to Gujarat state, India, where he worked on his A Gujarati reference grammar, as well as furthering his understanding of Sanskrit and Indian grammatical tradition. While in India, Cardona studied under the tutelage of native Indian gurus, including Jagannath S. Pade Shastri (his first Indian mentor and to whom his most significant work, Pāṇini: His Work and its Traditions, is dedicated), Ambika Prasad Upadhyaya, K.S. Krishnamurti Shastri, and Raghunatha Sharma.

=== University of Pennsylvania ===
Cardona taught Hindi and other modern Indic languages at the University of Pennsylvania. There, his earlier work in Indo-European studies at Yale slowly gave way to work primarily in Indo-Iranian and Indo-Aryan. His work on Indian grammar gained steam after his exposition of the Ṥivasūtras in 1969. After this point he directed the majority of his scholarly attention toward further vyākaraṇa scholarship and analysis of various aspects of the Aṣṭādhyāyī (lit. 'eight chapters'), which eventually culminated in his Pāṇini: His Work and Its Traditions in 1988, a current work-in-progress projected to be eight volumes.

Cardona's large body of work and publications have reflected scholarly depth and intensity throughout his professional career.

=== Achievements and honors ===
He has been formally recognized for his achievements numerous times: he was granted The Woodrow Wilson National Fellowship while working on his PhD; in 1971–72, he was admitted as a fellow of the Center for Advanced Studies in the Behavioral Sciences, Palo Alto; was selected as the Collitz Professor at the Summer Institute of the Linguistic Society of America at the University of Illinois (1978); was elected in 1984 and 1997 to the American Academy of Arts and Sciences and the American Philosophical Society, respectively; and served as President of the American Oriental Society from 1989 to 1990. He is also known as an authority on Gujarati, for which he has been honored with membership in the Gujarati Sāhitya Pariṣad. And, notably, on November 21, 2016, Cardona was awarded (along with Thai Princess, Maha Chakri Sirindhorn) the World Sanskrit Award from the Indian Council on Cultural Relations.

== Research ==
=== Background ===
Cardona's career began in the 1950s and '60s as indological studies, especially studies in traditional Sanskrit grammar, burgeoned throughout the United States. Cardona entered the scene of indological studies at the closing of a disciplinary era dominated by the legacies of Bopp, Whitney, and Bloomfield ‒ which triad of thinkers had established a discipline that relied less upon, and on occasion pointedly opposed, native Indian tradition itself, in order to accomplish overtly historical and comparative objectives. Thus the emerging indological discipline of Cardona's early career differentiated itself by rejecting what it saw as the unappreciating and therefore skewed appraisal of Indian tradition by early Western indological tradition (i.e. comparative linguistics and, a bit later, philological indology), instead emphasizing an approach it characterized as historically descriptive interpretation of Indian thinkers and their works ‒ that is, to get at what Indian thinkers "sought to achieve in their writings, and how they went about doing it". The disciplinary orientations of both early and late Western indology remain discernable throughout Cardona's career, as when, in a methodological controversy, J.F. Staal characterizes Cardona as a historically motivated philologist, but identifies himself (Staal) as, above all, a linguist in the tradition of Whitney (with respect to Whitney's methodological approach).

On the whole, Cardona has been widely recognized as a champion of the indology that seeks an interior ‒ if not a simply historical ‒ understanding of the intentions and aims of Indian grammarians. This is evidenced, for instance, by Cardona's sometimes unorthodox commitment to interpreting Indian grammatical treatises in line with the traditional treatment of the munitraya (lit. 'the trio of sages') ‒ Pāṇini, Kātyāyana, and Patañjali. Moreover, concerning his work on the Aṣṭādhyāyī, Cardona has contributed to an ongoing debate as to how the design of Pāṇini's grammar ought to be conceptualized: in terms of modern linguistic insight; the native exegetical tradition; or some fusion of the two. These debates have resulted in much dispute about scholarly orientation toward and treatment of this grammatical treatise ‒ case in point being Cardona's dispute with J.F. Staal and Sergiu Al-George on the relation of Pāṇini to generative formalism (see below).

Cardona has worked alongside a number of other scholars, who have, as a collective, both constituted an intellectual backdrop for Cardona and mutually constructed an interdependent network of collegiate industry with him. These persons include: Rosane Rocher, Barend van Nooten Hartmut Scharfe, J.F. Staal, Paul Kiparsky, Hans Hock, Madhav Deshpande, Rama Nath Sharma, and Peter Scharf.

=== Perspectives ===
==== Indology ====
Indology as a discipline involves textual criticism and exegesis for the purposes of historical and cultural explanation. Cardona's involvement in this field has concerned the analysis and interpretation of ancient Indian grammatical treatises. One puzzle in this sub-field involves the absolute and relative dating of grammatical texts. While scholars of previous generations ‒ such as Albrecht Weber, Bruno Liebich, and Sylvain Lévi ‒ did not shy away from making claims about dating these texts, Cardona summed up the prevailing contemporary sentiment when he concluded: 'non liquet' (Latin for 'it is not clear').

Another issue in Indology is the translation of Indian grammatical treatises. Cardona's take on this matter underscores the inevitable inadequacy ‒ indeed, the "useless[ness]" ‒ of translation. Cardona's reasoning for this derives from the nature of the Aṣṭādhyāyī and other grammatical compositions themselves: especially for the former (which was designed to be memorized), the structure of these texts prioritizes economical exposition and so they read more like a series of mathematical formulas than spoken prose. Following from this, Cardona holds the view that translations often end up "less clear than the original texts."

An additional task of indology is the relating of texts to each other. In fact, Cardona stands out as a dedicated scholar of not only the Aṣṭādhyāyī, but also of all the later daughter commentaries of this cornerstone text.

==== Indian linguistics ====
As a field, Indian linguistics is concerned with the examination of Indian linguistic methods and inquiry insofar as Indian thinkers have fielded linguistic insight ‒ thus, from a conventional standpoint, the fact that these linguistic methods have to do with India is incidental. Indian linguistics is Cardona's primary area of activity and expertise. Rocher identified the central concern of this field when she observed (writing in 1975) that Cardona's then in-progress Panini: His Work and Its Traditions (1988, 1997) would "reflect the fact that present day research is essentially [tied up] with methodology."

===== Pāṇini's Method of Linguistic Description =====
====== Meta-terminology and Meta-rules ======
Linguistic description necessarily employs technical and metalinguistic terminology. On this matter, Cardona has defended the view that the immediate context surrounding a term should determine its meaning. This stands in contrast to the perspective held by his direct teacher, Paul Thieme, who argued that technical terms have a "single interpretation" and that their meaning remains consistent across commentaries and grammars. Related to the defining of technical terminology is examining how it operates (in a given text). In his article, Studies in Indian Grammarians, I: The method of description reflected in the śivasūtras, Cardona discusses the metalanguage employed therein and how it accomplishes Pāṇini's methodological aim, namely, economy. In a review of this work, Rocher takes, in fact, as Cardona's chief contribution "the refinement brought to the principle of economy." In other words, what Cardona has accomplished here, Rocher elaborates, is a conscientious investment into and explication of the (intellectual) procedure of generalization as it features within the practice of descriptive economy (of grammar) itself; thus, infers Rocher, the terse concision of the grammarians ought to be the object itself of further study. All in all then, Rocher attributes to Cardona originality insofar as he keeps to the Indian tradition in methodology, which enables Cardona to translate, so to speak, the scholastic vernacular of ancient India into modern Western parlance. Cardona himself concludes, after much elaboration, that his achievement in this paper is to have situated "how the śivasūtras fit into the general method of description followed by Pāṇini", which leads to a related, but distinct insight, namely, that Pāṇini's contribution to the Indian grammatical tradition was primarily methodological, otherwise being quite conservative within his (Pāṇini's) intellectual milieu.

Not all scholars have commended Cardona's The method of description reflected in the śivasūtras. Harald Millonig, for instance, appraises Cardona's study of the śivasūtras as more or less comprehensive, but ultimately deficient in its attention to detail, particularly with regard to the relationships between the text and the pratyāhāra-sūtras. Staal offers an even more critical review: he argues, first of all, that Cardona's explication of the śivasūtras is not especially imbued with originality. Nonetheless, Staal credits Cardona for a more explicit formulation of Pāṇinian economy. This explicit formulation, according to Staal, gets across the idea that Pāṇini engaged in the practice of abbreviation not for the sake of brevity for its own sake, but rather conceived of descriptive abbreviation as an instrument of mediating between sāmānya 'the general' and viśeṣa 'the particular'.

Despite Cardona's more explicit formulation, Staal first points out that some post-Pāṇinian grammarians employed abbreviation more than Pāṇini did, in fact. Secondly, Staal observes that scholars H.E. Buiskool (1934) and Barend Faddegon (1936) were well aware that Pāṇinian methodology exercised abbreviation for the sake of insinuating functionality into and expressing generalization in grammatical treatment. Finally, asserts Staal, there are many instances of abbreviation in Pāṇini that do not evince Cardona's lofty characterization of Pāṇinian economy: non-functional abbreviation abounds. As a case in point, Staal cites the following:

"1.1.3 iko guṇavṛddhī is a meta-linguistic statement dealing with the use of the technical terms guṇa and vṛddhī. The next sūtra, 1.1.4 na dhātulope ārdhadhātuke, with anuvṛtti of guṇavṛddhī from the previous rule, is a rule which treats a special case where guṇa and vṛddhī, despite other rules, do not take place. Thus this case of anuvṛtti is entirely non-functional and ad hoc" (emphasis added).

====== How Grammar Relates to Logic ======
An additional area of controversy relevant to the study of Pāṇini's method of linguistic description that has attracted Cardona's attention is how grammar relates to logic. His separate treatments of negations in Pāṇini and of the terms anvaya and vyatireka in the Mahābhāṣya have each sought to determine how Indian grammarians' usage of technical terms has evinced metalinguistic meaning. Once again, Cardona differs from Staal here ‒ the latter combines linguistic, logical, and philosophical usage in his analysis of the relationship between grammar and logic.

====== The Kārakas Controversy ======
A disciplinary debate ‒ also having to do with Pāṇini's method of linguistic description ‒ arose during the '60s (when syntax dominated linguistic studies) concerning the notion of kārakas (a concept in the grammar of Pāṇini, roughly similar to the concept of thematic role or theta role), as it "touches the core of syntax." Cardona has maintained the view (since the debate began) that the kārakas are essentially linguistic, syntactic-semantic categories ‒ not non-linguistic or extra-linguistic ones as put forth by Rocher and Al-George on the basis of a lack of correspondence between the Indian notion of 'agent,' a kind of kārakas, and a fixed linguistic expression (compare the correspondence between the grammatical category of 'subject' and its linguistic expression, the nominative). A subset of this debate is Al-George's claim that kārakas issue from "Vedic ritual categories," which Cardona has criticized greatly. Whereas Al-George's supplies extraneous elements to his analysis of the kārakas (he invokes European structuralism), Cardona's position is rooted in Pāṇini's text itself.

==== General linguistics and Indian grammatical tradition ====
Beginning in the '60s, attempts at formalization of the Aṣṭādhyāyī developed. These attempts at formalization entailed the comparison of modern Western and ancient Indian grammatical traditions. Since formalizing Pāṇinian rules also amounts to translating them into a different language, so to speak, scholars such as Cardona explored the issue of how ‒ or even whether ‒ comparisons of this sort could be carried out. On this matter, Cardona is well known for having said:

"I do not think we have yet arrived at a sufficiently detailed understanding of Indian grammatical methods to make a comparison with Western methods truly useful. After such an understanding has been attained, it will be both welcome and valuable to make comparisons."

Back and forth with Staal on this point elicited a spirited response in Staal (1967). Staal attributes to Cardona a scholarly approach that is "historically" informed, and identifies him most essentially as a "philologist". On the other hand, Staal considers himself most essentially as a "linguist", approaching his subject "systematically". Staal then points out that "[t]he scope for mutual contradiction between these two approaches is fairly narrow". This narrow scope, nonetheless, evidently affords Cardona the opportunity to wonder whether Staal thought that Pāṇini "started from scratch" in his composition of the śivasūtras (thus, from Cardona's point of view, Staal was ignoring one of Cardona's central theses that Pāṇini was deeply indebted to the Indian grammatical tradition). Staal claims that Cardona has misinterpreted him. He then goes on to dispute, in fact, that there is not so much of a difference between himself and Cardona when it comes to studying the śivasūtras "in terms of 'the grammatical structure of the language' as analysed in the rules of the grammarians." The point of Staal's reasoning here is that while his own and Cardona's emphases may differ, these emphases nonetheless get at the same object of study (whether that be the śivasūtras, the Aṣṭādhyāyī, or other grammatical treatises) and with the same disciplinary intent, namely, to study "the grammatical structure of the language."

Yet Staal criticizes Cardona's methodological prioritization of historically informed philology over systematically informed linguistics, citing Cardona as having remarked (above) that comparison of "Indian grammatical methods" with "Western methods" would be unprofitable since insight into the former remains limited. Staal sees this as "remarkably naïve" and invokes William Dwight Whitney's legacy, making a claim to the effect that actual comparison of Indian grammatical methods and Western methods is unwarranted in fact ‒ for, after all, Pāṇini's primary status as a linguist, and not as a philologist, demands that he be treated as such, in Staal's view. As a consequence, Staal maintains, scholars ought to aim at "a detailed understanding of Indian grammatical methods", insofar as that aids assessing Pāṇini as a linguist.

Whether these attempts at comparison are premature is beside the point, according to some scholars, since people are performing this kind of comparison and they are doing it more often; what can be done is to assess the adequacy of these attempts. Cardona has persistently upheld the view, as referred to elsewhere, that translations (or 'comparisons') ought to be of a strict sort. To achieve this he has supplied four objectives upon which to carry out translation, namely:

1. the formalization should not merely be an adaptation of Indian grammatical terms into Western ones;
2. it should not obfuscate the differences between the method of Pāṇini and that of other Indian grammarians;
3. it should put on display how Pāṇinian commentators interpreted the same rules differently;
4. and finally, "modern interpreters should recognize their inability to arrive at a unique solution.

These rules of thumb evince Cardona's concern with the tampering of Pāṇini's rules ‒ indeed, he argues that fidelity to the text and tradition in these respects supersedes the importance of absolute clarity. The criterion of scholars such as Staal, on the other hand, permits the incorporation of elements of general linguistic theory into formalizations on the basis of expediency. Other scholars hold the view ‒ which Cardona rejects outright as uncritical ‒ that Western grammatical terms on concepts can be directly imposed onto Indian ones. This approach seems to hold in light of the view that, long ago, Indian grammarians anticipated modern developments in Western linguistics. Cardona has dismissed this kind of historical precursorism.

==== Collaboration with other scholars ====
Regier and Wallace (1991) observe Cardona's ire against Whitney and Goldstücker; for the former in particular, Cardona has criticized Whitney for his "linguistic prejudice" and "more than a little arrogance." Furthermore, Cardona seems to think that Whitney's assumptions inescapably tainted his methodology, hence the disagreement between Staal and Cardona, discussed above. On the other hand, Cardona has looked amiably upon the work of scholars Kielhorn, Renou, and Yudhiṣṭhira Mīmāṃsaka.

==== Criticisms ====
Scholars other than Staal have criticized Cardona's work, especially in his earlier period. Durbin, for instance, claims that Cardona's A Gujarati Reference Grammar inadequately meets the author's own goals of serving 1) as an audio-lingual textbook for students, being "too sketchy, ill-organized, and defective" and 2) as a resource for linguists in Indic studies (Durbin claims this work would actually be more useful for the amateur needing a general grammatical overview of an Indo-Aryan language). In particular, she heavily criticizes Cardona's "disturbing" coverage on morphophonemics, which she claims is simply too small; ignores the interlinking of "different morphophonemic rules" to each other (which extends itself to a scanty description of rule ordering); and, lastly, incompletely specifies "the conditions of certain morphophonemic rules" such that a "rule becomes non-applicable in certain cases". As an instance of this last criticism, Durbin cites Rule 1b10 where /CəC-VC/ → /CCVC/ (i.e. a facultative phonologically conditioned rule where, in this particular kind of grammatical transformation of a word, schwa, 'ə', is deleted between consonants). Cardona cites the following two examples as instances of this rule: 1) /tərət-əj/ 'right away' ~ /tərtəj/ (this reads as: "the form /tərət-əj/ alternates with the form /tərtəj/ (in different grammatical derivations)") and 2) /wəkhət-e/ 'at the time' ~ /wəkte/. Durbin points out, however, that Cardona's rule is underspecified, with the consequence that examples like /rəm-aṛ/ 'to cause to play' are apparent exceptions to the rule ‒ in other words, the schwa in '/rəm-aṛ/' does not undergo deletion, which Cardona's rule does not account for. Durbin goes to show how formulating this rule as /#(C)VCəC-VC/ → /#(C)VCCVC/ (where schwa is in a non-initial and unstressed syllable) captures Cardona's examples while accounting (or not accounting, rather) for examples like /rəm-aṛ/: it is no longer an exception to Cardona's rule, but rather simply inapplicable to it. I. R. states that Cardona's A Gujarati Reference Grammar succeeds as first coherent descriptive grammar in the language, but fails as a language course and would likely only be useful to a reader who is already familiar with Gujarati or another Indo-Aryan language. He also notes some of Cardona's points could be challenged or questioned.

Another criticism of Cardona's work has come from Szemerényi: his review of Cardona's Haplology in Indo-European centers primarily on the volume's thinness of "substance", as well as its physical thinness. As far as the "substance" of the volume goes, Szemerényi starts straight away by singling out Cardona's dictum that "haplology is not essentially separable from regular sound change amenable to formulation in terms of what are called sound laws". The majority of the review goes on to criticize this thesis as untenable because of its insensitivity to an essential difference between what Szemerényi contends are two different types of sound change governing the realization of haplology: 1) regular group-changes and 2) irregular (sporadic) group-changes. The former, Szemerényi specifies, "cover general[ized] rules of assimilation and dissimilation", for instance the dissimilation of the sequence l-l to l-r in Latin. The latter, on the other hand, cover idiosyncratic changes such as isolated Greek examples of vowel harmony: Attic Korkura from Kerkura 'name of an island', or kromuon beside kremuon 'leek'. Szemerényi's issue with Cardona's analysis, then, is directed not toward his specific treatment of Indian -yā́-, Vedic -si-, and Latin forms like dixti per se, but rather toward Cardona's wider claim (in agreement with Hoenigswald (1964), from whom Cardona carried over the idea) that haplology, in relation to these forms, is a regular sound change. And yet even as far as the discussion of Latin forms goes, Szemerényi observes that haplologized models dixti and dixem co-existed alongside original longer forms dixisti, dixissem, respectively ‒ that is, there were haplologized models that "never won out". Thus, Szemerényi infers, Cardona's decidedly neogrammarian analysis is in this case inappropriate as, after all, "sound laws suffer no exception". Cardona's attempts to maintain that Latin forms like dixti are instances of haplology-as-regular-sound-change are ultimately sized up by Szemerényi as "mere postulate[s], contradicted by facts". Despite Szemerényi's differences with Cardona on the main thesis of his On Haplology in Indo-European, he commends the descriptions of Indian -yā́- forms (sections §§1-3) and Vedic -si- forms (section §5).

Finally, Cardona's seminal work Pāṇini: His Work and Its Traditions, while generally praised for its lucidity, profundity, and comprehensiveness, has not entirely escaped critique. Hartmut Scharfe, for instance, criticizes Cardona heavily for his "excessive reliance" on the native Indian tradition and his consequent reluctance to break with tradition and adopt modern scholarship. Bhattacharya, wary of criticizing Cardona on matters relating to Pāṇini because of Cardona's distinguished authority, also notes several of Cardona's departures from conventional analyses. This includes, for instance, Cardona's deliberate commitment to the Indian commentarial tradition in its analysis of accent derivation.

== Legacy ==
Cardona's legacy is most felt in the discipline of Indian linguistics where he has exemplified ‒ indeed, championed ‒ an approach that seeks to describe and appreciate the techniques of the Indian grammarians. To an extent, Cardona may be characterized as 'historical' and 'philological' in his methodology. However, Cardona has concerned himself with the textual and historically explanatory aims of these approaches ‒ which were, in fact, the goals of earlier philological indology ‒ only insofar as they have enabled him to recover and uncover the linguistic science itself encoded in texts like Pāṇini's Aṣṭādhyāyī. In other words, textual analysis and historical explanation are incidental to Cardona's central priority to treat Pāṇini as an Indian linguist. As fidelity to the tradition figures prominently for Cardona, he has been mostly critical of attempts to compare Pāṇini and the Pāṇinīyas with modern Western grammatical notions. This stance, moreover, has served as a wellspring for debate, most notably with J.F. Staal and Paul Kiparsky. Along these lines, Brian Joseph's depiction of Cardona as a "luminary" in Pāṇinian linguistics warrants an assessment of Cardona as a veritable Pāṇinīya, carrying on the age-old exegetical tradition of Pāṇini's Aṣṭādhyāyī.

== Publications ==
1962

- R̥gvedic śrúvat. Journal of the Oriental Institute, Baroda 12:1-4

1963

- Greek heîsa and Sanskrit sátsat. Language 39:14-16

1964

- The formulation of Pāṇini. 7.3.73. Journal of the Oriental Institute, Baroda 14:38-41

1965

- A Gujarati reference grammar. Philadelphia: University of Pennsylvania Press, pp. 188 [circulated in duplicated form (pp. xv, 305), 1964]
- On translating and formalizing Pāṇinian rules. Journal of the Oriental Institute, Baroda 14:306-314

1966

- The Indo-European thematic aorists. University Microfilms. Pp. 159 [doctoral dissertation, defended in 1960]

1967

- Negations in Pāṇinian rules. Language 43 (Bloch Memorial Volume):34-56
- Pāṇini's syntactic categories. Journal of the Oriental Institute, Baroda 16:201-215

1968

- On haplology in Indo-European. Philadelphia: University of Pennsylvania Press (=Haney Foundation Series 1), pp. 87

1969

- Studies in Indian grammarians, I: The method of description reflected in the śivasūtras. Transactions of the American Philosophical Society, new series, 59.1, p. 48

1970

- Some principles of Pāṇini's grammar. Journal of Indian Philosophy 1:40-74
- The Indo-Iranian construction manā [mama] kr̥tam. Language 46:1-12
- A note on Pāṇini's technical vocabulary. Journal of the Oriental Institute, Baroda 19:195-212

1974

- Pāṇini's kārakas: agency, animation and identity. Journal of Indian Philosophy 2:231-306

1976

- Pāṇini, a survey of research (Trends in linguistics, state of the art reports, 6) The Hague: Mouton, pp. xvi, 384 [new editions: 1980, 1998]

1979

- Gujarati language and literature. Encyclopedia Americana 13:596

1988

- Pāṇini: His work and its traditions. Part I: General introduction and background. Delhi: Motilal Banarsidass, pp. xxiv, 671 [second edition: 1997]

1989

- Pāṇinian studies. New Horizons of research in Indology, edited by V.N. Jha (Silver Jubilee volume of the Centre of Advanced Study in Sanskrit, Pune), pp. 49–84

1992

- Indian grammatical traditions and historical linguistics. in E. Polomé-W. Winter (eds.), Reconstructing Languages and Cultures. (Berlin, New York: Mouton de Gruyter), pp. 239–259

1995

- On Pāṇini, Śākalya, Vedic dialects and Vedic exegetical traditions. Beyond the Texts: New Approaches to the Study of the Vedas, edited by M. Witzel, pp. 26–32

1999

- Recent Research in Pāṇinian Studies. Delhi: Motilal Banarsidass, pp. xi, 372 [second edition: 2004]

2007

- On the position of vyākaraṇa and Pāṇini. Expanding and Merging Horizons, Contributions to South Asia and Cross Cultural Studies in Commemoration of Wilhelm Halbfass, edited by Karin Preisendanz (Beiträge zur Kultur- und Geistesgeschichte Asiens, Sitzungsberichte der philosophischen-historischen Klasse der Österreichischen Akademie der Wissenschaften), pp. 693 – 710
- Pāṇini and Pāṇinīyas on what is and is not possible. Colonel Henry Scott Olcott Death Centenary Commemoration Volume, Brahmavidyā, The Adyar Library Bulletin 68 - 70 (2004 - 2006):467 - 499 [see 2002]

2011

- Indological Researches: Different Standpoints, edited by P. C. Muraleemadhavan. Kalady: Sree Sankarachary University of Sanskrit.

2014

- Pāṇinian grammarians on agency and independence. Free Will, Agency and Selfhood in Indian Philosophy, edited by Edwin Bryant and Matthew Dasti, Oxford/New York, Oxford University Press, pp. 85–111.
- Some contributions of ancient Indian thinkers to linguistics. In Sanskrit and Development of World Thought (Proceedings of "The International Seminar on the Contribution of Sanskrit to Development of World Thought"), edited by Vempaty Kutumba Sastry, Delhi: D.K. Printworld and Rashtriya Sanskti Sansthan, pp. 1–22.

=== Reviews ===
- Durbin, Mridula Adenwala (1968). "A Gujarati Reference Grammar (review)". Language. 44 (2): 411–420. doi:10.2307/411641. JSTOR 411641.
- Szemerényi, O (1970). "On haplology in Indo-European (review)". Language. 46 (1): 140–146. doi:10.2307/412415. JSTOR 412415.
- Millonig, Harald (1973). "Studies in Indian grammarians, I: The method of description reflected in the śivasūtras (review)". Zeitschrift der Deutschen Morgenländischen Gesellschaft. 123 (2): 424–427.
- Rocher, Rosane (1969). "Studies in Indian grammarians, I: The method of description reflected in the śivasūtras (review)". Journal of the American Oriental Society. 89 (4): 788–789. doi:10.2307/596956. JSTOR 596956.
- Staal, J.F. 1970 Studies in Indian grammarians, I: The method of description reflected in the śivasūtras (review). Language 46: 2, part 1, pp. 502–507.
- Rocher, Rosane (1980). "Pāṇini, a survey of research (review)". Journal of the American Oriental Society. 100 (1): 59–60. doi:10.2307/601408. JSTOR 601408.
- Bhattacharya, Kamaleswar (2007). "Pāṇini: His work and its traditions. Part I: General introduction and background (review)". Journal of the American Oriental Society. 127 (1): 102–103.
- Brockington, J.L. (1990). "Pāṇini: His work and its traditions. Part I: General introduction and background (review)". The Journal of the Royal Asiatic Society of Great Britain and Ireland. 1: 182–183. doi:10.1017/S0035869X00108202.
- Laddu, S.D. (1989). "Pāṇini: His work and its traditions. Part I: General introduction and background (review)". Annals of the Bhandarkar Oriental Research Institute. 70 (1/4): 350–353.
- Regier, Willis G.; Wallace, Rex E. (1991). "Pāṇini: His work and its traditions. Part I: General introduction and background (review)". Language. 67 (1): 163–166. doi:10.2307/415552. JSTOR 415552.
- Scharfe, Hartmut (1989). ""Something Old and Something New: Two Traditional Approaches to Pāṇini", Pāṇini: His Work and Its Traditions (review)". Journal of the American Oriental Society. 109 (4): 653–658. doi:10.2307/604091. JSTOR 604091.
- Wright, J.C. (1990). "Pāṇini: His work and its traditions. Part I: General introduction and background (review)". Bulletin of the School of Oriental and African Studies, University of London. 53 (1): 152–154. doi:10.1017/s0041977x0002156x.
- Brockington, J.L. (1993). "Pāṇinian Studies, Professor S.D. Joshi Felicitation Volume (review)". Journal of the Royal Asiatic Society. 3 (3): 474–475. doi:10.1017/s1356186300014449.
- Rocher, Rosane (1995). "Pāṇinian Studies, Professor S.D. Joshi Felicitation Volume (review)". Journal of the American Oriental Society. 115 (4): 700. doi:10.2307/604749. JSTOR 604749.
- Salomon, Richard (1994). "Pāṇinian Studies, Professor S.D. Joshi Felicitation Volume (review)". Pacific Affairs. 67 (1): 140–141. doi:10.2307/2760150. JSTOR 2760150.
- Kulikov, L.I. (2004). "Recent Research in Pāṇinian Studies (review)". The Canadian Journal of Linguistics. 49 (1): 121–124. doi:10.1353/cjl.2004.0043. S2CID 145527829.
- Haag, Pascale. Madhav M. Deshpande et Peter E. Hook (éd.) : Indian Linguistic Studies. Festschrift in Honor of George Cardona. In: Bulletin de l'École Française d'Extrême-Orient. Tome 90–91, 2003. pp. 504–509.
- Hinüber, O.V. (2004). "Indian Linguistic Studies: Festschrift in Honor of George Cardona (review)". Indo-Iranian Journal. 47 (3/4): 339–340. doi:10.1007/s10783-005-1686-0. S2CID 161904870.
- Hock, H.H. (2006). "Indian Linguistic Studies: Festschrift in Honor of George Cardona (review)". Journal of the American Oriental Society. 126 (1): 108–111.
- Joseph, Brian D (2006). "Indian Linguistic Studies: Festschrift in Honor of George Cardona (review)". Language. 90283 (4): 902–904. doi:10.1353/lan.2006.0206. S2CID 143525202.
- Kiparsky, Paul (1991). "On Pāṇinian Studies: A Reply to Cardona". Journal of Indian Philosophy. 19 (4): 331–367. doi:10.1007/bf00196003. S2CID 170279171.
