= Donald Stadtner =

American art historian

Donald M. Stadtner
- Born: c. 1947 (age 78–79)
- Spouse: Kwanchai Channoo

Academic background
- Education: University of California, Berkeley

Academic work
- Discipline: Art history, South Asian art, Buddhist studies
- Institutions: University of Texas at Austin
- Notable works: Sacred Sites of Burma; Ancient Pagan: Buddhist Plain of Merit

Donald Martin Stadtner is an American art historian known for his publications on South and Southeast Asian art. After completing his Ph.D. in the 1970s, he became a professor at the University of Texas in Austin and made multiple trips to Asian countries including India, Myanmar, and Japan focused on their art history and religious iconography. His research has frequently discussed Buddhist imagery and temples throughout the region. He has organized several exhibits in United States museums and other functions to showcase pieces and photos of his research, along with published books and art catalogues on the subject.

== Education and career ==
Stadtner completed his Ph.D. in art history from the University of California at Berkeley in 1976 with a thesis titled From Sirpur to Rājim: The Art of Kosala During the Seventh Century. He went on to become an assistant professor at the University of Texas in Austin that same year and later an associate professor. The countries his research covered caused Stadtner to be referred to as an "Oriental art specialist" by the Abilene Reporter-News. His early research was on the art of India, including temples and art connected to Buddhist traditions. In 1979, he went on a trip to India and Japan through a Fulbright Grant to continue his studies before returning to the University of Texas to teach in the 1980 fall term. His time in India was spent in Varanasi to study medieval Indian art. Stadtner was elected in 1982 to the art and archaeology committee for the American Institute of Indian Studies to help support the Center for Art and Archaeology.

Throughout the early 1980s, he focused on art in Japan, particularly on the work of Hokusai. After finishing his study of the artist's portfolio, he returned to the United States to do a lecture and exhibition tour throughout Texas on Japanese art in 1985, funded by the University of New Mexico and the Texas Arts Exchange. The summer of 1985, after obtaining a Smithsonian Institution grant, he spent several weeks in India and Burma to begin an archaeological investigation of ancient Burmese religious temples for both Hinduism and Buddhism in the area around Rangoon.

Collaborating with Sylvia Fraser-Lu in 2015, Stadtner organized an exhibit titled "Buddhist Art of Myanmar" at the Asia Society museum headquarters in New York City. They worked with the curator, Adriana Proser, to showcase different aspects of the Buddha throughout many periods of Myanmar's history with collection pieces loaned from Myanmar museums and various US organizations.

== Publications ==
Stadtner has published several books and numerous articles in peer-reviewed journals and co-authored two museum catalogues.

- — (1971). A Gupta Lintel from Sārnāth: Masters Paper. University of Michigan Press.
- — (1976). From Sirpur to Rājim: The Art of Kosala During the Seventh Century. University of California Press. p. 788.
- —; Girard-Geslan, Maud; Klokke, Marijke J.; Le Bonheur, Albert; Zaleski, Valerie; Zephir, Thierry (1998). Art of Southeast Asia. Harry N. Abrams, Incorporated. p. 635. ISBN 9780810919952.
- — (1999). The Art of Burma: New Studies. Marg Publications. p. 128. ISBN 9788185026442.
- — (2005). Ancient Pagan: Buddhist Plain of Merit. River Books. p. 286. ISBN 9786167339320.
- —; Pīammēttāwat, Phaisān (2011). Sacred Sites of Burma: Myth and Folklore in an Evolving Spiritual Realm. River Books. p. 348. ISBN 9789749863602.
- —; Fraser-Lu, Sylvia (2015). Buddhist Art of Myanmar. Asia Society Museum. p. 256. ISBN 9780300209457.
- —; Brown, Robert L.; Gude, Tushara Bindu; Gamage, Lakshika Senarath (2018). The Jeweled Isle: Art from Sri Lanka. Los Angeles County Museum of Art. p. 106. ISBN 9781943042128.
- — (2026). Sacred Sites of Sri Lanka. River Books. p. 324. ISBN 9786164510227.

== Personal life ==
Stadtner lives in Walnut Creek, California.

== See also ==
- Arts and entertainment in India
- Southeast Asian arts
