= Brahma Vaivarta Purana =

Sanskrit scripture, One of major eighteen Puranas

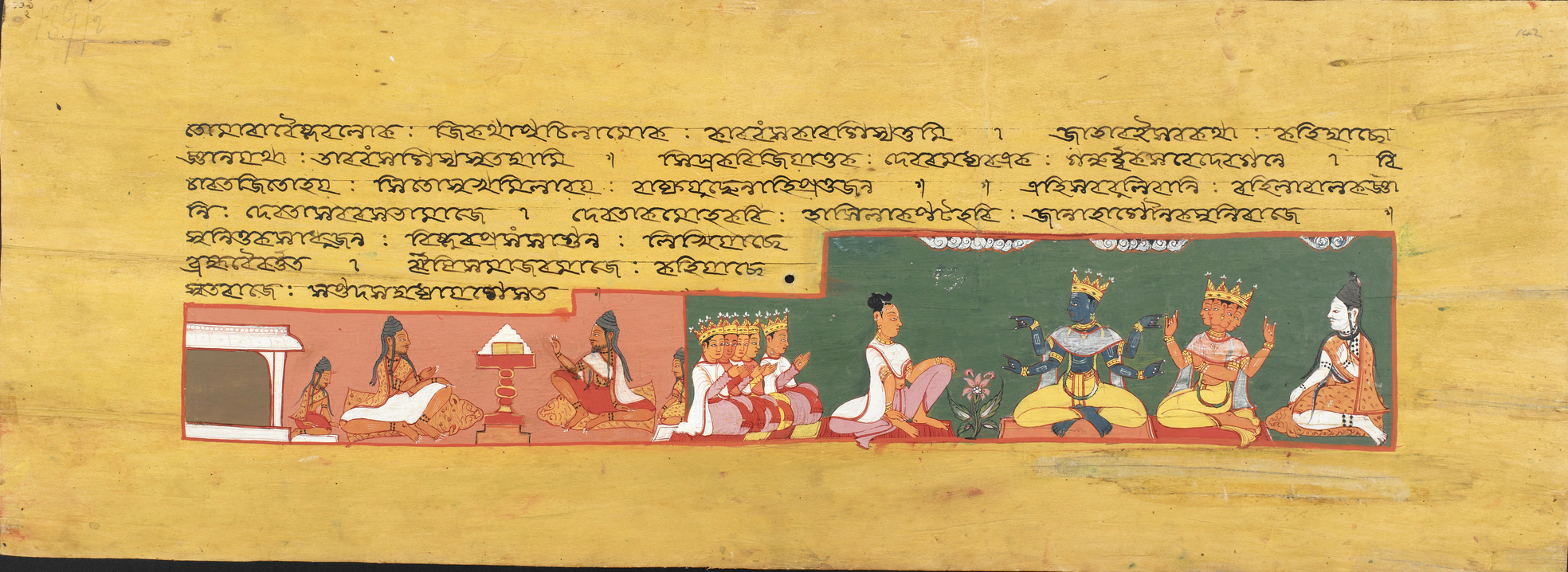
- A manuscript of the Brahma Vaivarta Purana

Information
- Religion: Hinduism
- Author: Vyasa
- Language: Sanskrit
- Period: 15th-16th century CE
- Chapters: 276
- Verses: 18,000

The Brahmavaivarta Purana (Sanskrit: ब्रह्मवैवर्त पुराण; Brahmavaivarta Purāṇa) is a voluminous Sanskrit text and one of the major Puranas (Maha-purana) of Hinduism. It is an important Vaishnava text. This Purana majorly centers around the Hindu deities Radha and Krishna.

Although a version may have existed in late 1st millennium CE, its extant version was likely composed in the Bengal region of Indian subcontinent in 15th–16th century. Later, it was likely revised somewhere in South India. Numerous versions of this Purana exist and are claimed to be the part of manuscripts of the Brahmavaivarta Purana or the Brahmakaivarta Purana.

The text is notable for identifying Krishna as the supreme reality and asserting that all gods such as Vishnu, Shiva, Brahma, Ganesha are one and the same and in fact, all are the incarnations of Krishna. Goddesses like Radha, Durga, Lakshmi, Saraswati and Savitri are asserted to be equivalent and are mentioned as the incarnations of Prakruti in this text, with legends similar to those found in the Devi-Bhagavata Purana and the Devi Mahatmya. The text is also notable for glorifying the feminine aspect of god through Radha and its egalitarian views that all women are manifestations of the divine female, co-creators of the universe, and that any insult to a woman is an insult to goddess Radha.

The mythology and stories of Brahmavaivarta Purana, along with Bhagavata Purana, have been influential to the Krishna-related Hindu traditions, as well as to dance and performance arts such as the Rasa Lila.

In this Purāna, Radha (or Rādhikā), who is inseparable from Krishna, appears as the main goddess. She is the personification of the mūlaprakriti, the "root nature", that original seed from which all material forms evolved. In the company of the Purusha ("Man", "Spirit", "Universal soul") Krishna, she is said to inhabit the Goloka, which is a world of cows and cowherds far above the Vishnu's Vaikuntha. In this divine world, Krishna and Radha relate to one another in the way body relates to soul. (4.6.216)

== History ==
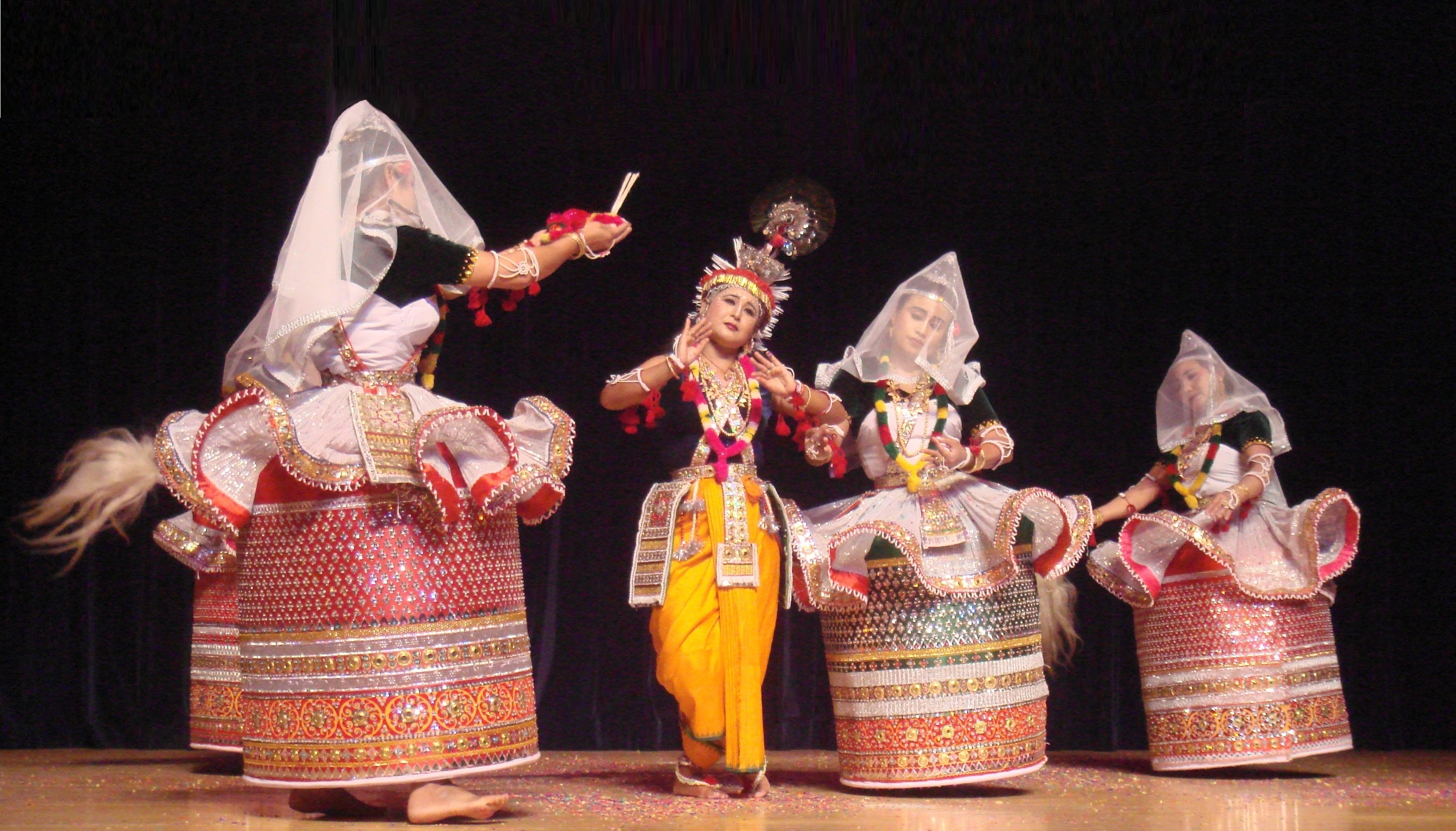
The Brahmavaivarta Purana, along with Bhagavata Purana, have influenced performance arts and cultural celebrations in India, such as with Rasa Lila in Manipur above.

This text is mostly legends, worship, mythology and drama during the life of Radha and Krishna, with discussion of ethics, dharma, four stages of life and festivals embedded as part of the plot. The specific details in this Purana show the influence or knowledge of events traced to mid 2nd-millennium CE developments associated with Tantra and Bhakti saints such as Chaitanya and others. This text is unlike the encyclopedic style found in almost all other major Puranas, and for these reasons, predominant portions of this Purana are likely to be a 15th or 16th century composition.

The text very likely existed much earlier, and the older version likely was complete in the 8th to 10th century period. A version probably existed by 700 CE, adds Hazra. However, in its history, this Hindu text also underwent major revisions, over the centuries. This text was likely revised in the Bengal region of South Asia. Another related text, called Brahmakaivarta Purana, also relatively modern but traced to South India, exists in many versions. There are a few manuscripts titled Adi brahmavaivarta purana, of unclear date of composition, proposed as the older possibly original Purana, but these are very different from the Brahmavaivarta Purana text generally considered one of the 18 Mahapuranas.

The older version of the Brahmavaivarta Purana was once influential in its own way, because Nibandha authors of 15th and 16th century quoted nearly 1,500 lines in texts such as the Smriti Candrika, which they claimed is in this Purana. However, only 30 of these lines are found in the extant manuscripts of Brahmavaivarta Purana suggesting massive rewrite of the original Purana over its history, in or after the 15th or 16th century.

The text includes Smriti chapters that, states Hazra, were likely inserted into the text after the 16th century. This modern content includes chapters on "mixed castes, duties of women, duties of varna, duties of individuals during their ashrama (stages of life), worship and glorification of Brahmins, theory of hell in after-life, and religious gift giving for merit". The only Smriti chapters in currently surviving manuscripts, that can be found in older versions of this text are two, namely 4.8 and 4.26. These relate to vrata. (Note: A vrata is a personal ritual of making religious vow or resolve, sometimes with fasting or in presence of loved ones.)

== Structure ==
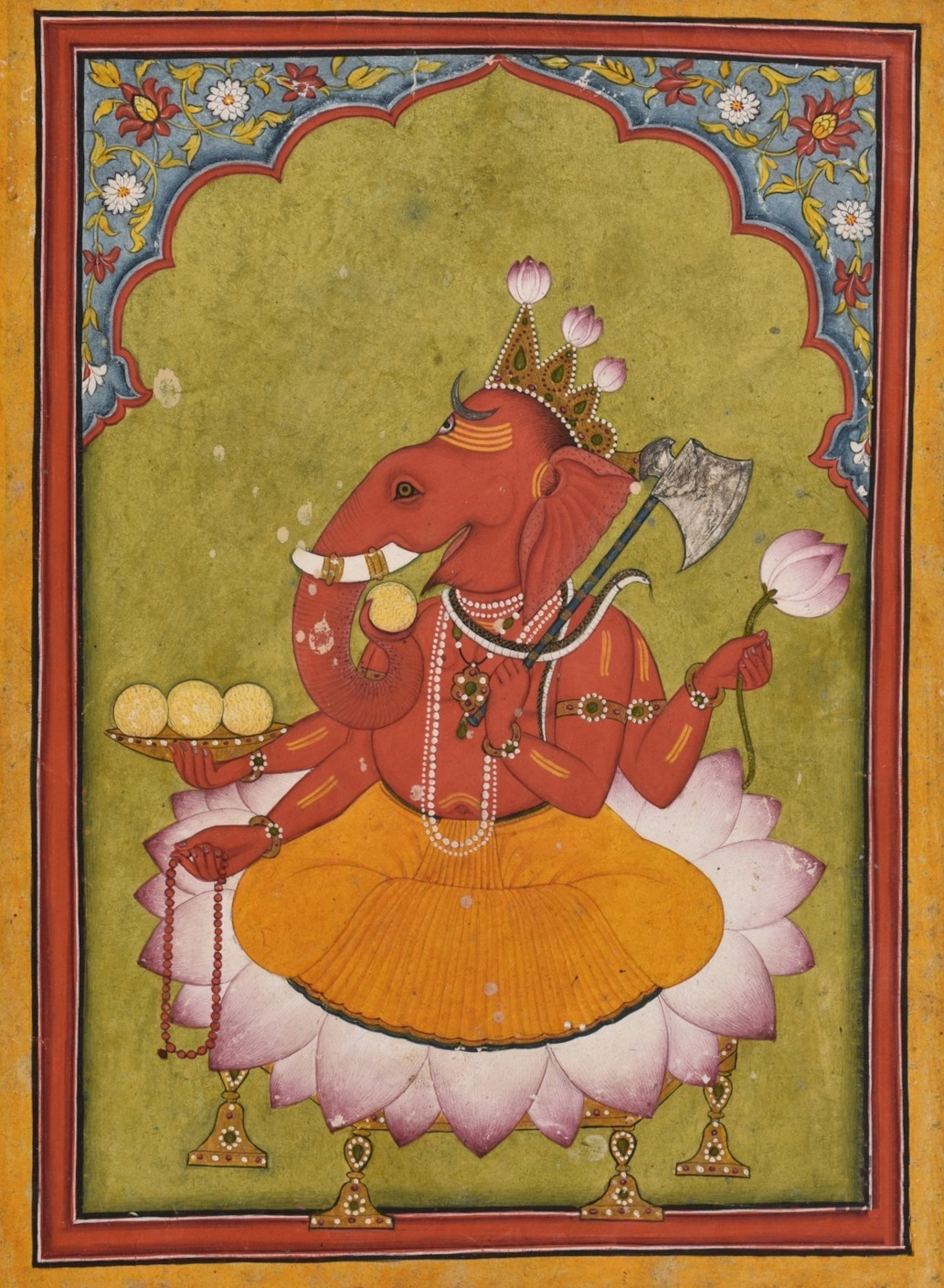
The third Khanda centers on Ganesha

The text has four Khandas (parts).

Sections in Brahmavaivarta Purana
| Khanda | Number | Chapters | About |
| Brahma | 1 | 30 | Brahman |
| Prakriti | 2 | 67 | Devi |
| Ganesha | 3 | 46 | Ganesha |
| Krishna | 4 | 131 to 133 | Radha Krishna |
| Total | | 274 to 276 | Krishna |

The third khanda is called either Ganesha-khanda or Ganapati-khanda.

The tradition and other Puranas assert that this Purana had 18,000 verses. The actual manuscripts have more than 18,000 verses, unlike other Puranas where they usually fall short.

The Padma Purana categorizes Brahma Vaivarta Purana as a Rajas Purana. Sanskrit scholar Ludo Rocher considers the Sattva-Rajas-Tamas classification as "entirely fanciful" and argues there is nothing in this text that actually justifies this classification.

== Content ==
Weapons of the love god

I give you the following weapons:
Enchanting,
Stupefying,
Maddening,
Fever-producing, and
Sense-depriving.
Please accept these and bewilder everybody.
With these, you will be irresistible.

— Brahma to Kama
Brahmavaivarta Purana, Chapter 4.35

The text's title Brahmavaivarta means "metamorphosis of Brahman", who is identified with Krishna. This Purana takes a view on the creation where the Brahman as Krishna creates the universe and is the universe. The evolution and the nature of the universe is presented through the legend of Radha and Krishna in this Purana. The seduction stories and legends of this text have attracted many scholarly studies.

The first khanda (part) presents the theme that Krishna is the primordial creator, universal soul and supreme reality concept called Brahman. The second part presents Prakriti or matter, which through mythology is equated to five goddesses – Radha, Durga, Lakshmi, Saraswati and Savitri. However, many other goddesses are introduced, but ultimately every goddess and feminine is asserted to be the same essence of Radha (Prakriti). The third part presents Ganesha, the highly popular elephant headed god, his life story along with that of his family and brother, and he is asserted to be an incarnation of Krishna as well. The last part of this Purana is all about Radha and Krishna, painted with erotic themes, hymns, legends and mythology. Radha and Krishna are presented as inseparable, and Radha is described as the energy and power (shakti) of Krishna.

The Purana presents an egalitarian view towards women, wherein it asserts ideas such as, "all female beings have come forth out of the divine female" in chapter 4.13, and that "every insult to a woman is an offence against divine Rädhä" in Prakrti-khanda. Along with equating all women with goddess Radha, the text equates all men with Krishna. These sections may be from possible influences of the ancient Shaktism tradition of Hinduism.

== Reception ==
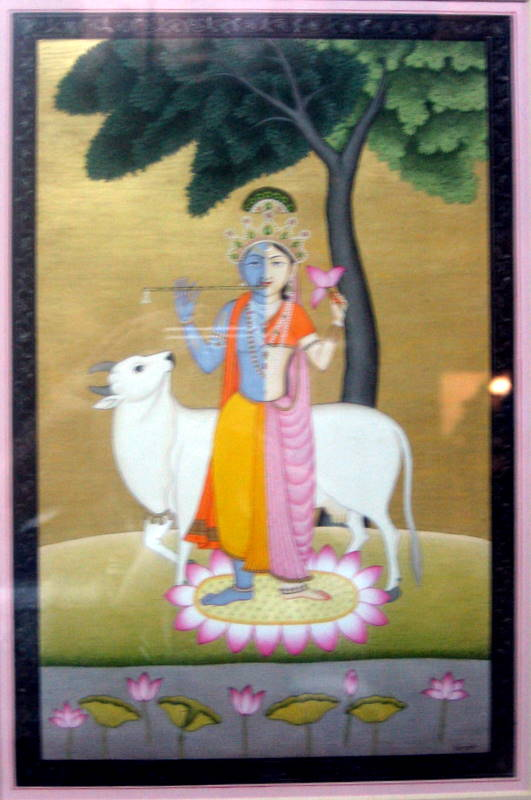
Ardhanarishvara form of Radha Krishna

The Brahmavaivarta Purana focuses on Vishnu and in particular Krishna like the Bhagavata Purana, but its stories and legends have been far less popular than the Bhagavata text. Its style has been called "insipid, puerile", and its content and layout of a form so different from the other Puranas that Wilson wrote, "the Brahmavaivarta Purana has not the slightest title to be regarded as a Purana".

In contrast to Wilson's views, Parmeshwaranand states that this is a bhakti text oriented towards a mystical experience, and that this text, in its own way, tries to discuss religious and philosophical questions as in other religious works, such as duality and non-duality between God and the world.

The Brahmavaivarta Purana emphasizes the unity, interdependence and inseparability of the feminine and the masculine, through Radha and Krishna, across its various chapters, and through the concept of Ardhanari-Krishna (also called Ardha-radha-venudhara-murti), a concept similar to Ardhanarishvara in Shaivism. This idea of Purana has been traced to an art work found in Maharashtra where a Krishna murti is sculpted as half man and half woman.

The first part, Brahma-khanda of the Brahmavaivarta Purana was translated into Assamese, and this manuscript has been dated to the early 19th century.

The text is part of the Vaishnavism literature in Bengal, but is not considered a canonical scripture, states Edward Dimock.

== Bibliography ==
- Barnett, L.D. (1933). "Two Illustrated Assamese Manuscripts". The British Museum Quarterly. 8 (1): 10–12. doi:10.2307/4421514. JSTOR 4421514.
- Brown, Cheever Mackenzie (1974). God as Mother: A Feminine Theology in India : an Historical and Theological Study of the Brahmavaivarta Purāna. C. Stark. ISBN 978-0-89007-004-8.
- Dalal, Rosen (2014). Hinduism: An Alphabetical Guide. Penguin. ISBN 978-8184752779.
- Dimitrova, Diana; Oranskaia, Tatiana, eds. (14 June 2018). Divinizing in South Asian Traditions. Routledge. ISBN 978-1-351-12360-0.
- Dimock, Edward C. Jr. (1963). "Doctrine and Practice among the Vaiṣṇavas of Bengal". History of Religions. 3 (1): 106–127. doi:10.1086/462474. JSTOR 1062079. S2CID 162027021.
- Gielen, Joris (2008). "The Theological Bearing of Puranic Stories: An enquiry into the presence of feminine theology in the Brahmavaivarta Purana". Religions of South Asia. 2 (2). doi:10.1558/rosa.v2i2.177.
- Gietz, K.P.; et al. (1992). Epic and Puranic Bibliography (Up to 1985) Annotated and with Indexes: Part I: A - R, Part II: S - Z, Indexes. Otto Harrassowitz Verlag. ISBN 978-3-447-03028-1.
- Hazra, Rajendra Chandra (1987) [1940]. Studies in the Puranic Records on Hindu Rites and Customs. Motilal Banarsidass. ISBN 978-81-208-0422-7.
- Kinsley, David R. (1979). The Divine Player: A Study of Kṛṣṇa Līlā. Motilal Banarsidass. ISBN 978-0-89684-019-5.
- Monier-Williams, Monier, Sir (1992). A Sanskrit-English Dictionary: Etymologically and Philologically Arranged with Special Reference to Cognate Indo-European Languages (4 ed.). Delhi: Motilal Banarsidass. ISBN 9788120804548.
- Parmeshwaranand, S.W. (2001). Encyclopaedic Dictionary of Puranas. Vol. 1. Sarup & Sons. ISBN 978-81-7625-226-3.
- Pradhan, Shrikant (2008). "A unique image of Ardharadhavenudharamurti or Ardhanari Krishna". Bulletin of the Deccan College Research Institute. 68/69: 207–213. JSTOR 42931207.
- Richmond, Farley P.; Swann, Darius L.; Zarrilli, Phillip B. (1993). Indian Theatre: Traditions of Performance. Motilal Banarsidass. ISBN 978-81-208-0981-9.
- Rocher, Ludo (1986). The Purāṇas. Wiesbaden: Otto Harrassowitz Verlag. ISBN 3-447-02522-0.
- Wilson, H.H. (1864). Puranas. Read Books. ISBN 1-84664-664-2.
- Winternitz, M. (1927). A History of Indian Literature. Vol. 1. Translated by Ketkar, S. University of Calcutta.
