= W. Norman Brown =

William Norman Brown (June 24, 1892 – April 22, 1975) was an American Indologist and Sanskritist who established the first academic department of South Asian Studies in North America and organized the American Oriental Society in 1926. He was the Professor of Sanskrit at the University of Pennsylvania for most of his academic career. He was president of the Association for Asian Studies in 1960. He is considered the founder of the field of South Asian Studies, which he pioneered in his career over four decades at the University of Pennsylvania, where he helped to found the Department of Oriental Studies (1931), and later single-handedly founded the Department of South Asia Regional Studies (1948). These departments are now survived by the departments of East Asian Languages and Civilizations, Near Eastern Languages and Civilizations, and South Asia Studies. Brown also founded the American Institute of Indian Studies, which was located in the Van Pelt Library at the University of Pennsylvania. He was elected to the American Philosophical Society in 1946.

== Early life ==
W. Norman Brown was born in Baltimore on June 24, 1892, and went to India at the age of eight, as the son of missionary parents. He was sent to a boarding school in Hiram, Ohio, when he was thirteen. His parents came back to the United States in 1910 and Brown and his father both studied at Johns Hopkins University, as an undergraduate and graduate student respectively. His father, George W. Brown, earned a PhD with a thesis on The Human Body in the Upanishads and W. Norman Brown obtained a BA in Greek. He then studied with the Vedic scholar Maurice Bloomfield, and received his PhD in 1916. His doctoral dissertation was published in part in the Journal of the American Oriental Society in 1919, and demonstrated his diachronic interest in South Asia. From 1916 to 1919 he was a post-doctoral fellow at the University of Pennsylvania, and then returned to Johns Hopkins as the Johnston scholar in Sanskrit. He traveled to India in 1922, first to Varanasi for research, and then to Jammu where he became the professor of English and Vice-Principal at the Prince of Wales College.

== Early career ==
The University of Pennsylvania was one of the first American academic institutions to offer courses in Sanskrit; already during the 1880s, the university offered a major and a minor in Sanskrit. Prof. Morton W. Easton (Professor of Comparative Philology, 1883–1912), taught Sanskrit courses at the University of Pennsylvania. Easton retired in 1912 and was replaced the following year by Franklin Edgerton (Professor, 1913–1926). Edgerton would eventually be replaced by Brown, who was then teaching Sanskrit at the Prince of Wales College in Jammu. From 1916 to 1919, Brown had held the position of the Harrison Research Fellow at the University of Pennsylvania. He organized the American Oriental Society in 1926. After Edgerton left in 1926, W. Norman Brown was appointed in his place. Along with several specialists of the Near East, Brown founded the Department of Oriental Studies in 1931 at the University of Pennsylvania, after having played a key role in the discussions sponsored by the Committee on Indic and Iranian Studies of the American Council of Learned Societies. Though himself a Sanskritist, Brown was a polymath, and was interested in several ventures, including excavations at the Indus site of Chanhudaro for which he enabled funds in 1935–1936. It was during this time that he became interested in manuscripts, particularly the early western style. His interest in art extended to architecture, sculpture and other artifacts. He also served as the Curator for Indian Art at the Philadelphia Museum of Art from 1931 to 1954, and supervised the permanent installation of a pillared hall from Madurai. In this period, Brown also arranged for the collection of manuscripts from South Asia, ensuring that the South Asia Collection at the University of Pennsylvania Libraries had the largest collection of Indic manuscripts in North America, and one of the largest in the western hemisphere. The history of the manuscripts has been narrated in many publications, and can be summarized thus: "Some of the manuscripts had been acquired in chance fashion by the Library and the University Museum before 1930, but in that year, at the request of Professor W. Norman Brown (1892–1975), Provost Josiah Penniman provided a sum of money to purchase Indic manuscripts. Shortly thereafter he obtained a donation from the late Mr. John Gribbel. Substantial contributions from Dr. Charles W. Burr, the Faculty Research Fund, and the Cotton Fund soon followed. The bulk of the manuscripts are the result of purchases made using these funds in India, between 1930 and 1935, under the direction of Professor W. Norman Brown." He served as President of the American Oriental Society in 1941–1942, and was the editor of the Journal of the American Oriental Society from 1926 to 1941.

== Department of South Asia Regional Studies ==
The Second World War made the United States aware that there was a dearth of personnel trained in South Asian languages and culture, and contemporary South Asia at large. The University of Pennsylvania was the only institution with courses of intensive language and area study training during the war, and therefore it was at the University of Pennsylvania that South Asia Studies was born. In 1944, Brown had advocated for the serious development and funding of Oriental Studies in a draft document in which he wrote: "During the course of the war the US govt. agencies have needed information about the Orient to a degree far beyond anticipation...Our nation must never be caught so ill-equipped with knowledge and specialists on the Orient as it was at the end of 1941. The postwar Orient will also probably be freer than before to engage in trade with the Occident...To meet this new situation America will need to acquire information and develop personnel able to handle the increased political, business, and cultural relations." Soon after, Brown argued for the development of a more bounded program of South Asia Regional Studies, with the announcement of the independence of India and the creation of Pakistan in 1947. By the summer of 1947 Brown's summer program, "India: A Program of Regional Studies" was being offered at Penn. Through this period, helping W. Norman Brown was Ernest Bender, a brilliant student of linguistics who was enrolled in the Department of Oriental Studies. From 1943 to 1944, Bender was the instructor of Hindi and Urdu in the Army Specialized Training Program, and the co-ordinated the Army Specialized Training Program in Japanese for two years following that. Bender also authored scholarly essays on the Cherokee language while working on Asia. Through his career at Penn, Prof. W. Norman Brown continued to attract and place good students, scholars and faculty members, making the University of Pennsylvania one of the best venues for the study of classical and contemporary South Asia. Prof. Richard Lambert, Prof. Ludo Rocher, Prof. Franklin Southworth, Prof. George Cardona, and several others were recruited and placed by W. Norman Brown in various departments such as Oriental Studies, South Asia Regional Studies, and Linguistics. For example, Mark Jan Dresden, who had studied Vedic Sanskrit under Jan Gonda, and was reading Khotanese and Middle Iranian languages under H. W. Bailey and W. B. Henning at Cambridge, met W. Norman Brown in 1948. Brown immediately invited Dresden to the University of Pennsylvania, where he taught Persian, then various Old and Middle Iranian languages from 1949 until his retirement in 1977. Brown also invited Stella Kramrisch to join the Department of South Asia Regional Studies in 1953, where she was a professor till her death in 1993. For short terms, eminent scholars such as Suniti Kumar Chatterjee and Irawati Karve taught in the department. In 1961, Brown was awarded the title of Jnanaratnakara (ज्ञानरत्नाकरः) from the West Bengal Government Sanskrit College, Calcutta. He established the American Institute of Indian Studies in his offices attached to the South Asia Reading Room in Van Pelt Library at the University of Pennsylvania. Upon his death, his personal library was absorbed into the South Asia Collection at the University of Pennsylvania Libraries.

== Scholarship ==
W. Norman Brown published for over five decades, and his scholarly output is enormous. A list of his publications till 1962 appeared in the Indological Studies in Honor of W. Norman Brown edited by Ernest Bender and later in India and Indology: Selected Articles by W. Norman Brown edited by Rosane Rocher. He translated the Saundaryalahari, which is traditionally ascribed to Sankaracarya, published as volume 43 of the Harvard Oriental Series in 1958.

== Select bibliography ==
=== Books ===
- Brown, Norman W. (1978). Rocher, Rosane (ed.). India and Indology. Delhi: American Institute of Indian Studies.
- Brown, W. Norman (1964). The Mahimnastava: Praise of Shiva's greatness. Delhi: Motilal Banarasidass.
- Brown, W. Norman (1964). India, Pakistan, Ceylon (Rev. ed.). Philadelphia: University of Pennsylvania Press.
- Brown, W. Norman (1963). The United States and India and Pakistan. Cambridge: Harvard University Press.
- Brown, W. Norman (1962). The Vasanta vilasa a poem of the spring festival in Old Gujarati accompanied by Sanskrit and Prakrit stanzas and illustrated with miniature paintings. New Haven: American Oriental Society.
- Brown, W. Norman, ed. (1960). Resources for South Asian language studies in the United States: report of a conference convened by the University of Pennsylvania for the United States Office of Education, January 15–16, 1960. Philadelphia: University of Pennsylvania Press.
- Brown, Norman (1958). The Saundaryalahari: Flood of beauty. Cambridge: Harvard University Press.
- Brown, W. Norman (1953). The United States and India and Pakistan. Cambridge: Harvard University Press.
- Brown, W. Norman (1950). India, Pakistan, Ceylon. Ithaca: Cornell University Press.
- Brown, W. Norman (1941). Manuscript illustrations of the Uttaradhyayana sutra. New Haven: American Oriental Society.
- Brown, W. Norman (1940). A pillared hall from a temple at Madura, India in the Philadelphia Museum of Art. Philadelphia; London: University of Pennsylvania Press; Oxford University Press.
- Brown, W. Norman (1934). A descriptive and illustrated catalogue of miniature paintings of the Jaina Kalpasūtra as executed in the early western Indian style (with 45 plates). Baltimore: The Lord Baltimore Press.
- Brown, W. Norman (1933). The swastika : a study of the Nazi claims of its Aryan origin. New York: Emerson Books.
- Brown, W. Norman (1933). The story of Kalaka: texts, history, legends, and miniature paintings of the Śvetāmbara Jain hagiographical work, the Kālakācāryakathā (With 15 plates). Baltimore: The Lord Baltimore Press. "Freer Gallery of Art, Oriental Series no. 1"
- Brown, W. Norman (1926). Johns Hopkins half-century directory : a catalogue of the trustees, faculty, holders of honorary degrees, and students, graduates and non-graduates, 1876–1926. The Johns Hopkins University.
- Brown, W. Norman (1919). The Pancatantra in Modern Indian Folklore. New Haven: American Oriental Society.

=== Works online ===
- "Modern Indian folklore and its relation to literature. Part I: The Pañcatantra in modern Indian folklore (PhD thesis)". Baltimore. 1916.
- "The Indian and Christian miracles of walking on the water". 1928.
- The swastika: a study of the Nazi claims of its Aryan origin. New York: Emerson Books. 1933.
