= Edward Dimock =

Edward Dimock may refer to:

- Edward C. Dimock, American author, linguist, scholar of Asian studies
- Edward Jordan Dimock, American judge
