= Radhika Govindrajan =

Indian-American anthropologist and professor

- Citizenship: American
- Education: Jawaharlal Nehru University; Yale University
- Occupations: anthropologist, professor
- Known for: Animal Intimacies

Radhika Govindrajan is an Indian-American anthropologist, researcher and university professor. She has done research on animal studies especially about leopards, elephants. She is currently serving as an assistant associate professor at the University of Washington. She is well known for her book Animal Intimacies which is about an ethnography of multispecies relatedness in the Central Himalayan state of Uttarakhand.

== Career ==
She obtained her MA degree in history from the Jawaharlal Nehru University in 2006 and received her Ph.D in Anthropology from the Yale University in 2013. After completing her higher studies at the Yale University, she became a lecturer at the University of Illinois before moving to the University of Washington. She became the assistant associate professor in anthropology at the University of Washington in 2015.

She also wrote and published books related to animal studies and wrote an award-winning book titled Animal Intimacies: Interspecies Relations in India's Central Himalayas. The book which was set in the backdrop of Central Himalayas, talks and explores about the human-animal relationships. The book was officially published by the University of Chicago Press in May 2018. Radhika also received the Edward Cameron Dimock Prize from the American Institute of Indian Studies for her work in Animal Intimacies: Interspecies Relations in India's Central Himalayas and was also awarded the Gregory Bateson Prize in 2019.

In June 2020, she was included as one of the cohort of fellows for the year 2020 by the American Council of Learned Societies.
