= The Button (sculpture) =

Modern art sculpture by Claes Oldenburg

- The Split Button
- Artist: Claes Oldenburg
- Year: 1981
- Type: Sculpture
- Dimensions: 4.9 m diameter (16 ft)
- Location: 39.95222°N 75.19369°W

The Button (officially, Split Button) is a modern art sculpture that lies at the center of campus at the University of Pennsylvania. It was designed by Swedish sculptor Claes Oldenburg, who specialized in creating oversize sculptures of everyday objects.

== Specifications ==
- Total cost: $100,000 including transportation and installation ($37,500 from University, $37,500 from the National Endowment for the Arts, and $25,000 in contributions raised by Mrs. H. Gates Lloyd, chair of the Visual Environment Committee that chose the piece.)
- Weight: 5000 lb (approx. 2,270 kg)
- Materials: Reinforced aluminum
- Size: 16 ft (4.89 m) diameter

== Controversy ==
When The Button was installed in front of the Van Pelt Library on June 18, 1981, it was met with much controversy. Some students found the structure intrusive, and a poor addition to College Green. Controversy surrounding the piece has subsided in the years since 1981, but either way, it is now a central landmark and focal point of campus.

== In popular culture ==
In The Simpsons, The Button can be seen on the college green of fictional Springfield University as Homer performs in a Nirvana-like band in the 2008 episode "That 90's Show".

== Legend ==
A legend exists, mainly circulated by students at the University of Pennsylvania, that attributes The Button to the university's founder, Benjamin Franklin. A monument of a seated Franklin stands near the sculpture; legend has it that when this man of considerable girth sat down, his vest button popped off and rolled across the university's Locust Walk. It eventually came to a stop and split into two—hence becoming today's sculpture.

Oldenburg, however, presents an alternative view. He once said "The Split represents the Schuylkill. It divides the button into four parts—for William Penn's original Philadelphia squares."

== Student life ==
The Button lends its name to a Penn satire blog, Under the Button.

== See also ==
- List of public art in Philadelphia
