= Holden Furber =

American historian

Holden Furber (13 March 1903 – 19 January 1993) was a professor of South Asia Studies at the University of Pennsylvania from 1952 till 1973. He was the twenty-first president of the Association for Asian Studies and a scholar who specialized in the history of India during the time of the British Raj.

== Biography ==
Born in Boston, Massachusetts in 1903, Furber was almost entirely educated in the Boston area, where he attended Brookline High School before graduating from Harvard University in 1924. He received his doctorate from Harvard in 1929 and at the same time attended Oxford University, where he completed a bachelor's degree in 1925 and a master's degree in 1930. In 1931, during his nine-year career as a lecturer at Harvard, he published his first book, Henry Dundas, First Viscount Melville, followed within two years by his edition of The Correspondence of Sir John Shore, Governor General, with Henry Dundas, President of the Board of Control, 1793–1798. Furber's potential as a young scholar was identified with the awarding of a Guggenheim Fellowship in 1937–1938. He was appointed to the post of assistant professor at the University of Texas in 1940 but soon received an assignment to the Office of Strategic Services (which later became the CIA) to work as a social science analyst after the United States entered the Second World War. From 1943 to 1945, Furber served the US State Department as a specialist on the British Commonwealth, before returning to the University of Texas, where he stayed until 1948.

It was at that point that Furber published what was regarded as his most creative book, John Company at Work. For this study of the country trade in Asia, European trade from one point in Asia to another, Furber pored through Dutch, French, and Danish, as well as British archives. He concluded that private British trading interests combined with Indian merchants to play a dynamic role in a network of trade which ultimately led to the establishment of the British Raj in India. The American Historical Association recognised the book with the Watumull Prize in 1949. In the meantime, Furber lectured at the University of Madras in 1948, before moving to the University of Pennsylvania, where he served as Professor of History until 1973. It was at Pennsylvania that he formed a close working relationship with W. Norman Brown and significantly contributed to the building of a program for studying the Indian subcontinent. He traveled to India in 1962 to deliver the Heras Lectures at the University of Bombay, which were published under the title The Bombay Presidency in the Mid-18th Century. In 1965 co-edited the fifth volume of the series entitled The Correspondence of Edmund Burke. This volume documented the period between July 1782 and June 1789 during which Burke's constructive interest in Indian affairs yielded to an "implacable determination" to defeat Hastings in the latter's impeachment trial. Furber interpreted these letters as re-enforcement for the "view held in India today" that Burke was a "champion of Bengal's downtrodden millions."

Furber was a member of the Royal Historical Society and was the president of the Association for Asian Studies from 1968 to 1969. In retirement, he published his ambitious survey, Rival Empires of Trade in the Orient 1600–1800, which applied the themes elucidated in John Company at Work back to earlier times. Furber's last book was dedicated to Elizabeth Chapin Furber, his first wife and a scholar of medieval French history, who died at the time of his retirement. His second wife Lucy Richardson was the classmate of a widow, whom he escorted to his 50th reunion at Harvard. They married seven years later and they periodically lived at his summer home at Marblehead, Massachusetts, and her family home in Concord, Massachusetts. He died during his sleep on January 19, 1993, in Bedford, Massachusetts.
