= Edward C. Dimock =

American scholar of Asian studies (1929-2001

- Born: Edward Cameron Dimock Jr. March 18, 1929; Roslindale, US
- Died: January 11, 2001 (aged 71); Centerville, Massachusetts, US
- Occupations: Emeritus professor, linguist, scholar
- Years active: 1959–1989
- Known for: Research on Asian studies
- Title: Emeritus professor
- Board member of: president of American Institute of Indian Studies
- Spouse: Lorraine
- Children: 5
- Awards: the Desikottama, Sahitya Akademi Fellowship

Academic background
- Education: Ph.D
- Alma mater: Yale University

Edward Cameron Dimock Jr. (March 18, 1929 – January 11, 2001) was an American author, linguist, scholar of Asian studies and emeritus professor at the University of Chicago. He is known for his contribution to Indian studies such as Bengali literature and South Asian civilizations. He also conducted research on religion in the mid-1950's and introduced Bengal studies to the American academy.

== Biography ==
=== Education ===
He was born on March 18, 1929, in Roslindale, Massachusetts. In 1946, he graduated from Roxbury Latin School. In 1954, he became an ordained minister after obtaining a Masters of Sacred Theology. In 1959, he went to Yale University and Harvard Divinity School where he obtained his Ph.D.

=== Career ===
He started his career as an assistant professor of linguistics and Asian languages at the faculty of the University of Chicago where he taught for 35 years. He played a central role at the Chicago University for introducing the department of South Asian languages and civilizations, for which he was promoted to the rank of professor in 1966. In the mid-1950's, he travelled to India along with his family to conduct research on religion. After traveling to India, he published several scholarly books, including Mr. Dimock Explores the Mysteries of the East (Algonquin, 1999), consisting a detailed account of his personal analysis and experiences in India.

His other scholarly publications include The Thief of Love: Bengali Tales from Court to Village, The Place of the Hidden Moon: Erotic Mysticism in the Vaisnava-Sahajiya Cult of Bengal, and The Caitanya-Caritamrta of Krsnadasa Kaviraja among others.

He served president of the American Institute of Indian Studies from 1972 to 1986. In 1962, he along with Milton Singer played significant role with the help of W. Norman Brown to establish Indian studies institute at the University of Pennsylvania which was later shifted to University of Chicago in 1972.

He retired in November 1993 and then moved to Centerville, Massachusetts, with his wife.

== Death ==
He died on January 11, 2001, from cancer. He is survived by two daughters, three sons and a brother, George of Harvard.

== Awards and honours ==
He received various literary awards over the course of his career, including the Desikottama, equivalent of a Doctorate honoris causa, by Visva Bharati University established by Rabindranath Tagore, in 1992 which was awarded him for his contribution to Bengali literature. He also received literary honour by the Sahitya Akademi and was elected to the Sahitya Akademi Fellowship from 1929-2001.

== Publications ==
- Dimock, E.C. (1999). Mr. Dimock Explores the Mysteries of the East: Journeys in India. Algonquin Books. ISBN 978-1-56512-153-9.
- Kavirāja, K.; Gosvāmi, K.K.; Dimock, E.C.; Stewart, T.K. (1999). Caitanya Caritāmṛta of Kṛṣṇadāsa Kavirāja: A Translation and Commentary. Harvard oriental series (in Latin). Department of Sanskrit and Indian Studies, Harvard University. ISBN 978-0-674-00285-2.
- Elder, J.W.; Dimock, E.C.; Embree, A.T.; American Institute of Indian Studies (1998). India's Worlds and U.S. Scholars, 1947-1997. Manohar Publishers & Distributors. ISBN 978-81-7304-235-5.
- Dimock, E.C. (1991). The Place of the Hidden Moon: Erotic Mysticism in the Vaiṣṇava-sahajiyā Cult of Bengal. Motilal Banarsidass Publishers Private Limited. ISBN 978-81-208-0996-3.
- Dimock, E.C. (1989). The Place of the Hidden Moon: Erotic Mysticism in the Vaisnava-Sahajiya Cult of Bengal. University of Chicago Press. ISBN 978-0-226-15237-0.
- Dimock, E.C. (1989). The Sound of Silent Guns and Other Essays. Oxford University Press. ISBN 978-0-19-562308-6.
- Dimock, E.C.; Bhattacharji, S.; Chatterjee, S. (1976). Introduction to Bengali: By Edward Dimock, Somdev Bhattacharji and Suhas Chatterjee. Manohar.
- Dimock, E.C.; Gerow, E. (1974). The Literatures of India: An Introduction. University of Chicago Press. ISBN 978-0-226-15232-5.
- Dimock, E.C.; Levertov, D. (1967). In Praise of Krishna: Songs from the Bengali; Translations by Edward C. Dimock, Jr. and Denise Levertov; with an Introd. and Notes by Edward C. Dimock, Jr.; Illustrations by Anju Chaudhuri. (Cape Editions). Doubleday.
- Dimock, E.C. (1966). Dimock, Edward C. University of Chicago Press.
- Dimock, E.C.; Bhattacharji, S.; Chatterjee, S. (1965). Introduction to Bengali: by Edward Dimock, Somdev Bhattacharji [and] Suhas Chatterjee. C&T Asian languages series (in Indonesian). South Asia Language and Area Center, University of Chicago.
- Dimock, E.C.; Gupta, P.C.; Association for Asian Studies (1965). The Maharashta Purana: An Eighteenth-century Bengali Historical Text. Translated, Annotated, and with an Introd. by Edward C. Dimock, Jr., and Pratul Chandra Gupta. Monographs of the Association for Asian studies 12. Association for Asian Studies.
- De, S.K.; Dimock, E.C.; Gerow, E. (1963). Sanskrit Poetics as a Study of Aesthetic. University of California Press. ISBN 978-0-520-33914-9.
- Dimock, E.C. (1963). Thief of Love: Bengali Tales from Court and Village. University of Chicago Press. ISBN 978-0-226-15235-6.
- Dimock, E.C. (1962). Manasha, Goddess of Snakes. Reprint series. University of Chicago, Committee on Southern Asian Studies.
- Dimock, E.C. (1959). Rabindranath Tagore: "the Greatest of the Bâuls of Bengal.". Reprint series. University of Chicago.
- Dimock, E.C.; Bhattacharji, S. A Bengali prose reader for second year students, by E.C.Dimock. publisher not identified.
- Dimock, E.C. Introduction to Bengali, by E. Dimock, S. Bhattacharji, S. Chatterjee. publisher not identified.
