= Ernest Bender =

American Indologist (1919–1996)

- Bender in Stockholm in 1987
- Born: January 2, 1919; Buenos Aires, Argentina
- Died: April 18, 1996 (aged 77); Newtown Square, Pennsylvania, U.S.

Academic work
- Discipline: Indologist
- Institutions: University of Pennsylvania

Ernest Bender (January 2, 1919 – April 18, 1996) was a Professor of Indo-Aryan languages and literature at the University of Pennsylvania.

Bender was born in Buenos Aires, Argentina, on January 2, 1919, before moving to Philadelphia, Pennsylvania, when he was aged four. He was admitted into the selective Greek and Latin program of Boys High School (Central High School), and graduated in 1937. Bender undertook his undergraduate studies at Temple University where he continued his studies in classics, firmly entrenching his lifelong interest in philology and cultural history. Upoon earning his B.A. in 1941, Bender became a graduate student in the Oriental Studies Department of the University of Pennsylvania. There he became acquainted with the three teachers who influenced him the most: W. Norman Brown in Indology, and Zellig Harris and Henry Hoenigswald in linguistics. Through Brown, Bender pursued a career in Indology, specializing in medieval Jainism and its associated literature and art.

Shortly after the United States declared war on Japan in the wake of the attack on Pearl Harbor in December 1941, Bender was drafted into the United States Air Force, but was discharged from active duty for medical reasons. Due to his talent and background in classical languages, Bender was given a grant from the American Council of Learned Societies to study Hindi and Urdu at the Asia Society in New York City. He then returned to Philadelphia, serving from 1943 to 1944 as an instructor of Hindi and Urdu in the Army Specialized Training Program. From 1944 until 1946, Bender coordinated the Army Specialized Training Program in Japanese. At the same time, Bender was awarded two consecutive Harrison fellowships at Pennsylvania for the study of Sanskrit. While studying Indology, Bender continued working with Harris on linguistics, coauthoring two articles on the Cherokee language. An unpublished manuscript of Cherokee texts, complete with translations and grammatical analysis is stored in the Boas Collection in the Library of the American Philosophical Society.

Bender was awarded a Rockefeller fellowship from 1947 to 1948, visiting India, Pakistan, and Sri Lanka. He was voracious photographer, copying many medieval manuscripts. His prolific archive of Jain materials was derived from this period. The Rockefeller grant also gave him the opportunity to work on the grammar of the Sinhalese language.

Upon his return to the United States, he was appointed to the newly created South Asia Regional Studies Department at the University of Pennsylvania. He became an assistant professor in 1950, in a joint appointment with the Oriental Studies Department. From 1955 to 1956, he returned to India and Sri Lanka on a Guggenheim fellowship to research the Old Gujarati. It was during this trip that he developed his grammars for Hindi and Urdu. He was elevated to associate professor with tenure in 1958, and became a professor in 1967.

In 1958, Bender began a three decade editorial relationship with the American Oriental Society; he began as associate editor and became the chief editor in 1964, a post he held until 1988. He served as the president of the AOS from 1993 to 1994. He served as the vice-president of the International Association of Sanskrit Studies, and convened the 6th World Sanskrit Conference in Philadelphia in 1984. He was a member of many scholarly societies beyond those in America, including the Royal Asiatic Society of Great Britain and Ireland; the L.D. Institute of Indology in Ahmedabad; the Asiatic Society of Bengal; the Bhandarkar Oriental Research Institute, Pune; and the Oriental Institute in Baroda.

Bender had a pivotal role in developing teaching methods for Indian subcontinental languages in the American graduate studies framework. During the World War II era and its immediate aftermath, when the discipline of linguistics began to gain acceptance, Bender participated in formulating teaching techniques for South Asian languages in the military system, US State Department staff, as well as graduate students. He authored ten monographs on linguistic or literary topics concerning Indian languages, and several articles, including art historical topics. He published grammars of Hindi, Urdu and Bengali language and completed, but did not publish grammars for Gujarati and Sinhalese. In 1992, he published a critical edition and translation of the Salibhadra-Dhanna-Carita, a medieval Jain didactic story composed in Old Gujarati. After retiring in 1989, he spent significant time compiling an etymological glossary of Old Gujarati. He died at his home, Newtown Square, Pennsylvania, on April 18, 1996, of a heart attack, aged 77 years old.
