= Van Pelt Library =

University library at the University of Pennsylvania

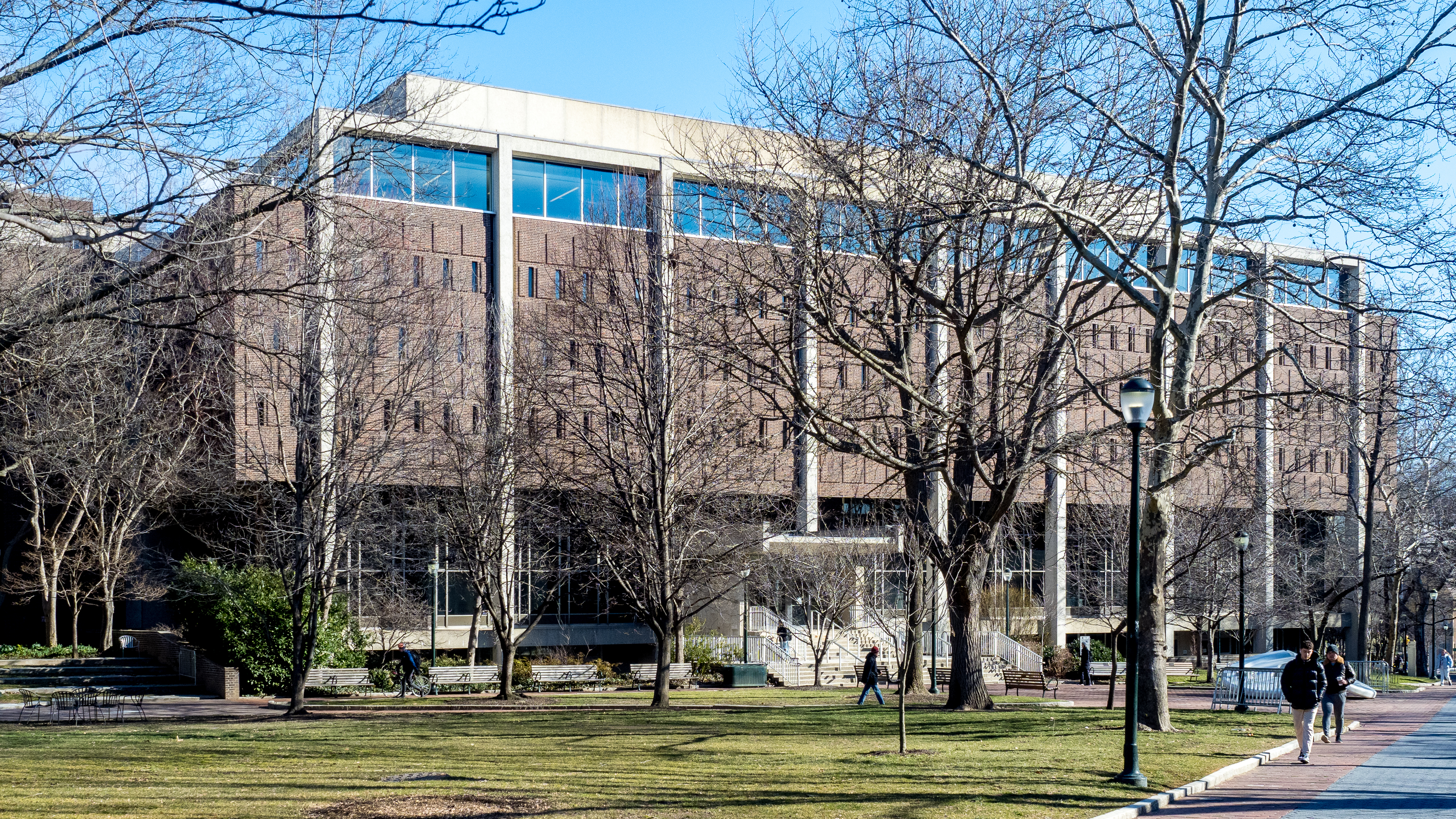
- Van Pelt Library at the University of Pennsylvania
- 39.9527°N 75.1936°W
- Location: 3420 Walnut Street, Philadelphia, Pennsylvania, U.S.
- Type: Academic library
- Established: 1962
- Architect: Harbeson, Hough, Livingston & Larson
- Service area: University of Pennsylvania

Other information
- Website: www.library.upenn.edu/vanpelt

The Charles Patterson Van Pelt Library, also known as the Van Pelt-Dietrich Library Center and Van Pelt, is the primary library at the University of Pennsylvania in Philadelphia.

The building was designed by architects Harbeson, Hough, Livingston & Larson, and built in 1962. It has a gross area of 201,215 square feet (18,693 m^{2}). In addition to being the primary library on campus for social sciences and humanities, it also houses the Lippincott Library of the Wharton School, the Ormandy Music Library, and the Kislak Center for Special Collections, Rare Books and Manuscripts.

Van Pelt Library houses strong Area Studies collections in African, Japanese, Latin American, Chinese, Middle East, South Asia, and Judaica and Ancient Near East Studies. The Henry Charles Lea Library is located on the 6th floor of Van Pelt Library. The library holds the Weigle Information Commons, located on the west side of the 1st floor.

Grecian with a massive colonnade, but screened by brick panels with small windows that resemble an old French library, the Van Pelt Library is a major presence on the campus. A large modern art sculpture, The Button, sits at its southern entrance.

== History ==
The Van Pelt Library was constructed in 1962 after Penn's library outgrew the Frank Furness Building (which now houses Fisher Fine Arts Library). In 1966, the Dietrich wing was added to the building, and the building's official name was changed to the Van Pelt-Dietrich Library Center to reflect the addition. The Lippincott Library for the Wharton School underwent a major renovation in 1967. In 1990, the Goldstein Undergraduate Study Center was added to the basement level, and during the school year, this area is available 24/7 to Penn students from when the library opens on Sunday morning through to Friday evenings. In 2006, the Weigle Information Commons was constructed.

The Kislak Center for Special Collections, Rare Books and Manuscripts, a newly reconfigured 27,000 square-foot space opened in 2013. This major renovation included a completely renovated 6th floor with gallery space, meeting rooms, the Horace Howard Furness Shakespeare Library, a glass-walled pavilion, and spaces for study and events, and an expansion of special collections stacks to Van Pelt's 5th floor.

The annual A.S.W. Rosenbach Lectures in Bibliography are held at the Kislak Center.

== Area Studies ==
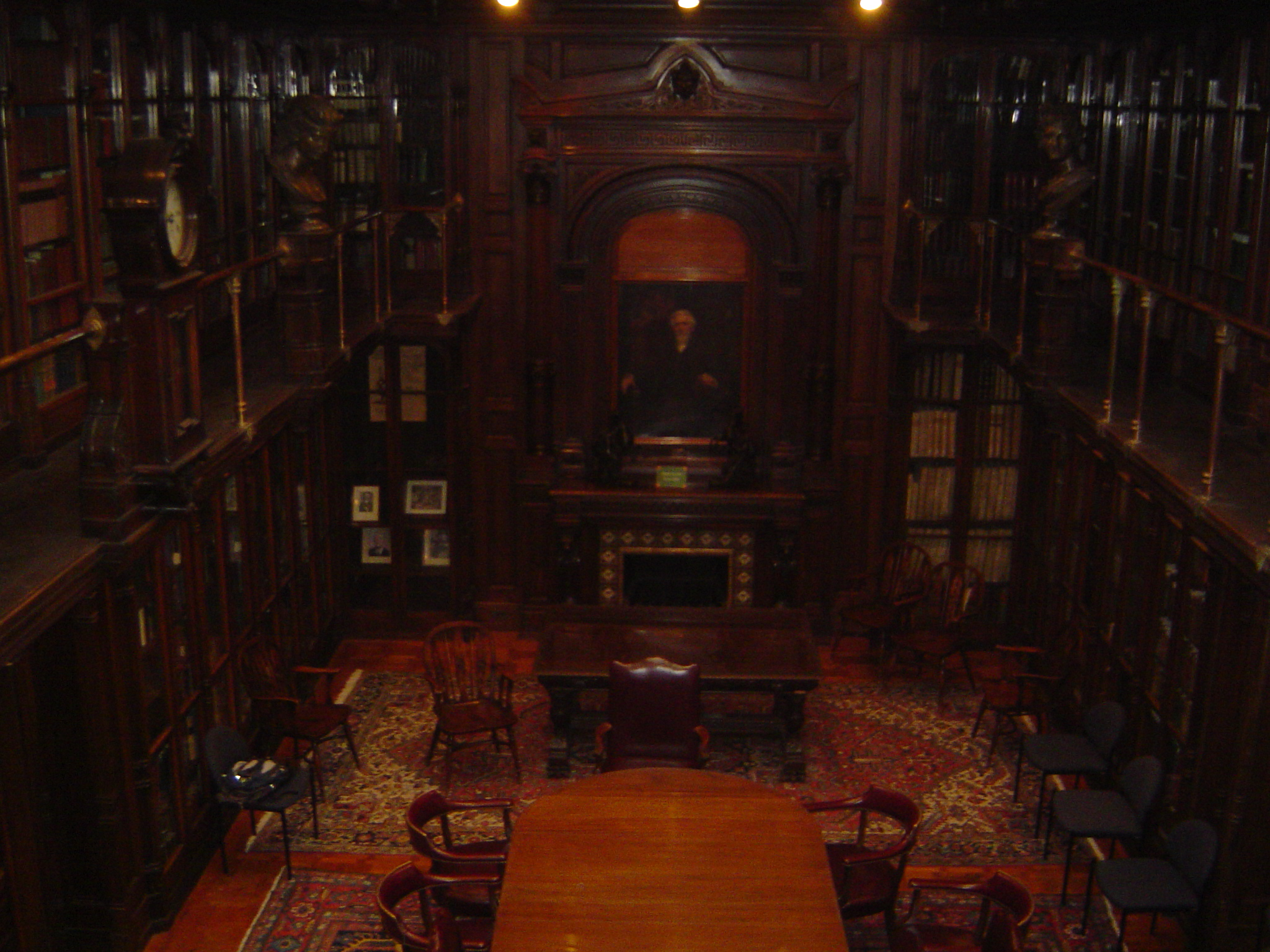
The Henry Charles Lea Library in the Van Pelt Library

Van Pelt Library also houses all the specialized Area Studies within the library system, namely East Asia, Middle East and South Asia. The bibliographers for Africa, Latin America and Judaica are also based in the same building.

== Weigle Information Commons ==
The David B. Weigle Information Commons (WIC) is a technology hub located in the library. WIC offers services such as video recording rooms, videoconferencing, "data diner booths", group study rooms, and photo, video, and music editing software. WIC was built in April 2006 on the 1st floor (west) of Van Pelt.

== See also ==
- Yarnall Library of Theology
