= Center for Art and Archaeology =

Center for Art and Archaeology is an archive and research center based in India for the study of South Asian art and archaeology. It is one of the two main Centers belonging to the American Institute of Indian Studies. It has its international headquarters situated in Gurgaon, Haryana.

Center for Art and Archaeology was established in 1965 as the American Academy of Banaras. It was set up with the mission to carry out original research on South Asian cultural history and archaeology, and to facilitate the research of visiting scholars. The Center has been dedicated towards developing knowledge about India’s rich visual traditions and is best known for its multi-volume Encyclopedia of Indian Temple Architecture.

CA and A has a freely accessible open stack library and photo archives. It has a collection of over 50000 books, journals, off prints of research articles and papers, and maps, with a variety of subjects covered including art, architecture, archaeology, cultural history, Indology, religion, epistemology, design, textiles and performing arts.

The Center also has a photo-archive with over 150000 meticulously documented photographs and slides, of south Asian art and architecture and covering monuments, sites, and museum collections. The photo-archive's collection represents: architecture, sculpture, terracotta, paintings, and numismatics. In past few years the CA and A has also helped various government agencies including the Archaeological Survey of India to document, digitize and archive the heritage collections of their regions.
