= Rosane Rocher =

Rosane Rocher (née Debels, born 10 August 1937) is a leading historian of Indology and a Professor Emerita of South Asia Studies at the University of Pennsylvania.

Born in Mouscron, Belgium, she earned MAs in Classics in 1959 and in Indo-Iranian studies in 1961, and a PhD in Sanskrit linguistics in 1965 at the Free University of Brussels. She was a Research Fellow of the Belgian National Science Foundation from 1961 to 1970. Moving to Philadelphia (American citizen 1972) with her husband, Ludo Rocher, she began teaching in 1970 at the University of Pennsylvania, where she became Chair of the Department of South Asia Studies, Director of the National Resource Center for South Asia, and Founding Director of the Program in Asian American Studies.

She is the author of several books and many articles, and has been a contributor to the Oxford Dictionary of National Biography, Encyclopedia of Asian History, History of the Language Sciences, International Encyclopedia of Linguistics, and Encyclopedia of Language and Linguistics, among others. She lives in Philadelphia. Her husband Ludo Rocher, W. Norman Brown Professor Emeritus of South Asia Studies at the University of Pennsylvania, died in 2016.

Dr. Rosane Rocher and Dr. Ludo Rocher were jointly awarded the 2015 prize of the Fondation Colette Caillat of the Institut de France "for their latest two joint books, The Making of Western Indology: Henry Thomas Colebrooke and the East India Company (2012) and Founders of Western Indology: August Wilhelm von Schlegel and Henry Thomas Colebrooke in Correspondence 1820–1837 (2013), and for their lifelong, signal contributions to Sanskrit studies and the history of Indology". She is currently the Chair of the Board of Trustees of The Ludo and Rosane Rocher Foundation (rocherfoundation.org), which fosters American scholarship on classical Indology.

== Select bibliography ==
- A Shunned Indologist: Ludwig Poley (1805-1885). Wiesbaden: Harrassowitz, 2023.
- For the Sake of the Vedas: The Anglo-German Life of Friedrich Rosen 1805–1837. Wiesbaden: Harrassowitz, 2020. (with Agnes Stache-Weiske)
- Founders of Western Indology: August Wilhelm Schlegel and Henry Thomas Colebrooke in Correspondence 1820–1837. Wiesbaden: Harrassowitz, 2013. (with Ludo Rocher)
- The Making of Western Indology: Henry Thomas Colebrooke and the East India Company. London: Routledge, 2012. (with Ludo Rocher)
- Private Fortunes and Company Profits in the Indian Trade in the Eighteenth Century by Holden Furber. London: Variorum, 1997.
- Orientalism, Poetry, and the Millennium: The Checkered Life of Nathaniel Brassey Halhed (1751-1830). Delhi: Motilal Banarsidass, 1983.
- India and Indology: Selected Articles by W. Norman Brown [with a biographical sketch]. Delhi: Motilal Banarsidass, 1978.
- Alexander Hamilton (1762-1824): A Chapter in the Early History of Sanskrit Philology. New Haven: American Oriental Society, 1968.
- La théorie des voix du verbe dans l’école pāņinéenne (le 14e āhnika). Brussels: Presses Universitaires de Bruxelles - Paris: Presses Universitaires de France, 1968.
- Manuel de grammaire élémentaire de la langue sanskrite [from the German by Jan Gonda]. Leiden: Brill - Paris: Adrien Maisonneuve, 1966.
