= Henry M. Hoenigswald =

German-American linguist (1915–2003)

- Born: Heinrich Max Franz Hönigswald; 17 April 1915; Breslau, German Empire (now Wrocław, Poland)
- Died: 16 June 2003 (aged 88); Haverford, Pennsylvania
- Spouse: Gabriele Schoepflich (m. 1944; died 2001)
- Children: 2

Academic work
- Discipline: Historical linguistics
- Institutions: Yale University; University of Pennsylvania

Henry Max Hoenigswald (17 April 1915 – 16 June 2003) was a German-American scholar of linguistics, who in 1939 escaped to the United States where he had a long and productive academic career as a scholar of historical linguistics at the University of Pennsylvania.

== Biography ==
Hoenigswald was born Heinrich Max Franz Hönigswald in Breslau, German Empire (now Wrocław, Poland). He was Professor of Linguistics at the University of Pennsylvania (1948–85; Emeritus). He married Gabriele Schoepflich in 1944 (she died in 2001; they had two daughters),

He was educated in the Johannesgymnasium Breslau (or Johanneum Breslau), where he learned the classical languages, and trained as an Indo-Europeanist and a historical and comparative linguist in universities in Munich, Zurich, Padua, and Florence. His refugee status compelled these moves (his grandparents were Jewish, and by 1933 Jews were forbidden to attend German universities). In 1939 he escaped to the United States, where he was at first a research assistant at Yale. He taught at the University of Pennsylvania from 1948 until his retirement in 1985. He was a member of the Linguistic Society of America, of which he was elected President in 1958, and a member of the American Philosophical Society for more than 30 years. He was elected to the National Academy of Sciences. He spent a year at Oxford in 1976 and was elected a Corresponding Fellow of the British Academy in 1986.

His arrival in the United States meant not only an end of political oppression but also working contact with scholars who were establishing linguistics as a science, notably Zellig Harris. Deeply familiar with the solid work done by historical linguists, but skeptical by nature, he rapidly came to question their stated rationale and justification for these results, "the gap between substantive practice and theoretical preachment". His work included on the one hand specific penetrating studies in Indo-European and Classical linguistics, and on the other fundamental work in the theory of historical linguistics, some of the first and most lastingly important attempts at formalization of the techniques of historical comparison and reconstruction.

His major work Language change and linguistic reconstruction (Hoenigswald 1960) recapitulates and epitomizes his thinking and his way of working. It exemplifies well several cardinal features of all his work: his conciseness of expression, his formal methods, his recognition that changes, whether in phonology, morphology, or semantics, are changes in the distribution of elements relative to one another, including nil as an element, and his conviction that it is not proper to present historical materials "downward, as history" but rather "upward in time, as inference".

Personally, he was deeply committed to liberal causes, and strongly averse to cant and rhetoric of any kind. His generosity to deserving students "was rewarded with feelings of intellectual admiration and personal warmth toward him" that persist.

Hoenigswald died in Haverford, Pennsylvania at the age of 88.

== Books ==
- 1945–47. Spoken Hindustani, I and II. New York: Henry Holt.
- 1960. Language Change and Linguistic Reconstruction. Chicago: University of Chicago Press. 232 pp.
- 1970. Indo-European and Indo-Europeans. [Co-editor with G. Cardona and A. Senn.] Philadelphia: University of Pennsylvania Press. 440 pp.
- 1973. Studies in Formal Historical Linguistics. Dordrecht: Reidel. 63 pp.
- 1979. The European Background of American Linguistics: Papers of the Third Golden Anniversary Symposium of the Linguistic Society of America.[Editor.] Lisse: Foris Publishers. 180 pp.
- 1987. Biological Metaphor and Cladistic Classification. [Co-editor with Linda F. Wiener.] Philadelphia: University of Pennsylvania Press. 286 pp.
- 1989. General and Amerindian Ethnolinguistics: In Remembrance of Stanley Newman. [Co-editor with M. R. Key.] Berlin/New York: DeGruyter. 499 pp.
