= Ludo Rocher =

Belgian-American indologist (1926–2016)

Ludo Rocher (1926–2016) was an eminent Sanskrit scholar, and the W. Norman Brown Professor Emeritus of South Asia Studies at the University of Pennsylvania.

== Biography ==
Ludo Rocher was born in Hemiksem in the province of Antwerp, Belgium on 25 April 1926. He became a U.S. citizen in 1972.

Rocher received his MA (summa cum laude) in Classics with a minor in Sanskrit in 1948 from the University of Ghent. Subsequently, he was awarded two doctorates by the same university – a JD (Juris Doctor) in 1950 and a PhD (also summa cum laude) in 1952. His principal teacher at the university was Adriaan Scharpé. He also studied Veda with Jan Gonda at the University of Utrecht, as well as Mīmāṃsā, Nyāya, and Vyākaraṇa privately with Barend Faddegon, then Emeritus Professor of the University of Amsterdam. He spent a post-doctoral semester at the School of Oriental and African Studies, University of London, where he studied Sanskrit with C.A. Rylands, Hindi with John Burton-Page, and Hindu law and the Indian Constitution with Alan Gledhill. From 1953 to 1955, he conducted research in manuscript collections in India. Primarily based at the Deccan College, Pune, he also studied with Pandit T.S. Śrīnivāsa Śāstrī. He was a Research Fellow of the Belgian National Science Foundation from 1952 to 1958.

After obtaining his Habilitation in 1956, he served as Professor of Comparative Philology and Sanskrit at the University of Brussels from 1959 to 1966. He was also the founding Director of the Center for Study of South and Southeast Asia at the University of Brussels from 1961 to 1967.

At the invitation of Prof. W. Norman Brown, Rocher then moved to Philadelphia, where he was appointed Professor of Sanskrit at the University of Pennsylvania. From 1966 to 2002, with interruptions, he was the Chair of the Department of Oriental Studies (renamed Department of Asian and Middle Eastern Studies in 1991). He was also a Visiting Professor of the School of Oriental and African Studies, University of London, in 1965, and at the University of Leuven, Belgium, in 1976.

Rocher was President of the American Oriental Society in 1985–1986, and Chairman of the Board of Trustees of the American Institute of Indian Studies in 1984–1985. He was elected a Member of the American Philosophical Society and of the Royal Academy of Overseas Sciences (Belgium). He was also elected a Fellow of the Asiatic Society (Calcutta) where he frequently conducted research.

Rocher was the author of over twenty books. In addition, he published numerous articles on legal and other branches of Sanskrit literature. He was an authority on Dharmaśāstra and Hindu Law.

He lived with his wife Rosane Rocher in Philadelphia and died, at the age of 90, on 2 November 2016.

== Awards ==
Ludo Rocher and Rosane Rocher were jointly awarded the 2015 prize of the Fondation Colette Caillat of the Institut de France for their "two joint books, The Making of Western Indology: Henry Thomas Colebrooke and the East India Company (2012) and Founders of Western Indology: August Wilhelm von Schlegel and Henry Thomas Colebrooke 1820–1837 (2013), and for their lifelong, signal contributions to Sanskrit studies and the history of Indology".

== Select bibliography ==
- Vyavahārasaukhya: The Treatise on Legal Procedure in the Ṭoḍarānanda composed at the instance of Ṭoḍaramalla during the reign of Akbar (Florence: Società Editrice Fiorentina, 2016).
- Founders of Western Indology: August Wilhelm Von Schlegel and Henry Thomas Colebrooke in Correspondence 1820-1837, co-authored with Rosane Rocher, (Wiesbaden: Otto Harrassowitz, 2013).
- Studies in Hindu law and Dharmaśāstra, edited with a foreword by Donald R. Davis, (London; New York: Anthem Press, 2012).
- The making of western Indology: Henry Thomas Colebrooke and the East India Company, co-authored with Rosane Rocher, (Milton Park, Abingdon, Oxon; New York: Routledge, 2012).
- Jīmūtavāhana's Dāyabhāga: The Hindu law of inheritance in Bengal (Oxford; New York: Oxford University Press, 2002).
- Studies in Indian literature and philosophy: collected articles of J.A.B. van Buitenen (Delhi: American Institute of Indian Studies: Motilal Banarsidass, 1988).
- The Purāṇas, A History of Indian Literature, 2 [Epics and Sanskrit Religious Literature, fasc. 3] (Wiesbaden: Otto Harrassowitz, 1986).
- Ezourvedam: a French Veda of the eighteenth century (Amsterdam; Philadelphia: J. Benjamins, 1984).
- Dissertation on the Sanskrit language by Paulinus a S. Bartholomaeo: with an introductory article, a complete English translation, and an index of sources (Amsterdam: Benjamins, 1977).
- Smṛticintāmaṇi of Gaṅgāditya (Baroda: Oriental Institute, Maharaja Sayajirao University of Baroda, 1976).
- Le problème linguistique en Inde (Bruxelles: Académie royale des sciences d'outre-mer, 1968).
- Droit hindou ancien (Bruxelles: Éditions de l'Institut de sociologie, Université libre de Bruxelles, 1965).
- The theory of proof in ancient Hindu law (Bruxelles: Librairie Encyclopédique, 1964).
- De Katha-Upanishad (Antwerpen: Ontwikkeling, 1964).
- Leerboek van het moderne Hindi. Manual of Modern Hindi (Gent: University, 1958).
- Preemtsjand: Novellen. Uit het Hindie vertaald [Stories of Premchand, translated from Hindi into Dutch] (Antwerpen: De Nederlandse Boekhandel, 1958).
- Vācaspati Miśra: Vyavahāracintāmaṇi. A Digest on Legal Procedure (Gent: University, 1956).

Festschrift

- Festschrift for Professor Ludo Rocher (editors Richard W. Lariviere and Richard Salomon) (Madras: Adyar Library and Research Centre, The Theosophical Society, 1987).

== Legacy ==
His notable students include,

- Prof. Rosane D. Rocher (University of Pennsylvania),
- Prof. Madhav Deshpande (University of Michigan, Ann Arbor),
- Prof. Robert P. Goldman (University of California, Berkeley),
- Prof. Richard G. Salomon (University of Washington),
- Prof. J. Patrick Olivelle (University of Texas),
- Dr. Richard W. Lariviere (President, The Field Museum, Chicago),
- Prof. Mitchell G. Weiss (University of Basel),
- Prof. Frederick M. Smith (University of Iowa),
- Prof. Xinru Liu (Institute of World History, Chinese Academy of Social Sciences),
- Prof. Signe M. Cohen (University of Missouri).
- Prof. John Nemec (University of Virginia).
