= American Society For Premodern Asia =

Researches languages and literature of the Near East and Asia

- American Oriental Society medallion
- Established: September 7, 1842
- Location: Ann Arbor, Michigan
- Type: Learned society
- Collection size: Yale Library
- Presidents: Martha Roth, University of Chicago
- Website: aspa1842.org

The American Society For Premodern Asia (formerly American Oriental Society) is a learned society that encourages basic research in the languages and literatures of the Near East and Asia. It was chartered under the laws of Massachusetts on September 7, 1842. It is one of the oldest learned societies in the United States and is the oldest devoted to a particular field of scholarship. The Society changed its name in 2025 from "American Oriental Society" to "American Society For Premodern Asia." The new name was used in the journal from 2026.

The Society encourages basic research in the languages and literatures of the Near East and Asia and covers subjects such as philology, literary criticism, textual criticism, paleography, epigraphy, linguistics, biography, archaeology, and the history of the intellectual and imaginative aspects of Eastern civilizations, especially of philosophy, religion, folklore and art.

It operates as a 501(c)(3) Public Charity. In 2024 it claimed $252,018 in total revenue and $5,401,763 in total assets.

It is closely associated with Yale University, which is the site of its library. The society publishes a quarterly journal, the Journal of the American Society For Premodern Asia (JASPA) (until 2025 it was the Journal of the American Oriental Society, JAOS), an important American academic journal on the historical languages and cultures of Asia. Former presidents include Theodore Dwight Woolsey, James Hadley, William Dwight Whitney, Daniel C. Gilman, William H. Ward, Crawford H. Toy, Murray Emeneau, Morris Jastrow, Jr., Harold H. Bender and Ludo Rocher.
