= American Institute of Indian Studies =

- Abbreviation: AIIS
- Formation: 1961
- Type: NGO
- Headquarters: University of Chicago
- President: Sumathi Ramaswamy
- Website: www.indiastudies.org

The American Institute of Indian Studies (AIIS), founded in 1961, is a consortium of 90 universities and colleges in the United States that promotes the advancement of knowledge about India in the U.S. It carries out this purpose by: awarding fellowships to scholars and artists to carry out their research and artistic projects in India; by operating intensive programs in a variety of Indian languages in India; by sponsoring conferences, workshops and outreach activities; by supporting U.S. study abroad and service learning programs in India; by assisting and facilitating the research of all U.S. scholars in India; and by operating two research archives, the Archives and Research Center for Ethnomusicology and the Center for Art and Archaeology. The AIIS is a member of the Council of American Overseas Research Centers.

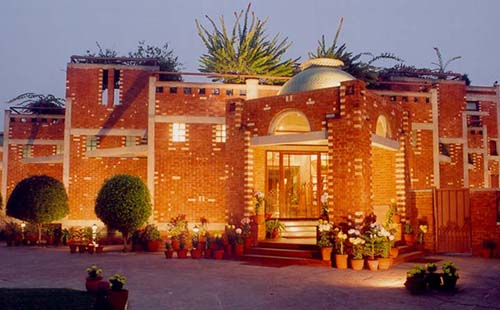
AIIS campus in Gurugram, Haryana, India

== Activities ==
The U.S. headquarter of the AIIS is at the University of Pittsburgh. The main center in India is at Gurugram with an additional center in Defence Colony in New Delhi. The AIIS also has offices in Kolkata and Pune. The AIIS awards junior fellowships to Ph.D. candidates at universities in the U.S. to carry out their doctoral dissertation research in India. Senior fellowships are for scholars holding the doctoral degree to conduct their research in India. AIIS fellows are scholars in a broad range of academic disciplines including Anthropology, Geography, History, Literature, Political Science, Public Health, Regional Planning, Religious Studies and many other fields. AIIS also offers performing and creative arts fellowships to musicians, dancers, visual and multi-media artists to carry out their artistic projects in India. AIIS operates intensive language programs in India for the summer and the academic year. The language programs are located at sites where the language is spoken. The Hindi program is the largest, located in Jaipur. Other programs include Urdu and Mughal Persian (located in Lucknow), Bengali (located in Kolkata), Punjabi (located in Chandigarh), Marathi and Sanskrit (located in Pune), Tamil (located in Madurai), Malayalam (located in Thiruvananthapuram), Telugu (located in Hyderabad) and Gujarati (located in Ahmedabad). AIIS also offers programs in very rarely taught languages such as Oriya and Sindhi, upon request. The AIIS operates the Bengali, Hindi, Punjabi and Urdu summer language programs for the U.S. State Department's Critical Language Scholarship Program at its centers in Kolkata, Jaipur, Chandigarh, and Lucknow respectively. AIIS also operates the fall semester Hindi and Urdu programs for the South Asia Flagship Languages Initiative (SAFLI) for Boren Scholars. The AIIS awards annual book prizes to young scholars and also holds a dissertation-to-book workshop at the annual Madison South Asia conference in October. AIIS offers an array of services to U.S. study abroad programs, including assistance with obtaining student visas as well as logistical support. AIIS is also involved in a project to facilitate American students' service learning internships with Indian NGOs. AIIS also hosts conferences, symposia, and workshops sometimes with other members of the Council of American Overseas Research Centers, such as a workshop on Sufi Shrines held in Aurangabad, India in August 2014. AIIS publishes semiannual newsletters reporting on its fellows' research, the activities of its research centers, and events such as conferences and workshops. The AIIS is actively engaged in publishing the Encyclopaedia of Indian Temple Architecture, a multi-volume work.

== Archives ==
The AIIS runs the Archive and Research Center for Ethnomusicology and the Center for Art and Archaeology at Gurgaon, both major research centers with large libraries and archives. A collection of photographs from the AIIS forms the main component of the South Asia Art Archive at the University of Pennsylvania, established in 1979. The only other such collection is the AIIS collection at Gurgaon.

The AIIS has partnered with ARTstor to share over 50,000 images of Indian art and architecture from the AIIS photo archive in a Digital Library. In all the archive contains about 140,000 photographs and slides of sculpture, numismatics, painting, manuscripts and miniature paintings. It also contains images, architectural drawings, and site plans of Buddhist, Jain, Hindu, and Islamic architecture.

== Funding ==
The AIIS receives grants from the U.S. State Department through the Council of American Overseas Research Centers and through its Critical Languages Scholarship Program; from the National Endowment for the Humanities through its Fellowship Programs at Independent Research Institutions program; from the U.S. Department of Education through its Group Projects Abroad and American Overseas Research Centers program; through language tuition and program fees, institutional membership fees and contributions.

== Member Institutions ==
American University

Amherst College

Arizona State University

Boston University

Brandeis University

Brown University

Bucknell University

Carleton College

Claremont McKenna College

Colby College

Colgate University

College of Charleston

College of William & Mary

Columbia University

Cornell University

Dartmouth College

Duke University

Elon University

Emory University

Florida State University

George Washington University

Georgetown University

Harvard University

Independent Scholars of South Asia

Indiana University

James Madison University

Johns Hopkins University

Kansas State University

Kennesaw State University

Loyola Marymount University

Michigan State University

Middlebury College

New School University

New York University

North Carolina State University

Northern Arizona University

Northwestern University

Oberlin College

Ohio State University

Pennsylvania State University

Portland State University

Princeton University

Rutgers University

Salisbury University

Stanford University

SUNY Buffalo

SUNY Oswego

SUNY Stony Brook

Syracuse University

Temple University

Texas A & M University

Texas State University

Tufts University

University of Arizona

University of California, Berkeley

University of California, Irvine

University of California, Los Angeles

University of California, San Diego

University of California, Santa Barbara

University of Chicago

University of Cincinnati

University of Colorado

University of Dayton

University of Florida

University of Hawaii

University of Illinois

University of Iowa

University of Massachusetts, Boston

University of Michigan

University of Minnesota

University of Missouri

University of Nebraska–Lincoln

University of North Carolina, Chapel Hill

University of North Texas

University of Oregon

University of Pennsylvania

University of Pittsburgh

University of Rochester

University of Texas, Austin

University of Utah

University of Virginia

University of Washington

University of Wisconsin

Virginia Polytechnic Institute and State University

Wake Forest University

Washington University in St. Louis

Wellesley College

Wesleyan University

Yale University
