= Reduplication =

Linguistic phenomenon

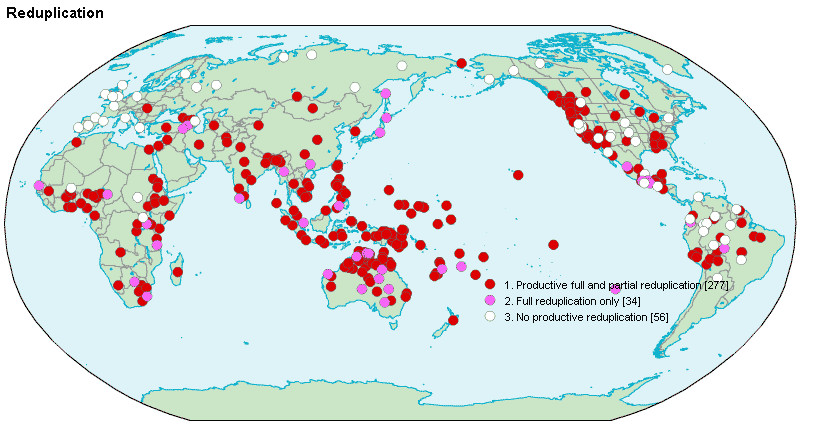
Occurrence of reduplication across world languages

In linguistics, reduplication is a morphological process in which the root or stem of a word, part of that, or the whole word is repeated exactly or with a slight change.

The classic observation on the semantics of reduplication is Edward Sapir's: "Generally employed, with self-evident symbolism, to indicate such concepts as distribution, plurality, repetition, customary activity, increase of size, added intensity, continuance." It is used in inflections to convey a grammatical function, such as plurality or intensification, and in lexical derivation to create new words. It is often used when a speaker adopts a tone more expressive or figurative than ordinary speech and is also often, but not exclusively, iconic in meaning. It is found in a wide range of languages and language groups, though its level of linguistic productivity varies. Examples can be found in language as old as Sumerian, where it was used in forming some color terms, e.g. babbar "white", kukku "black".

The most recent major contribution and reference on reduplication is by Dariush Borbor's Dictionary of Reduplication which gives a comprehensive, classified listing of reduplicates in Arabic, Armenian, Kurdish, Persian and Turkish, the major languages of the Middle East and Iran.

Reduplication is the standard term for this phenomenon in the linguistics literature. Other occasional terms include cloning, doubling, duplication, repetition, and tautonymy (when it is used in biological taxonomies, such as Bison bison).

== Typological description ==
=== Form ===
Reduplication is often described phonologically in one of two ways: either (1) as reduplicated segments (sequences of consonants/vowels) or (2) as reduplicated prosodic units (syllables or moras). In addition to phonological description, reduplication often needs to be described morphologically as a reduplication of linguistic constituents (i.e. words, stems, roots). As a result, reduplication is interesting theoretically as it involves the interface between phonology and morphology.

The base is the word (or part of the word) that is to be copied. The reduplicated element is called the reduplicant, often abbreviated as RED or sometimes just R.

In reduplication, the reduplicant is most often repeated only once. In some languages, it can occur more than once, resulting in a tripled form, and not a duple as in most reduplication. Triplication is the term for this phenomenon of copying two times. Pingelapese has both forms. In this article, English translations of words are shown in apostrophes:

Basic verb	Reduplication	Triplication
kɔul 'to sing'	kɔukɔul 'singing'	kɔukɔukɔul 'still singing'
mejr 'to sleep'	mejmejr 'sleeping'	mejmejmejr 'still sleeping'

Triplication occurs in other languages, e.g. Ewe, Shipibo, Twi, Mokilese, Min Nan (Hokkien), Stau.

Sometimes gemination (i.e. the doubling of consonants or vowels) is considered to be a form of reduplication. The term dupleme has been used (after morpheme) to refer to different types of reduplication that have the same meaning.

==== Full and partial ====
Full reduplication involves a reduplication of the entire word. For example, Kham derives reciprocal forms from reflexive forms by total reduplication:

[ɡin]	'ourselves'	→	[ɡinɡin]	'we (to) us'	(ɡin-ɡin)
[jaː]	'themselves'	→	[jaːjaː]	'they (to) them'	(jaː-jaː)	(Watters 2002)

Another example is from Musqueam Halkomelem "dispositional" aspect formation:

[kʼʷə́ɬ]	'to capsize'	→	[kʼʷə́ɬkʼʷəɬ]	'likely to capsize'	(kʼʷə́ɬ-kʼʷəɬ)
[qʷél]	'to speak'	→	[qʷélqʷel]	'talkative'	(qʷél-qʷel)	(Shaw 2004)

Partial reduplication involves a reduplication of only part of the word. For example, Marshallese forms words meaning 'to wear X' by reduplicating the last consonant-vowel-consonant (CVC) sequence of a base, i.e. base+CVC:

kagir	'belt'	→	kagirgir	'to wear a belt'	(kagir-gir)
takin	'sock'	→	takinkin	'to wear socks'	(takin-kin)	(Moravsik 1978)

Many languages often use both full and partial reduplication, as in the Motu example below:

Base verb	Full reduplication	Partial reduplication
mahuta 'to sleep'	mahutamahuta 'to sleep constantly'	mamahuta 'to sleep (plural)'
	(mahuta-mahuta)	(ma-mahuta)

==== Reduplicant position ====
Reduplication may be initial (i.e. prefixal), final (i.e. suffixal), or internal (i.e. infixal), e.g.

Initial reduplication in Agta (CV- prefix):

[ɸuɾab]	'afternoon'	→	[ɸuɸuɾab]	'late afternoon'	(ɸu-ɸuɾab)
[ŋaŋaj]	'a long time'	→	[ŋaŋaŋaj]	'a long time (in years)'	(ŋa-ŋaŋaj)	(Healey 1960)

Final reduplication in Dakota (-CCV suffix):

[hãska]	'tall (singular)'	→	[hãskaska]	'tall (plural)'	(hãska-ska)
[waʃte]	'good (singular)'	→	[waʃteʃte]	'good (plural)'	(waʃte-ʃte)	(Shaw 1980, Marantz 1982, Albright 2002)

Internal reduplication in Samoan (-CV- infix):

savali	'he/she walks' (singular)	→	savavali	'they walk' (plural)	(sa-va-vali)
alofa	'he/she loves' (singular)	→	alolofa	'they love' (plural)	(a-lo-lofa)	(Moravcsik 1978, Broselow and McCarthy 1984)
le tamaloa	'the man' (singular)	→	tamaloloa	'men' (plural)	(tama-lo-loa)

Internal reduplication is much less common than the initial and final types.

==== Copying direction ====
A reduplicant can copy from either the left edge of a word (left-to-right copying) or from the right edge (right-to-left copying). There is a tendency for prefixing reduplicants to copy left-to-right and for suffixing reduplicants to copy right-to-left:

Initial L → R copying in Oykangand Kunjen (a Pama–Nyungan language of Australia):

[eder]	→	[ededer]	'rain'	(ed-eder)
[alɡal]	→	[alɡalɡal]	'straight'	(alg-algal)

Final R → L copying in Sirionó:

achisia	→	achisiasia	'I cut'	(achisia-sia)
ñimbuchao	→	ñimbuchaochao	'to come apart'	(ñimbuchao-chao)	(McCarthy and Prince 1996)

Copying from the other direction is possible although less common:

Initial R → L copying in Tillamook:

[ɡaɬ]	'eye'	→	[ɬɡaɬ]	'eyes'	(ɬ-ɡaɬ)
[təq]	'break'	→	[qtəq]	'they break'	(q-təq)	(Reichard 1959)

Final L → R copying in Chukchi:

nute-	'ground'	→	nutenut	'ground (abs. sg.)'	(nute-nut)
jilʔe-	'gopher'	→	jilʔejil	'gopher (abs. sg.)'	(jilʔe-jil)	(Marantz 1982)

Internal reduplication can also involve copying the beginning or end of the base. In Quileute, the first consonant of the base is copied and inserted after the first vowel of the base.

Internal L → R copying in Quileute:

[tsiko]	'he put it on'	→	[tsitsko]	'he put it on (frequentative)'	(tsi-ts-ko)
[tukoːjoʔ]	'snow'	→	[tutkoːjoʔ]	'snow here and there'	(tu-t-ko:jo’)	(Broselow and McCarthy 1984)

In Temiar, the last consonant of the root is copied and inserted before the medial consonant of the root.

Internal R → L copying in Temiar (an Austroasiatic language of Malaysia):

[sluh]	'to shoot (perfective)'	→	[shluh]	'to shoot (continuative)'	(s-h-luh)
[slɔɡ]	'to marry (perfective)'	→	[sɡlɔɡ]	'to marry (continuative)'	(s-ɡ-lɔɡ)	(Broselow and McCarthy 1984, Walther 2000)

A rare type of reduplication is found in Semai (an Austroasiatic language of Malaysia). "Expressive minor reduplication" is formed with an initial reduplicant that copies the first and last segment of the base:

[kʉːʔ]	→	[kʔkʉːʔ]	'to vomit'	(kʔ-kʉːʔ)
[dŋɔh]	→	[dhdŋɔh]	'appearance of nodding constantly'	(dh-dŋɔh)
[cruhaːw]	→	[cwcruhaːw]	'monsoon rain'	(cw-cruhaːw)	Diffloth 1973

==== With other morphological processes ====
All the examples above consist of only reduplication, which also often occurs with other phonological and morphological processes, such as vowel alternation, deletion and affixation of non-reduplicating material.

For instance, in Tz'utujil a new '-ish' adjective form is derived from other words by suffixing the reduplicated first consonant of the base followed by the segment [oχ]. This can be written succinctly as -Coχ. Below are some examples:

- [kaq] 'red' → [kaqkoχ] 'reddish' (kaq-k-oχ)
- [qʼan] 'yellow' → [qʼanqʼoχ] 'yellowish' (qʼan-qʼ-oχ)
- [jaʔ] 'water' → [jaʔjoχ] 'watery' (jaʔ-j-oχ) (Dayley 1985)

Somali has a similar suffix that is used in forming the plural of some nouns: -aC (where C is the last consonant of the base):

- [toɡ] 'ditch' → [toɡaɡ] 'ditches' (toɡ-a-ɡ)
- [ʕad] 'lump of meat' → [ʕadad] 'lumps of meat' (ʕad-a-d)
- [wɪːl] 'boy' → [wɪːlal] 'boys' (wɪːl-a-l) (Abraham 1964)

This combination of reduplication and affixation is commonly referred to as fixed-segment reduplication.

In Tohono O'odham initial reduplication also involves gemination of the first consonant in the distributive plural and in repetitive verbs:

- [nowiu] 'ox' → [nonnowiu] 'ox (distributive)' (no-n-nowiu)
- [hódai] 'rock' → [hohhodai] 'rock (distributive)' (ho-h-hodai)
- [kow] 'dig out of ground (unitative)' → [kokkow] 'dig out of ground (repetitive)' (ko-k-kow)
- [ɡɨw] 'hit (unitative)' → [ɡɨɡɡɨw] 'hit (repetitive)' (ɡɨ-ɡ-ɡɨw) (Haugen forthcoming)

Sometimes gemination can be analyzed as a type of reduplication.

==== Phonological processes, environment, and reduplicant-base relations ====
- overapplication
- underapplication
- backcopying – A putative phenomenon of over-application in the reduplicant of a process triggered by the reduplicant in the base
- base-reduplicant "identity" (OT terminology: BR-faithfulness)
- tonal transfer/non-transfer

=== Function and meaning ===
In the Malayo-Polynesian family, reduplication is used to form plurals (among many other functions):

- Malay rumah "house", rumah-rumah "houses".

In pre-1972 Indonesian and Malaysian orthography, 2 was shorthand for the reduplication that forms plurals: orang "person", orang-orang or orang2 "people". This orthography has resurfaced widely in text messaging and other forms of electronic communication.

The Nama language uses reduplication to increase the force of a verb: go, "look;", go-go "examine with attention".

Chinese and Japanese do not make morphological use of reduplication, but some words are formed this way, often with a collective sense: 人 rén "person", 人人 rénrén "everybody"; 時 toki "time", tokidoki 時々 "sometimes, from time to time". The iteration mark 々 can be used to indicate reduplication, although in Chinese the iteration mark is no longer used in standard writing and is often found only in calligraphy.

Indo-European languages formerly used reduplication to form a number of verb forms, especially in the preterite or perfect. In the older Indo-European languages, many such verbs survive:

- spondeo, spopondi (Latin, "I vow, I vowed")
- λείπω, λέλοιπα (Greek, "I leave, I left")
- δέρκομαι, δέδορκα (Greek, "I see, I saw"; these Greek examples exhibit ablaut as well as reduplication)
- háitan, haíháit (Gothic, "to name, I named")

Those forms do not survive in Modern English but existed in its parent Germanic languages. Many verbs in the Indo-European languages exhibit reduplication in the present stem, rather than the perfect stem, often with a different vowel from that used for the perfect: Latin gigno, genui ("I beget, I begat") and Greek τίθημι, ἔθηκα, τέθηκα (I place, I placed, I have placed). Other Indo-European verbs used reduplication as a derivational process: compare Latin sto ("I stand") and sisto ("I remain"). All of those Indo-European inherited reduplicating forms are subject to reduction by other phonological laws.

Reduplication can be used to refer to the most prototypical instance of a word's meaning. In such a case, it is called contrastive focus reduplication. Finnish colloquial speech uses the process; nouns can be reduplicated to indicate genuinity, completeness, originality and being uncomplicated, as opposed to being fake, incomplete, complicated or fussy. It can be thought as compound word formation. For example, Söin jäätelöä ja karkkia, sekä tietysti ruokaruokaa. "I ate ice cream and candy, and of course food-food". Here, "food-food" is contrasted to "junk-food". One may say, "En ollut eilen koulussa, koska olin kipeä. Siis kipeäkipeä" ("I wasn't at school yesterday because I was sick. Sick-sick, that is"); that means that one was actually suffering from an illness instead of making up excuses, as usual.

- ruoka "food", ruokaruoka "proper food", as opposed to snacks
- peli "game", pelipeli "complete game", as opposed to a mod
- puhelin "phone", puhelinpuhelin "phone for talking", as opposed to a pocket computer
- kauas "far away", kauaskauas "unquestionably far away"
- koti "home", kotikoti "home of your parents", as opposed to one's current place of residence

Words can be reduplicated with their case morphemes, as in lomalla lomalla ("away, on vacation, on leave"), where the adessive morpheme --lla appears twice.

In Swiss German, the verbs gah or goh "go", cho "come", la or lo "let" and aafa or aafo "begin" reduplicate when they are combined with other verbs.

Si chunt üse Chrischtboum cho schmücke.
she comes our {Christmas tree} come adorn
She comes to adorn our Christmas tree.

Si lat ne nid la schlafe.
she lets him not let sleep
She doesn't let him sleep.

In some Salishan languages, reduplication can mark both diminution and plurality, with one process being applied to each end of the word, as in the following example from Shuswap. Note that the transcription is not comparable to the IPA, but the reduplication of both initial and final portions of the root is clear: ṣōk!Emē'’n 'knife' reduplicated as ṣuk!ṣuk!Emen'’me’n 'plural small knives' (Haeberlin 1918:159). Reduplication has been found to be a major part of Salish languages.

== Babbling in child language acquisition ==
At 25–50 weeks after birth, typically developing infants go through a stage of reduplicated or canonical babbling (Stark 198, Oller, 1980). Canonical babbling is characterized by repetition of identical or nearly identical consonant-vowel combinations, such as nanana or idididi. It appears as a progression of language development as infants experiment with their vocal apparatus and home in on the sounds used in their native language. Canonical/reduplicated babbling also appears at a time when general rhythmic behavior, such as rhythmic hand movements and rhythmic kicking, appear. Canonical babbling is distinguished from earlier syllabic and vocal play, which has less structure.

== Examples ==
=== Indo-European ===
==== Proto-Indo-European ====
The Proto-Indo-European language used partial reduplication of a consonant and e in many stative aspect verb forms. The perfect or preterite (past) tense of some Ancient Greek, Gothic, Latin, Sanskrit, Old Irish, and Old Norse verbs preserve this reduplication:

- Ancient Greek λύω lúō 'I free' vs. λέλυκα léluka "I have freed"
- Gothic hald "I hold" vs. haíhald (hĕhald) "I/he held"
- Latin currō "I run" vs. cucurrī "I ran" or "have run"
- Old Irish maidid "it breaks" vs. memaid "it broke"
- Old Norse rœ "I row" vs. rera (røra) "I rowed"
- Sanskrit लिखति likhati 'he writes' vs. लिलेख lilekha "he has written" or "he wrote"
- A rare modern English reflex is do vs. did

Proto-Indo-European also used reduplication for the imperfective aspect. Ancient Greek preserves this reduplication in the present tense of some verbs. Usually, but not always, this is reduplication of a consonant and i, and contrasts with e-reduplication in the perfect:

- δίδωμι dídōmi "I give" (present)
- δέδωκα dédōka "I have given" (perfect)
- *σίσδω sísdō → ἵζω hízō "I set" (present)
- *σέσδομαι sésdomai → ἕζομαι hézomai "I sit down" (present; from sd-, zero-grade of root in *sed-os → ἕδος hédos "seat, abode")

Reduplication in nouns was rare, the best example being Proto-Indo-European *kʷé-kʷl-os 'wheel' (cf. Lithuanian kãklas 'neck', Sanskrit cakrá 'wheel', Greek κύκλος (kýklos) 'circle'), which doubled *kʷel-o- (cf. Old Prussian kelan 'wheel', Welsh pêl 'ball'), itself likely a deverbative of *kʷelh₁- 'to turn'.

==== English ====
English has several types of reduplication, ranging from informal expressive vocabulary (the first four forms below) to grammatically meaningful forms (the last two below). See also the alliteration section of the irreversible binomial article for cases like flip-flop and dribs and drabs.

- Rhyming reduplication: Artsy-fartsy, boogie-woogie, okey-dokey, easy-peasy, hanky-panky, hocus-pocus, hoity-toity, hokey-pokey, holy moly, hurdy-gurdy, itsy-bitsy, namby-pamby, raggle-taggle, ragtag, razzle-dazzle, super-duper, teenie-weenie, willy-nilly, wingding.
- Exact reduplications: Ack ack, aye-aye, back-to-back, blah-blah, boo-boo, bye-bye, chin-chin, choo-choo, chow-chow, dik-dik, doo-doo, fifty-fifty, gogo, ha ha, half-and-half, honk-honk, housey-housey, juju, klop-klop, mama, muumuu, night-night, no-no, papa, pee-pee, pip-pip, pom-pom, poo-poo, pooh-pooh, putt putt, so-so, ta-ta, there-there, tut-tut, tutu, wah-wah, wee-wee, yo-yo. While in many forms of English, exact reduplications can also be used to emphasise the strength of a word ("He wants it now now"), in South African English, 'now-now' means 'relatively soon'.
  - lexical reduplication: 'Each-each boy take one-one chair.' Indian English
- Ablaut reduplications: In ablaut reduplications, the first vowel is almost always a high vowel or front vowel (typically ɪ as in hit) and the reduplicated vowel is a low vowel or back vowel (typically æ as in cat or ɒ as in top). Examples include: bric-a-brac, chit-chat, clip-clop, ding-dong, flimflam, flip-flop, hip-hop, jibber-jabber, kitty-cat, knick-knack, mishmash, ping-pong, pitter-patter, riffraff, sing-song, slipslop, splish-splash, tick-tock, ticky-tacky, tip-top, whiff-whaff, wibble-wobble, wishy-washy, zig-zag. Three-part ablaut sequences are less numerous, but are attested, e.g. tic-tac-toe, bing-bang-boom, bish-bash-bosh, splish-splash-splosh and "Live, Laugh, Love". Spike Milligan's poem "On the Ning Nang Nong" achieves comic effect by varying the ordering of vowels in such triples: There's a Nong Nang Ning/Where the trees go Ping!.
- Shm-reduplication can be used with most any word; e.g. baby-shmaby, cancer-shmancer and fancy-shmancy. This process is a feature of American English from Yiddish, starting among the American Jews of New York City, then the New York dialect and then the whole country.

Of the above types, only shm-reduplication is productive, meaning that examples of the first three are fixed forms and new forms are not easily accepted.

- Comparative reduplication: In the sentence "John's apple looked redder and redder," the reduplication of the comparative indicates that the comparative is becoming more true over time, meaning roughly "John's apple looked progressively redder as time went on." In particular, this construction does not mean that John's apple is redder than some other apple, which would be a possible interpretation in the absence of reduplication, e.g. in "John's apple looked redder." With reduplication, the comparison is of the object being compared to itself over time. Comparative reduplication always combines the reduplicated comparative with "and". This construction is common in speech and is used even in formal speech settings, but it is less common in formal written texts. Although English has simple constructs with similar meanings, such as "John's apple looked ever redder," these simpler constructs are rarely used in comparison with the reduplicative form. Comparative reduplication is fully productive and clearly changes the meaning of any comparative to a temporal one, despite the absence of any time-related words in the construction. For example, the temporal meaning of "The frug seemed wuggier and wuggier" is clear: despite not knowing what a frug is or what wugginess is, it is easy to grasp that the apparent wugginess of the frug was increasing over time, as indicated by the reduplication of the comparative "wuggier".
- Contrastive focus reduplication: Exact reduplication can be used with contrastive focus (generally where the first noun is stressed) to indicate a literal, as opposed to figurative, example of a noun, or perhaps a sort of Platonic ideal of the noun, as in "Is that carrot cheesecake or carrot cake cake?". This is similar to the Finnish use mentioned above. Furthermore, it is used to contrast "real" or "pure" things against imitations or less pure forms. For example, at a coffee shop one may be asked, "Do you want soy milk?" and respond, "No, I want milk milk." This gives the idea that they want "real" milk.
- Intensificatory reduplication: Examples like a big, big problem, a long, long way, or very very difficult are instances of intensificatory reduplication. This type of reduplication is used to intensify the meaning of the original word. It's a way of expressing that something is not just big or long, but very big or very long. This type of reduplication is typically used only with a narrow range of words, and the meaning can often be inferred even if the specific combination is not a standard idiomatic expression. The more common items include gradable adjectives (e.g., big, great, deep, bad, old), along with intensificatory adverbs (e.g., very, really, so) and determiners (e.g., much). This is only possible for pre-head modifiers, and not with other syntactic functions. For example, a long long way is fine, but *the way is long long is ungrammatical, and I really really want it but not *I want it really really.

The double is—such as "What I want is, is to go home"—is in some cases a type of reduplication, which may be regarded as non-standard or incorrect.

More can be learned about English reduplication in Thun (1963), Cooper & Ross (1975), and Nevins & Vaux (2003).

==== Dutch ====
While not common in Dutch, reduplication does exist. Most, but not all (e.g., pipi, blauwblauw (laten), taaitaai (gingerbread)) reduplications in Dutch are loanwords (e.g., koeskoes, bonbon, (ik hoorde het) via via) or imitative (e.g., tamtam, tomtom). Another example is a former safe sex campaign slogan in Flanders: Eerst bla-bla, dan boem-boem (First talk, then have sex; lit. First blah-blah, then boom-boom). In Dutch the verb "gaan" (to go) can be used as an auxiliary verb, which can lead to a triplication: we gaan (eens) gaan gaan (we are going to get going). The use of gaan as an auxiliary verb with itself is considered incorrect, but is commonly used in Flanders. Numerous examples of reduplication in Dutch (and other languages) are discussed by Daniëls (2000).

==== Afrikaans ====
Afrikaans makes use of reduplication to emphasize the meaning of the word repeated and to denote a plural or event happening in more than one place. For example, krap means "to scratch one's self," while krap-krap-krap means "to scratch one's self vigorously", whereas "dit het plek-plek gereën" means "it rained here and there". Reduplication in Afrikaans has been described extensively in the literature – see for example Botha (1988), Van Huyssteen (2004) and Van Huyssteen & Wissing (2007). Further examples of this include: "koes" (to dodge) being reduplicated in the sentence "Piet hardloop koes-koes weg" (Piet is running away while constantly dodging / cringing); "sukkel" (to struggle) becoming "sukkel-sukkel" (making slow progress; struggling on); and "kierang" (to cheat) becoming "kierang-kierang" to indicate being cheated on repeatedly.

==== Romance ====
In Italian reduplication was used both to create new words or word associations (tran-tran, via via, leccalecca) and to intensify the meaning (piano piano "very softly").

Common in Lingua Franca, particularly but not exclusively for onomatopoeic action descriptions: Spagnoli venir...boum boum...andar; Inglis venir...boum boum bezef...andar; Francés venir...tru tru tru...chapar. ("The Spaniards came, cannonaded, and left. The English came, cannonaded heavily, and left. The French came, trumpeted on bugles, and captured it.")

Common uses for reduplication in French are the creation of hypocoristics for names, whereby Louise becomes Loulou, and Zinedine Zidane becomes Zizou; and in many nursery words, like dada 'horsie' (vs. cheval 'horse'), tati/tata 'auntie' (vs. tante 'aunt'), or tonton 'unkie' (vs. oncle 'uncle').

In Romanian and Catalan, reduplication is not uncommon and it has been used for both the creation of new words (including many from onomatopoeia) and expressions, for example,

- Romanian: mormăi, țurțur, dârdâi, expressions talmeș-balmeș, harcea-parcea, terchea-berchea, țac-pac, calea-valea, hodoronc-tronc.
- Catalan: així així, aixina aixana, balandrim-balandram, baliga-balaga, banzim-banzam, barliqui-barloqui, barrija-barreja, bitllo-bitllo, bub-bub, bum-bum, but-but, catric-catrac, cloc-cloc, cloc-piu, corre-corrents, de nyigui-nyogui, farrigo-farrago, flist-flast, fru-fru, gara-gara, gloc-gloc, gori-gori, leri-leri, nap-buf, ning-nang, ning-ning, non-non, nyam-nyam, nyau-nyau, nyec-nyec, nyeu-nyeu, nyic-nyic, nyigo-nyigo, nyigui-nyogui, passa-passa, pengim-penjam, pif-paf, ping-pong, piu-piu, poti-poti, rau-rau, ringo-rango, rum-rum, taf-taf, tam-tam, tau-tau, tic-tac, tol·le-tol·le, tric-trac, trip-trap, tris-tras, viu-viu, xano-xano, xau-xau, xerric-xerrac, xim-xim, xino-xano, xip-xap, xiu-xiu, xup-xup, zig-zag, ziga-zaga, zim-zam, zing-zing, zub-zub, zum-zum.

==== Slavic ====
The reduplication in the Russian language serves for various kinds of intensifying of the meaning and exists in several forms: a hyphenated or repeated word (either exact or inflected reduplication), and forms similar to shm-reduplication.

==== Celtic ====
Reduplication is a common feature of Irish and includes the examples rírá, ruaille buaille both meaning "commotion" and fite fuaite meaning "intertwined".

==== Indo-Aryan ====
Typically all Indo-Aryan languages, like Hindi, Punjabi, Gujarati and Bengali use partial or echoic reduplication in some form or the other. It is usually used to sound casual, or in a suggestive manner. It is often used to mean etcetera. For example, in Hindi, chai-shai (chai means tea, while this phrase means tea or any other supplementary drink or tea along with snacks). Quite common in casual conversations are a few more examples like shopping-wopping, khana-wana. South Asian Indo Aryan languages are also rich in other forms of reduplication: morphological (expressives), lexical (distributives), and phrasal (aspectual).

- morphological:

मनात {हूर हूर} दाटून येते
manaa-t hur-hur daaT.un yete
mind-in longing choking comes
'Yearning desire floods into my heart.' Marathi

Reduplication also occurs in the 3rd gaṇa (verb class) of the Sanskrit language: bibheti "he fears", bibharti "he bears", juhoti "he offers", dadāti, "he gives". Even though the general idea is to reduplicate the verb root as a prefix, several sandhi rules change the outcome.

There are a number of constructions in Hindi and Urdu that are constructed by reduplication. Nouns, adjectives, verbs, adverbs, pronouns, all have possibility of reduplications.

(1) Reduplication of numbers	(2) Reduplication of pronouns
{baccõ ko} ek-ek tɔfī do. children.DAT one-one.REDUP toffee give.IMP give a toffee to each child, one toffee per child.	tumne kyā-kyā dekhā? you.ERG what-what.REDUP saw.MASC.PRF? what (all things) did you see?
{bacce-bacce ko} pacās-pacās tɔfiyā̃ milī̃. child-child.DAT fifty-fifty toffees received.PRF.FEM.PL each and every child received 50 toffees each	jo-jo āẽge unhẽ kɛhnā. who-who.NOM will-come them.DAT say.IMP.FUT say to whoever will come (to all and every visitor)
(3) Reduplication of nouns	(4) Reduplication of adjectives
baccā-baccā jāntā hai. child-child.NOM know.PTCP be.3.PRES? (each and) every child knows.	ye garm-garm cāy piyo. this hot-hot tea drink.2.IMP drink this hot tea. (emphasis on hotness)
cāy-śāy {ho jāye?} tea-tea.NOM happen.PRF.SG.SUBJ? shall we have a cup of tea? (emphasis on meeting over tea)	udhar harī-harī ghās hai. {tither/that way} green-green grass be.3.PRS there is (so much) green grass that way/over there. (emphasis on the quantity)
(5) Reduplication of verbs	(6) Reduplication of adverbs
khāte-khāte mat bolo. eat-eat.PTCP.IPFV not talk.2.IMP do not talk while eating.	kal-kal mẽ {hī ho jāyegā.} tomorrow-tomorrow.LOC happen.3.FUT.PRF {} It'll be done before tomorrow ends.
soye-soye {mar gaye.} sleep-sleep.PTCP.PRF die.PRF.MASC.PL he died while sleeping / he died in his sleep.	cillāyī {zor-zor se.} shouted.PRF.SG.FEM loud-loud.INST she shouted loudly. (emphasis on the loudness)

==== Armenian ====
In Armenian, reduplication follows the same classification as in Turkish (see below), namely emphatic reduplication, echo reduplication, and doubling. Many appear as lexical entries in Armenian lexicographical sources.

1. Emphatic reduplication, one of two interpolated consonants (փ, ս), as in կարմիր (red), which becomes կասկարմիր (very red).
2. Echo Reduplication, as in սեղան-մեղան (table schmable).
3. Doubling, as in քիչ-քիչ (little [by] little)

=== Turkic ===
==== Turkish ====
In Turkish, there are three kinds of reduplication.

Emphatic reduplication, also called intensification: A word can be reduplicated partially, such that an emphatic stem is created to be attached to the adjective. This is done by taking the first syllable of the adjective, dropping the syllable-final phoneme, and adding one of four interpolated consonants (p, s, m, r). For example, kırmızı (red) becomes kıpkırmızı (very red); mavi (blue) becomes masmavi (very blue); yeşil (green) becomes yemyeşil (very green), and temiz (clean) becomes tertemiz ("spotless"). The added consonant is unpredictable, grammatically speaking; phonological studies, such as Wedel (1999), shed light on the subject.

Echo reduplication: similar to echo word in other languages, a word can be reduplicated while replacing the initial consonants (not being m, and possibly missing) with m. The meaning of the original word is broadened. For example, tabak means "plate(s)", and tabak mabak then means "plates, dishes and such". This can be applied to all kinds of words, as in yeşil meşil meaning "green, greenish, whatever". Although not used in formal written Turkish, it is a standard accepted construction.

Doubling: A word can be reduplicated totally, turning it into an adverb with a related meaning. For example, zaman zaman (time time) meaning "time to time" or "occasionally"; uzun uzun (long long) meaning "at length." This type is used also in formal Turkish, especially in literature. There are a lot of reduplications in this category which do not, if used as one word, have a place in the Turkish language's vocabulary but is used solely in this way. These words are called mimetic in linguistics. An example is 'şırıl şırıl' (used for the sound of a waterfall). They try to give sounds to not only audible but also non-audible phenomena. For example, 'mışıl mışıl' is used for sleeping soundly.

=== Dravidian ===
Reduplication is also used in Dravidian languages like Telugu for the same purpose.

==== Telugu ====
- phrasal:

పిల్లవాడు నడుస్తూ నడుస్తూ పడి పోయాడు
pillavāḍu naḍustū naḍustū paḍi pōyāḍu
child walking walking fall went
'The child fell down while walking.' Telugu

==== Tamil ====
The Tamil language uses many reduplications, both in spoken (colloquial) and in formal usage. Reduplications are called irattaik kilavi (இரட்டைக் கிளவி) in Tamil grammar.

- baga-baga (பகபக) - wolfing down food
- busu-busu (புசுபுசு) – soft and bushy
- cala-cala (சலசல) - sound of breeze, bubbling brook, cascading water
- cara-cara (சரசர) - sound of objects rubbing against one another
- choda-choda (சொதசொத) – marshy, waterlogged
- chuDa-chuDa (சுடச்சுட) – piping hot
- cuL-cuL (சுள்சுள்) - sharpness of pain
- daga-daga (தகதக) - blazing, shining, sparkling
- gaDa-gaDa (கடகட) - quickly, rapidly
- gaNIr-gaNIr (கணீர்கணீர்) - strident (like the sound of a bell)
- gaba-gaba (கபகப) - wolfing down food
- galIr-galIr (கலீர்கலீர்) - sound of walking ankle bracelets
- gama-gama (கமகம) - fragrant
- gara-gara (கரகர) – crunchy (as in food), gravely (as in voice)
- giDu-giDu (கிடுகிடு) – quickly, fast
- giru-giru (கிறுகிறு) - giddy
- gubu-gubu (குபுகுபு) - pouring forth (like smoke, flood, etc.)
- jilu-jilu, jil-jil (சில்சில்) - cool (temperature)
- kIchu-kIchu (கீச்சுகீச்சு) - screeching, like the sound of parrots
- kaDu-kaDu (கடுகடு) - angry
- kaNa-kaNa (கணகண) - warm, hot
- kala-kala (கலகல) - lively
- kozha-kozha (கொழகொழ) – slimy, gooey
- kozhu-kozhu (கொழுகொழு) – plump
- kuLu-kuLu (குளுகுளு) - cool (temperature)
- mAngu-mAngu (மாங்குமாங்கு) – laboriously
- maDa-maDa (மடமட) – quickly, fast
- masa-masa (மசமச) – sluggish, lethargic
- minu-minu (மினுமினு) - sparkling, twinkling
- mozhu-mozhu (மொழுமொழு) – smooth (surface)
- paDa-paDa (படபட) - fluttering (e.g., heartbeat)
- paLAr-paLAr (பளார்பளார்) - sound of slapping
- paLIr-paLIr (பளீர்பளீர்) - flash of light
- paLa-paLa (பளப்பள/பளபள) – glittering, shiny
- paLic-paLic (பளிச்பளிச்) - sparkling, twinkling
- para-para (பரபர) - hurried
- pisu-pisu (பிசுபிசு) - sticky
- pola-pola (பொலபொல) - easily falling off (like fruits from a tree)
- sora sora (சொறசொற) – rough (the sound produced when rubbing back and forth on a rough surface)
- Tak-Tak (டக்டக்) - quickly, rapidly
- taLa-taLa (தளதள) - lush (as in a lush plant/orchard)
- tara-tara (தறதற) - sound of dragging
- tazu-tazu (தழுதழு) - tongue-tied
- tiru-tiru (திருதிரு) - guilty, caught-red-handed look
- toLa-toLa (தொளதொள) - hanging loose (as in loose fitting)
- toNa-toNa (தொணதொண) - annoyingly incessant
- turu-turu (துறுதுறு) - brisk, active
- vazha-vazha (வழவழ) – smooth, slippery
- veDa-veDa (வெடவெட) – shaking, trembling
- vicuk-vicuk (விசுக்விசுக்) - sound of walking fast
- viru-viru (விறுவிறு) – energetically (also, spicy)

=== Bantu ===
Reduplication is a common phenomenon in Bantu languages and is usually used to form a frequentive verb or for emphasis.

- Swahili piga 'to strike'; pigapiga 'to strike repeatedly'
- Ganda okukuba (oku-kuba) 'to strike'; okukubaakuba (oku-kuba-kuba) 'to strike repeatedly, to batter'
- Chewa tambalalá 'to stretch one's legs'; tambalalá-tambalalá to stretch one's legs repeatedly'

Popular names that have reduplication include

- Bafana Bafana
- Chipolopolo
- Eric Djemba-Djemba
- Lomana LuaLua
- Ngorongoro

=== Semitic ===
Semitic languages frequently reduplicate consonants, though often not the vowels that appear next to the consonants in some verb form. This can take the shape of reduplicating the antepenultimate consonant (usually the second of three), the last of two consonants, or the last two consonants.

==== Hebrew ====
In Hebrew, reduplication is used in nouns, adjectives, adverbs and verbs for various reasons:

- For emphasis: in לאט לאט le'at le'at, where the adverb לאט "slowly" is duplicated to mean "very slowly". In the slangism גבר גבר gever gever, the noun גבר "man" is duplicated to mean a "very manly man".
- To mean "one by one":
  - יום יום yom yom is based on יום "day", and means "every day, day by day".
  - פרה פרה para para is based on פרה "cow", and literally means "cow by cow", referring to "one thing at a time". This is possibly a folk etymology, and a derivation from Spanish "para" meaning "stop" is possible.
- To create a diminutive: by reduplicating the last two consonants (bi-consonantal reduplication):
  - כלב kelev "dog"
    - כלבלב klavlav "puppy"
  - חתול khatul "cat"
    - חתלתול khataltul "kitten"
  - לבן lavan "white"
    - לבנבן levanban "whitish"
  - קטן katan "small"
    - קטנטן ktantan "tiny"
- To create secondary derivative verbs: by reduplicating the root or part of it:
  - dal (דל) "poor" > dilel (דלל) "to dilute", and also dildel (דלדל) "to impoverish, weaken".
  - nad (נד) "to move, nod" > nadad (נדד) "to wander" but also nidned (נדנד) "to swing" and - due to phono-semantic matching of the Yiddish lexical item נודיען nídyen / núdzhen "to bore, bother" - also "to bother, pest, nag, annoy".
  - tzakhak (צחק) "to laugh" > tzikhkek (צחקק) "to chuckle".
- For onomatopoeia:
  - שקשק shikshék "to make noise, rustle".
  - רשרש rishrésh "to make noise, rustle".

There are also numerous examples in the Torah, for example "אם שמוע תשמעו" which means "if you listen diligently".

==== Amharic ====
In Amharic, verb roots can be reduplicated three different ways. These can result in verbs, nouns, or adjectives (which are often derived from verbs).

From the root sbr 'break', antepenultimate reduplication produces täsäbabbärä 'it was shattered' and biconsonantal reduplication produces täsbäräbbärä 'it was shattered repeatedly' and səbərbari 'a shard, a shattered piece'.

From the root kHb 'pile stones into a wall', since the second radical is not fully specified, what some call "hollow", the antepenultimate reduplication process reduplicates the k inserting the vowel a along with the consonant as a place holder for the hollow consonant, which is by some criteria antepenultimate, and produces akakabä 'pile stones repeatedly'.

=== Japanese ===
A small number of native Japanese nouns have collective forms produced by reduplication (possibly with rendaku), such as 人々 hitobito "people" (h → b is rendaku) – these are written with the iteration mark "々" to indicate duplication. This formation is not productive and is limited to a small set of nouns. Similarly to Standard Chinese, the meaning is not that of a true plural, but collectives that refer to a large, given set of the same object; for example, the formal English equivalent of 人々 would be "people" (collective), rather than "persons" (plural individuals).

Japanese also contains a large number of mimetic words formed by reduplication of a syllable. These words include not only onomatopoeia, but also words intended to invoke non-auditory senses or psychological states, such as きらきら kirakira (sparkling or shining). By one count, approximately 43% of Japanese mimetic words are formed by full reduplication, and many others are formed by partial reduplication, as in がささ〜 ga-sa-sa- (rustling) – compare English "a-ha-ha-ha".

=== Austronesian ===
Austronesian languages are known for their extensive use of reduplication in both nouns and verbs.

==== Malay (Indonesian and Malaysian) ====
In the Malay language, reduplication is a semi-productive process. It is used for expression of various grammatical functions (such as verbal aspect) and it is part in a number of complex morphological models. Simple reduplication of nouns and pronouns can express at least three meanings:

1. Diversity or non-exhaustive plurality:
  1. Burung-burung itu juga diekspor ke luar negeri = "All those birds are also exported out of the country".
2. Conceptual similarity:
  1. langit-langit = "ceiling; palate; etc." (langit = "sky")
  2. jari-jari = "spoke; bar; radius; etc." (jari = "finger" etc.)
3. Pragmatic accentuation:
  1. Saya bukan anak-anak lagi! "I am not a child anymore!" (anak = "child")

Reduplication of an adjective can express different things:

- Adverbialisation: Jangan bicara keras-keras! = "Don't speak loudly!" (keras = hard)
- Plurality of the corresponding noun: Rumah di sini besar-besar = "The houses here are big" (besar = "big").

Reduplication of a verb can express various things:

- Simple reduplication:
  - Pragmatic accentuation: Kenapa orang tidak datang-datang? = "Why aren't people coming?"
- Reduplication with me- prefixation, depending on the position of the prefix me-:
  - Repetition or continuation of the action: Orang itu memukul-mukul anaknya: "That man continuously beat his child";
  - Reciprocity: Kedua-dua orang itu pukul-memukul = "Those two men would beat each other".

Notice that in the first case, the nasalisation of the initial consonant (whereby /p/ becomes /m/) is repeated, while in the second case, it only applies in the repeated word.

==== Māori ====
The Māori language (New Zealand) uses reduplication in a number of ways.

Reduplication can convey a simple plural meaning, for instance wahine "woman", waahine "women", tangata "person", taangata "people". Biggs calls this "infixed reduplication". It occurs in a small subset of "people" words in most Polynesian languages.

Reduplication can convey emphasis or repetition, for example mate "die", matemate "die in numbers"; and de-emphasis, for example wera "hot" and werawera "warm".

Reduplication can also extend the meaning of a word; for instance paki "pat" becomes papaki "slap or clap once" and pakipaki "applaud"; kimo "blink" becomes kikimo "close eyes firmly". Nouns can also be formed this way – a good example are names of native New Zealand plants given in memory of tropical plants known by early arriving Polynesian settlers that they approximately resemble:

- kohekohe is named because its stems resemble the kohe bamboo (hence "bamboo-ish") in tropical islands,
- kawakawa (Piper excelsum) after the tropical kawa (Piper methysticum, hence the former conveying a "kawa-ish" meaning),
- several ferns known as piupiu (Parablechnum and others in their family) named after their fronds' shape resembling those of the piu palm or Pritchardia pacifica.

==== Mortlockese ====
The Mortlockese language is a Micronesian language spoken primarily on the Mortlock Islands. In the Mortlockese language, reduplication is used to show a habitual or imperfective aspect. For example, /jææjæ/ means "to use something" while the word /jæjjææjæ/ means "to use something habitually or repeatedly". Reduplication is also used in the Mortlockese Language to show extremity or extreme measures. One example of this can be seen in /ŋiimw alɛɛtɛj/ which means "hate him, her, or it". To mean "really hate him, her, or it," the phrase changes to /ŋii~mw al~mw alɛɛtɛj/.

==== Pingelapese ====
Pingelapese is a Micronesian language spoken on Pingelap Atoll and on Pohnpei, an island in the eastern Caroline Islands. Pingelapese utilizes both duplication and triplication of a verb or part of a verb to express that something is happening for certain duration of time. No reduplication means that something happens. A reduplicated verb means that something is happening, and a triplication means that something is still happening. For example, saeng means 'to cry' in Pingelapese. When reduplicated and triplicated, the duration of this verb is changed:

- saeng – cries
- saeng-saeng – is crying
- saeng-saeng-saeng – is still crying

Few languages employ triplication in their language. In Micronesia, Pingelapese is one of only two languages that uses triplication, the other being Mokilese. Reduplication and triplication are not to be confused with tense. In order to make a phrase past, present, or future tense, a temporal phrase must be used.

==== Rapa ====
Rapa is the French Polynesian language of the island of Rapa Iti. In terms of reduplication, the indigenous language known as Old Rapa uses reduplication consistent to other Polynesian languages. Reduplication of Old Rapa occurs in four ways: full, rightward, leftward, and medial. Full and rightward are generally more frequently used as opposed to the leftward and medial. Leftward and medial only occur as CV reduplication and partial leftward and medial usually denote emphasis.

Example of reduplication forms:

	Base form	Reduplicated form
Full reduplication	kini 'pinch'; kati 'bite'	kinikini 'pinch skin'; katikati 'nibble'
Rightward reduplication	māringi 'pour'; taka'uri 'go backward'; pātī 'bounce'; ngaru 'wave'	māringiringi 'pour continuously'; taka'uri'uri 'roll back and forth'; pātītī 'splash (of raindrops)'; ngaruru 'sea sick'
Leftward reduplication	komo 'sleep'; kume 'drag'	kokomo 'deep sleep'; kukume 'large, flat leaf seaweed'
Medial reduplication	maitaki 'good; well'	maitataki 'excellent; very well'

For the Rapa Language the implementation of reduplication has specific implications. The most evident of these are known as iterative, intensification, specification, diminutive, metaphorical, nominalizing, and adjectival.

Iterative:

- naku 'come, go' → nakunaku 'pass by frequently'
- ipuni 'hide' → ipunipuni 'hide and seek'

Intensification:

- mare 'cough' → maremare 'cough forcefully'
- roa 'much' → roroa 'very much'
- maki 'sick' → makimaki 'really sick'

Specification:

- kini 'to pinch' → kinikini 'pinch skin'

Diminutive:

- paki 'slap, strike' → pakipaki 'clap'
- kati 'bite' → katikati 'nibble'

Metaphorical (typically comparing an animal action with a human action):

- kapa 'mime with hands' → kapakapa 'flap wings (a bird)'
- mākuru 'detach oneself' → mākurukuru 'shed or molt'
- taŋi 'Yell' → taŋitaŋi 'chirp (a bird)'

Nominalizing:

- para 'finished' → parapara 'leftovers'
- Panga'a 'divide' → panaga'anga'a 'a break, a divide'

Adjectival:

- repo 'dirt, earth' → reporepo 'dirty'
- pake 'sun' → pakepake 'shining, bright'

==== Tagalog ====
Philippine languages are characterized as having the most productive use of reduplication, especially in Tagalog (the basis of the Filipino language). Reduplication in Tagalog is complex. It can be roughly divided into six types:

1. Monosyllabic; e.g. olol ("mad")
2. Reduplication of the final syllable; e.g. himaymay ("separate meat from bones"), from himay (same meaning)
3. Reduplication of the final syllable of a disyllabic word, where the added syllable is created from the first consonant of the first syllable and the last consonant of the second syllable; e.g. kaliskis ("[fish] scale"), from kalis ("to scrape")
4. Reduplication of the initial syllable of the root; e.g. susulat ("will write"), from sulat ("to write")
5. Full reduplication; e.g. araw-araw ("every day"), from araw ("day" or "sun")
6. Combined partial and full reduplication; e.g. babalibaligtad ("turning around continually", "tumbling"), from baligtad ("reverse")

They can further be divided into "non-significant" (where its significance is not apparent) and "significant" reduplication. 1, 2, and 3 are always non-significant; while 5 and 6 are always significant. 4 can be non-significant when used for nouns (e.g. lalaki, "man").

Full or partial reduplication among nouns and pronouns can indicate emphasis, intensity, plurality, or causation; as well as a diminutive, superlative, iterative, restrictive, or distributive force.

Adjectives and adverbs employ morphological reduplication for many different reasons such as number agreement when the adjective modifies a plural noun, intensification of the adjective or adverb, and sometimes because the prefix forces the adjective to have a reduplicated stem".

Number agreement for adjectives is entirely optional in Tagalog (e.g., a plural noun does not have to have a plural article marking it):

- "Ang magandang puno" "the beautiful tree".
- "Ang magagandang puno" "the beautiful trees".

The entire adjective is repeated for intensification of adjectives or adverbs:

- Magandang maganda ang kabayo "the horse is very pretty"

In verbs, reduplication of the root, prefix or infix is employed to convey different grammatical aspects. In "Mag- verbs" reduplication of the root after the prefix "mag-" or "nag-" changes the verb from the infinitive form, or perfective aspect, respectively, to the contemplated or imperfective aspect. Thus:

- magluto inf/actor trigger-cook "to cook" or "cook!" (imperative)
- nagluto actor trigger-cook "cooked"
- nagluluto actor trigger-reduplication-cook "cook" (as in "I cook all the time) or "is/was cooking"
- magluluto inf/actor trigger-rdplc-cook (contemplated) "will cook"

For ergative verbs (frequently referred to as "object focus" verbs) reduplication of part the infix and the stem occur:

- lutuin cook-inf/object trigger-cook "to cook"
- niluto object trigger infix-cook (perf-cook) "cooked"
- niluluto object trigger infix-reduplication-cook "cook"/"is/was cooking"
- lulutuin rdp-cook-object trigger "will cook".

The complete superlative prefix pagka- demands reduplication of the first syllable of the adjective's stem:

- "Ang pagkagagandang puno" "The most beautiful tree (and there are none more beautiful anywhere)"

==== Wuvulu-Aua ====
Reduplication is not a productive noun derivation process in Wuvulu-Aua as it is in other Austronesian languages. Some nouns exhibit reduplication, though they are considered to be fossilized.

Verb roots can undergo whole or partial reduplication to mark aspect. Actions that are continuous are indicated by a reduplicated initial syllable. A whole reduplication can also be used to indicate imperfective aspect.

- roni "to hurry"
- roroni "hurrying"
- rawani "good"
- rarawani "good" (continuous)
- ware "talk"
- wareware "talked" (durative)

The onomatopoeia in Wuvulu language also uses reduplication to describe the sound. These onomatopoeic words can be used as alienable nouns.

- "baʔa" or "baʔabaʔa" is a word for the sound of knocking.

=== Sino-Tibetan ===
==== Burmese ====
As in many Tibeto-Burman languages, in Burmese, reduplication is used in verbs and adjectives to form adverbs. Many Burmese words, especially adjectives such as လှပ ('beautiful' [l̥a̰pa̰]), which consist of two syllables (when reduplicated, each syllable is reduplicated separately), when reduplicated (လှပ → လှလှပပ 'beautifully' [l̥a̰l̥a̰ pa̰pa̰]) become adverbs. This is also true of many Burmese verbs, which become adverbs when reduplicated.

Some nouns are also reduplicated to indicate plurality. For instance, ပြည်, means "country," but when reduplicated to အပြည်ပြည်, it means "many countries" (as in အပြည်ပြည်ဆိုင်ရာ, "international"). Another example is အမျိုး, which means "kinds," but the reduplicated form အမျိုးမျိုး means "multiple kinds."

A few measure words can also be reduplicated to indicate "one or the other":

- ယောက် (measure word for people) → တစ်ယောက်ယောက် (someone)
- ခု (measure word for things) → တစ်ခုခု (something)

==== Chinese ====
Reduplication is sometimes employed in verbs and adjectives to enhance the effect of them.

- 帮帮忙 bāng bāng máng ('Please help!') is a reduplicated form of 帮忙 bāngmáng ('to help')
- 胖胖的 pàng pàng de ('quite fat') from 胖 pàng ('fat')

Similar to other Sino-Tibetan languages, adjectives form adverbs by reduplication.

- 漂漂亮亮 piào piào liàng liàng ('prettily') is a reduplicated form of 漂亮 piàoliàng ('pretty')

Other than verbs and adjectives, some nouns can be reduplicated to express plurality or a collection in Chinese.

- 人人 rén rén ('everyone') is derived from 人 rén ('person').
- 天天 tiān tiān ('every day') is derived from 天 tiān ('day').

=== Old Proto-Basque ===
One of the puzzles of Basque is the large number of words that begin with vowels in which the initial and second vowels are the same. Joseba Lakarra proposes that in Pre-Proto-Basque there was extensive reduplication and that later, certain initial consonants were deleted, leaving the VCV pattern of Proto-Basque:

Pre-Proto-Basque	Proto-Basque	Modern Basque	English
*dar → *da-dar	*adaR	adar	horn (anatomy)
*dats → *da-dats	*adats	adats	long hair
*der → *de-der	*edeR	eder	beautiful
*dol → *do-dol	*odoL	odol	blood
*gor → *go-gor	*gogoR	gogor	hard
*nal → *na-nal	*anaL	ahal	can, to be able
*nan → *na-nan	*anan-tz	ahantz	to forget
*nin → *ni-nin	*inin-tz	ihintz	dew
*nol → *no-nol	*onoL	ohol	board
*nur → *nu-nur	*unuR	hur	hazelnut
*zal → *za-zal	*azal	azal	bark
*zen → *ze-zen	*zezen	zezen	bull
*ten → *te-ten	*eten	eten	break
*ran → *ra-ran	*aran	aran	plum

== See also ==
- Ideophone
- Augment (Bantu languages)
- Augment (Indo-European)
- Amredita
- Language acquisition
- Siamese twins (linguistics)
- Syntactic doubling
- Motherese
- For an example of a language with many types of reduplication see St'at'imcets language.
- Contrastive focus reduplication
- Shm-reduplication
- Repetition (rhetorical device)
- Redundancy (linguistics)
- List of reduplicated place names
- Proto-Basque language

== Notes ==
=== References ===
- Abbi, Anvita (1992). Reduplication in South Asian languages. New Delhi: Allied Publishers.
- Botha, Rudolph P. (1984). "A Galilean Analysis of Afrikaans Reduplication". Stellenbosch Papers in Linguistics. 13. doi:10.5774/13-0-99.
- Biggs, Bruce (1998). Let's learn Maori: a guide to the study of the Maori language. Auckland University Press. ISBN 9781869401863.
- Botha, Rudi P. (1988). Form and meaning in word formation: a study of Afrikaans reduplication. Cambridge University Press.
- Butts, Aaron Michael (2011). "Reduplicated Nominal Patterns in Semitic". Journal of the American Oriental Society. 131 (1): 83–108. JSTOR 23044728.
- Corré, Alan D. (2005). "A Glossary of Lingua Franca". University of Wisconsin Milwaukee. Archived from the original on February 3, 2009.
- Czaykowska-Higgins, Ewa & Kinkade, M. Dale (1998). Salish Languages and Linguistics: Theoretical and Descriptive Perspectives. Berlin: Walter de Gruyter.
- Domigpe, J. & Nenita, D. (2012). Elementary Tagalog. Singapore: Tuttle Publishing.
- Downing, Laura J. (2001). Tone (Non-) Transfer in Bantu Verbal Reduplication. Typology of African Prosodic Systems Workshop. Bielefeld University, Germany – via ResearchGate.
- Emeneau, M. B. (1971). "Onomatopoetics in the Indian linguistic area". Language. 45 (2): 274–299. doi:10.2307/411660. JSTOR 411660.
- Gates, J. P. (2016). "Verbal Triplication Morphology in Stau (Mazi Dialect)". Transactions of the Philological Society. 115 (1): 14–26. doi:10.1111/1467-968X.12083.
- Ghomeshi, Jila; Jackendoff, Ray; Rosen, Nicole & Russell, Kevin (2004). "Contrastive focus reduplication in English (the Salad-Salad paper)". Natural Language & Linguistic Theory. 22 (2): 307–357. doi:10.1023/B:NALA.0000015789.98638.f9. JSTOR 4048061. S2CID 170949456.
- Gilbers (2009) [2008]. "Morfo(no)logie: Inleiding in de Morfologie (in relatie tot de Fonologie)" [Morpho(no)logy: Introduction to Morphology (in relation to Phonology)] (in Dutch). Faculty of Arts, University of Groningen. Archived from the original on July 8, 2013.
- Göksel, Asli & Kerslake, Celia (2005). Turkish: A Comprehensive Grammar. London: Routledge. Print.
- Hafford, James A (2015). Wuvulu Grammar and Vocabulary (PDF) (Thesis). Archived from the original (PDF) on 9 October 2022.
- Hattori, Ryoko (2012). Preverbal Particles in Pingelapese. Ann Arbor. ISBN 978-1-267-81721-1.
- Kiparsky, Paul (2010). "Reduplication in stratal OT". In Linda Uyechi; Lian-Hee Wee (eds.). Reality exploration and discovery: pattern interaction in language & life. Center for the Study of Language and Information.
- Kroonen, Guus (2013). Etymological Dictionary of Proto-Germanic. Leiden: Brill.
- Lande, Yury A. (27–29 June 2003). Nominal reduplication in Indonesian challenging the theory of grammatical change. International Symposium on Malay/Indonesian Linguistics. Nijmegen, The Netherlands.
- Leslau, Wolf (1995). Reference Grammar of Amharic. Wiesbaden: Harrassowitz.
- Lodhi, Abdulaziz Y. (2002). "Verbal extensions in Bantu (the case of Swahili and Nyamwezi)" (PDF). Africa & Asia (2). Department of Oriental and African Languages, Göteborg University: 4–26. Archived from the original (PDF) on December 11, 2009.
- "Morphological Exercises". Mount Allison University. Archived from the original on January 16, 2013.
- Nasu, Akio (2003). "Reduplicants and Prefixes in Japanese Onomatopoeia" (PDF). In Honma, Takeru; Okazaki, Masao; Tabata, Toshiyuki; Tanaka, Shinichi (eds.). A New Century of Phonology and Phonological Theory: A Festschrift for Professor Shosuke Haraguchi on the occasion of his sixtieth birthday. Tokyo: Kaitakusha. pp. 210–221.
- Odango, Emerson Lopez (2015). Affeu fangani 'join together': A morphophonemic analysis of possessive suffix paradigms and a discourse-based ethnography of the elicitation session in Pakin Lukunosh Mortlockese (PDF) (Thesis). Honolulu: University of Hawaii at Manoa. Archived from the original (PDF) on 2022-10-09.
- Omar, Asmah Haji (1989). "The Malay Spelling Reform" (PDF). Journal of the Simplified Spelling Society. 1989 (2): 9–13. Issue later designated J11.
- "fite fuaite". Pota Focal. Archived from the original on March 22, 2018.
- Pratt, George (1984) [1893]. A Grammar and Dictionary of the Samoan Language, with English and Samoan vocabulary (3rd and revised ed.). Papakura, New Zealand: R. McMillan. ISBN 978-0-908712-09-0.
- Rehg, Kenneth L. (1981). Ponapean reference grammar. Honolulu: The University Press of Hawaii.
- Smyth, Herbert Weir (1920). A Greek Grammar for Colleges. American Book Company – via Christian Classics Ethereal Library.
- "We gaan gaan gaan". Taal.vrt.be. December 10, 1999. Archived from the original on August 30, 2011.
- Tak, Jin-young (2016). "Second radical reduplication in Amharic: Optimality theory". Studies in Phonetics, Phonology and Morphology. 22 (1): 121–145. doi:10.17959/sppm.2016.22.1.121.
- Tamamura, Fumio (1979). "Nihongo to chuugokugo ni okeru onshoochoogo" [Sound-symbolic words in Japanese and Chinese]. Ootani Joshidai Kokubun. 9: 208–216.
- Tamamura, Fumio (1989). "Gokei" [Word forms]. In Tamamura, Fumio (ed.). Kooza nihongo to nihongo kyooiku. Vol. 6. Tokyo: Meiji Shoin. pp. 23–51.
- Unseth, Peter (2002). Biconsonantal reduplication in Amharic (Thesis). University of Texas at Arlington.
- Unseth, Peter (2003). "Surveying bi-consonantal reduplication in Semitic". In Bender, M. Lionel (ed.). Selected Comparative-Historical Afrasian Linguistic Studies in Memory of Igor M. Diakonoff. Munich: Lincom Europa. pp. 257–273.
- van der Walt, Elmarie (2002). "Bitter berry dawn Ingrid Jonker". University of Pretoria Faculty for Education. Archived from the original on August 4, 2013.
- Van Huyssteen, Gerhard B. (2004). "Motivating the composition of Afrikaans reduplications: a cognitive grammar analysis". In Radden, G.; Panther, K-U. (eds.). Studies in Linguistic Motivation. Berlin: Mouton de Gruyter. pp. 269–292. ISBN 978-3-11-018245-3.
- Van Huyssteen, Gerhard B & Wissing, Daan P. (2007). "Datagebaseerde Aspekte van Afrikaanse Reduplikasies" [Data-based Aspects of Afrikaans Reduplications]. Southern African Linguistics and Applied Language Studies (in Afrikaans). 25 (3): 419–439. doi:10.2989/16073610709486472. S2CID 147086852.
- Voinov, Vitaly (2012). "Rhyming reduplication in Russian paired words". Russian Linguistics. 36 (2): 175–191. doi:10.1007/s11185-012-9091-5. JSTOR 41679424. S2CID 169134304.
- Walworth, Mary E. (2015). The Language of Rapa Iti: Description of a Language In Change (Thesis). Honolulu: University of Hawaii at Manoa. Print.
- Wedel, Andrew (1999). "Turkish Emphatic Reduplication". Working Papers in Phonology at Santa Cruz.

== Bibliography ==
- Abraham, Roy. (1964). Somali-English dictionary. London, England: University of London Press.
- Albright, Adam. (2002). A restricted model of UR discovery: Evidence from Lakhota. (Draft version).
- Alderete, John; Benua, Laura; Gnanadesikan, Amalia E.; Beckman, Jill N.; McCarthy, John J.; Urbanczyk, Suzanne (1999). "Reduplication with fixed segmentism". Linguistic Inquiry. 30 (3): 327–364. CiteSeerX 10.1.1.387.3969. doi:10.1162/002438999554101. JSTOR 4179068. S2CID 53539427. Archived from the original on May 25, 2005.
- Broselow, Ellen; McCarthy, John J. (1984). "A theory of internal reduplication". The Linguistic Review. 3 (1): 25–88. doi:10.1515/tlir.1983.3.1.25. S2CID 170488926.
- Borbor, Dariush. (2023). Analytical Comparative Etymological Dictionary of Reduplication in the Major Languages of the Middle East and Iran. Contemporary Studies in Descriptive Linguistics (No. 55). Peter Lang. ISBN 978-1-80079-966-0.
- Cooper, William E. & Ross, "Háj" John R. (1975). "World order". In Grossman, R. E.; San, L. J. & Vance, T. J. (eds.). Papers from the parasession on functionalism. Chicago Linguistic Society. pp. 63–111.
- Dayley, Jon P. (1985). Tzutujil grammar. Berkeley, CA: University of California Press.
- Diffloth, Gérald. (1973). Expressives in Semai. In P. N. Jenner, L. C. Thompson, and S. Starsota (Eds.), Austroasiatic studies part I (pp. 249–264). University Press of Hawaii.
- Fabricius, Anne H. (2006). A comparative survey of reduplication in Australian languages. LINCOM Studies in Australian Languages (No. 03). Lincom. ISBN 3-89586-531-1.
- Gomez, Gale Goodwin, and Hein van der Voort, eds. Reduplication in indigenous languages of South America. Brill, 2014.
- Haeberlin, Herman (1918). "Types of Reduplication in Salish Dialects". International Journal of American Linguistics. 1 (2): 154–174. doi:10.1086/463719. JSTOR 1262824. S2CID 144246419.
- Haugen, Jason D. (forthcoming). Reduplicative allomorphy and language prehistory in Uto-Aztecan. (Paper presented at Graz Reduplication Conference 2002, November 3–6).
- Harlow, Ray. (2007) Māori: a linguistic introduction Cambridge University Press. ISBN 978-0-521-80861-3. 127–129
- Healey, Phyllis M. (1960). An Agta grammar. Manila: The Institute of National Language and The Summer Institute of Linguistics.
- Hurch, Bernhard (Ed.). (2005). Studies on reduplication. Empirical approaches to language typology (No. 28). Mouton de Gruyter. ISBN 3-11-018119-3.
- Ido, Shinji (2011). "Vowel alternation in disyllabic reduplicatives: An areal dimension". Eesti ja Soome-Ugri Keeleteaduse Ajakiri. 2 (1): 185–193. doi:10.12697/jeful.2011.2.1.12. hdl:2237/19169.
- Inkelas, Sharon; & Zoll, Cheryl. (2005). Reduplication: Doubling in morphology. Cambridge studies in linguistics (No. 106). Cambridge University Press. ISBN 0-521-80649-6.
- Key, Harold (1965). "Some semantic functions of reduplication in various languages". Anthropological Linguistics. 7 (3): 88–102. JSTOR 30022538.
- Kulkarni, Angha (August 5, 2013). "आई" [Come] (in Marathi). Maayboli.com. Archived from the original on March 14, 2016.
- Marantz, Alec. (1982). Re reduplication. Linguistic Inquiry 13: 435–482.
- McCarthy, John J. and Alan S. Prince. (1986 [1996]). Prosodic morphology 1986. Technical report #32. Rutgers University Center for Cognitive Science. (Unpublished revised version of the 1986 paper available online on McCarthy's website: http://ruccs.rutgers.edu/pub/papers/pm86all.pdf).
- McCarthy, John J.; and Prince, Alan S. (1995). Faithfulness and reduplicative identity. In J. Beckman, S. Urbanczyk, and L. W. Dickey (Eds.), University of Massachusetts occasional papers in linguistics 18: Papers in optimality theory (pp. 249–384). Amherst, MA: Graduate Linguistics Students Association. (Available online on the Rutgers Optimality Archive website: https://web.archive.org/web/20090423020041/http://roa.rutgers.edu/view.php3?id=568).
- McCarthy, John J.; and Prince, Alan S. (1999). Faithfulness and identity in prosodic morphology. In R. Kager, H. van der Hulst, and W. Zonneveld (Eds.), The prosody morphology interface (pp. 218–309). Cambridge: Cambridge University Press. (Available online on the Rutgers Optimality Archive website: https://web.archive.org/web/20050525032431/http://roa.rutgers.edu/view.php3?id=562).
- Moravcsik, Edith. (1978). Reduplicative constructions. In J. H. Greenberg (Ed.), Universals of human language: Word structure (Vol. 3, pp. 297–334). Stanford, CA: Stanford University Press.
- Nevins, Andrew & Vaux, Bert (2003). Metalinguistic, shmetalinguistic: The phonology of shm-reduplication. Chicago Linguistics Society, April 2003. Chicago Linguistics Society – via ling.auf.net.
- Oller, D. Kimbrough. 1980. The emergence of the sounds of speech in infancy, in Child Phonology Vol. I, edited by G. H. Yeni-Komshian, J. F. Kavanaugh, and C. A. Ferguson. Academic Press, New York. pp. 93–112.
- Raimy, Eric (2000). "Remarks on backcopying". Linguistic Inquiry. 31 (3): 541–552. doi:10.1162/002438900554433. JSTOR 4179117. S2CID 57569184.
- Reichard, Gladys A. (1959). "A comparison of five Salish languages: V". International Journal of American Linguistics. 25 (4): 239–253. doi:10.1086/464538. JSTOR 1263673. S2CID 224808110.
- Shaw, Patricia A. (1980). Theoretical Issues in Dakota Phonology and Morphology. Garland Publ: New York. pp. ix + 396.
- Shaw, Patricia A. (2004). Reduplicant order and identity: Never trust a Salish CVC either?. In D. Gerdts and L. Matthewson (Eds.), Studies in Salish linguistics in honor of M. Dale Kinkade. University of Montana Occasional Papers in Linguistics (Vol. 17). Missoula, MT: University of Montana.
- Stark, Rachel E. (1978). "Features of infant sounds: The emergence of cooing". Journal of Child Language. 5 (3): 379–390. doi:10.1017/S0305000900002051. PMID 701415. S2CID 39093455.
- Thun, Nils (1963). Reduplicative words in English: A study of formations of the types tick-tock, hurly-burly, and shilly-shally. Uppsala.
- Watters, David E. (2002). A grammar of Kham. Cambridge grammatical descriptions. Cambridge: Cambridge University Press. ISBN 0-521-81245-3.
- Wilbur, Ronnie B. (1973). The phonology of reduplication. Doctoral dissertation, University of Illinois. (Also published by Indiana University Linguistics Club in 1973, republished 1997.)
