= Hybrid word =

Word that etymologically derives from at least two languages

A hybrid word or hybridism is a word that etymologically derives from at least two languages. Such words may be considered a type of macaronic language.

== Common hybrids ==
The most common form of hybrid word in English combines Latin and Greek parts. Since many prefixes and suffixes in English are of Latin or Greek etymology, it is straightforward to add a prefix or suffix from one language to an English word that comes from a different language, thus creating a hybrid word.

Hybridisms were formerly often considered to be barbarisms.

== English examples ==
- Antacid – from Greek ἀντι- (anti-) 'against' and Latin acidus 'acid'; this term dates back to 1732.
- Antidepressant – from Greek "anti" and Latin "deprimere"
- Aquaphobia – from Latin aqua 'water' and Greek φοβία (phobia) 'fear'; this term is distinguished from the non-hybrid word hydrophobia, a historical term for rabies and one of its main symptoms.
- Asexual – from Greek prefix a- 'without' and the Latin sexus 'sex'
- Automobile – a wheeled passenger vehicle, from Greek αὐτός (autos) 'self' and Latin mobilis 'moveable'
- Beatnik – a 1950s counterculture movement centered on jazz music, coffeehouses, marijuana, and a literary movement, from English 'beat' and Russian -nik 'one who does'. The term was coined in 1958 by San Francisco newspaper columnist Herb Caen.
- Biathlon – from the Latin bis 'twice' and the Greek ἆθλον (athlon) 'contest'; the non-hybrid word is diathlon
- Bicycle – from Latin bis 'twice' and Greek κύκλος (kyklos) 'wheel'
- Bigamy – from Latin bis 'twice' and Greek γάμος (gamos) 'wedlock'; this term dates back to the 13th century.
- Bigram – from Latin bis 'twice' and Greek γράμμα (gramma); the non-hybrid word is digram
- Bioluminescence – from the Greek βίος (bios) 'life' and the Latin lumen 'light'
- Campanology – from Latin campana 'bell' and Greek -λογία (-logia) 'the study of'
- Chiral – from Greek χείρ (kheir) 'hand' and Latin adjectival suffix -ālis. The term was coined in 1894.
- Chloroform – from Greek χλωρός (khlōros) 'pale green' (indicating chlorine here) and Latin formica 'ant' (indicating formic acid here). The term first appeared in 1830s.
- Claustrophobia – from the Latin claustrum 'confined space' and Greek φόβος (phobos) 'fear'. This term was coined in 1879.
- Cryptocurrency – from the Greek κρυπτός (cryptos) 'hidden' and the Latin currens 'traversing'
- Democide – from the Greek δῆμος (dēmos) 'people' and the Latin -cida '-killer'
- Divalent – from Greek δύο (duo) 'two' and Latin valens 'strong'; the non-hybrid word is bivalent
- Dysfunction – from the Greek δυσ- (dys-) 'bad' and the Latin functio
- Eigenvalue– from German eigen 'own' and English of French origin 'value'.
- Electrocution – a portmanteau of electricity, from the Greek ἤλεκτρον (ēlektron), 'amber', and execution, from the Latin exsequi, 'follow out'
- Eusociality – from the Greek εὖ (eu) 'good' and the Latin socialitas
- Genocide – From the Greek γένος (genos) 'race, people' and the Latin cīdere 'to kill'
- Geostationary – From Greek γῆ (gē) 'Earth' and the Latin stationarius, from statio, from stare 'to stand'
- Heteronormative – from Greek ἕτερος (heteros) 'different' or 'other' and Latin nōrma (via French norme) 'norm'
- Heterosexual – from Greek ἕτερος (heteros) 'different' or 'other' and Latin sexus 'sex'
- Hexadecimal – from Greek ἕξ (hex), 'six', and Latin decimus 'tenth'; the non-hybrid word is sedecimal, from Latin sedecimalis
- Hexavalent – from Greek ἕξ (hex), 'six', and Latin valens, 'strong'
- Homosexual – from the Greek ὁμός (homos) 'same' and the Latin sexus 'sex' (This example is remarked on in Tom Stoppard's The Invention of Love, with A. E. Housman's character saying "Homosexuals? Who is responsible for this barbarity?... It's half Greek and half Latin!".)
- Hyperactive – from Greek ὑπέρ (hyper) 'over' and Latin activus
- Hypercomplex – from Greek ὑπέρ (hyper) 'over' and Latin complexus 'an embrace'
- Hypercorrection – from Greek ὑπέρ (hyper) 'over' and Latin correctio
- Hyperextension – from Greek ὑπέρ (hyper) 'over' and Latin extensio 'stretching out'; the non-hybrid word is superextension
- Hypervisor – from the Greek ὑπέρ (hyper) 'over' and the Latin visor 'seer'. This word is distinguished from the non-hybrid word supervisor, which is software that manages multiple user programs; a hypervisor is software that manages multiple virtual machines
- Liposuction – from the Greek λίπος (lipos) 'fat' and the Latin suctio 'sucking'
- Macroinstruction – from the Greek μακρος (makros) 'long' and the Latin instructio
- Mattergy – from the Latin materia ('material') and the Greek ἐνέργεια (energeia) 'energy': a "word for interchangeable matter and energy" Adjectival form: "matergetic".
- Mega-annum – from the Greek μέγας (megas) 'large', and the Latin annum 'year'
- Meritocracy – From the Latin meritus 'deserved' and the Greek -κρατία (-kratia) 'government'
- Metadata – from the Greek μετά (meta) and the Latin data 'given' from dare
- Microinstruction – from the Greek μικρός (mikros) 'small' and the Latin instructio
- Microcomputer – from the Greek μικρός (mikros) 'small' and the English computer, from Latin computare
- Microvitum – from the Greek μικρος (mikros) 'small' and the pseudo-Latin vitum, from vita 'life'
- Minneapolis – from the Dakota minne 'water' and the Greek πόλις (pólis) 'city'
- Monoculture – from the Greek μόνος (monos) 'one, single' and the Latin cultura
- Monolingual – from the Greek μόνος (monos) 'only' and the Latin lingua 'tongue'; the non-hybrid word is unilingual
- Multiethnic – from the Latin multus 'many' and the Greek ἔθνος (ethnos) 'group of people'; the non-hybrid word is polyethnic
- Multigraph – from the Latin multus 'many' and the Greek γραφή (graphē); the non-hybrid word would be polygraph, but that is generally used with a different meaning
- Neonate – from the Greek νέος (neos), 'new', and the Latin natus 'birth'
- Neuroscience – from the Greek νεῦρον (neuron) 'sinew', and the Latin scientia, from sciens 'having knowledge'
- Neurotransmitter – from the Greek νεῦρον (neuron) 'sinew', and the Latin trans 'across' and mittere 'to send'
- Nonagon – from the Latin nonus 'ninth' and the Greek γωνία (gōnia) 'angle'; the non-hybrid word is enneagon
- Oleomargarine – from the Latin oleum 'beef fat' and the Greek margarites 'pearl-like'
- Pandeism – from the Greek παν (pan) 'all' and Latin deus 'god'; compare with the non-hybrid word pantheism
- Periglacial – from the Greek περί (perí) and the Latin glaciālis
- Petroleum – from the Greek πέτρα (petra) 'rock', and the Latin oleum 'oil'
- Polyamory – from the Greek πολύς (polýs) 'many' and the Latin amor 'love'
- Polydeism – from the Greek πολύς (polýs) 'many' and the Latin deus 'god'; compare with the non-hybrid word polytheism
- Postsynaptic – from the Latin post and English synapse, derived from Greek σύναψις
- Psychosocial – from the Greek ψυχο- and Latin socius
- Quadraphonic – from the Latin quattuor meaning four and the Greek φωνικός (phōnikós), from φωνή (phōnḗ) meaning sound; the non-hybrid word is tetraphonic
- Quadriplegia – from the Latin quattuor 'four' and the Greek πληγή (plēgḗ) 'stroke', from πλήσσειν (plḗssein) 'to strike'; the non-hybrid word is tetraplegia
- Sociology – from the Latin socius, 'comrade', and the Greek λόγος (lógos) 'word', 'reason', 'discourse'
- Sociopath – from the Latin socius from sociare 'to associate with', and the Greek (-pathes) 'sufferer' from πάθος (páthos), 'incident, suffering, experience'
- Television – from the Greek τῆλε (tēle) 'far' and the Latin visio 'seeing', from videre 'to see'
- Tonsillectomy – from the Latin tonsillae 'tonsils' and the Greek εκτέμνειν (ektémnein), 'to cut out'
- Vexillology – from the Latin word vexillum, 'flag', and the Greek suffix -λογία (-logia), 'study'
- Vorarephilia from the Latin vorare (to eat) and Greek -philia (fondness)

== Other languages ==
=== Modern Hebrew ===
Modern Hebrew abounds with non-Semitic derivational affixes, which are applied to words of both Semitic and non-Semitic descent. The following hybrid words consist of a Hebrew-descent word and a non-Semitic descent suffix:

- bitkhon-íst (ביטחוניסט) 'one who evaluates everything from the perspective of national security', from bitakhón 'security' + the productive internationalism -ist
- khamúda-le (חמודה׳לה) 'cutie (feminine singular)', from khamuda 'cute (feminine singular) + -le, endearment diminutive of Yiddish origin
- kiso-lógya (כיסאולוגיה) 'the art of finding a political seat (especially in the Israeli Parliament)', from kisé 'seat' + the productive internationalism -lógya '-logy'
- maarav-izátsya (מערביזציה) 'westernization', from maaráv 'west' + the productive internationalism -izátsya '-ization' (itself via Russian from a hybrid of Greek -ιζ- -iz- and Latin -atio)
- miluím-nik (מילואימניק) 'reservist, reserve soldier', from miluím 'reserve' (literally 'fill-ins') + -nik, a most productive agent suffix of Yiddish and Russian descent

The following Modern Hebrew hybrid words have an international prefix:

- anti-hitnatkút (אנטי־התנתקות) 'anti-disengagement'
- post-milkhamtí (פוסט־מלחמתי) 'post-war'
- pro-araví (פרו־ערבי) 'pro-Arab'

Some hybrid words consist of both a non-Hebrew word and a non-Hebrew suffix of different origins:

- shababnik (שבבניק) 'rebel youth of Haredi Judaism', from Arabic shabab (youth) and -nik of Yiddish and Russian descent

Some hybrid words consist of a non-Hebrew word and a Hebrew suffix:

- Individuali-ut (אינדיבידואליות) 'Individualism', from English Individual and ut, a productive Hebrew suffix meaning -ism

Modern Hebrew also has a productive derogatory prefixal shm-, which results in an 'echoic expressive'. For example, um shmum (או״ם־שמו״ם), literally 'United Nations shm-United Nations', was a pejorative description by Israel's first Prime Minister, David Ben-Gurion, of the United Nations, called in Modern Hebrew umot meukhadot (אומות מאוחדות) and abbreviated um (או״ם). Thus, when a Hebrew speaker would like to express their impatience with or disdain for philosophy, they can say filosófya-shmilosófya (פילוסופיה־שמילוסופיה). Modern Hebrew shm- is traceable back to Yiddish, and is found in English as well as shm-reduplication. This is comparable to the Turkic initial m-segment conveying a sense of 'and so on' as in Turkish dergi mergi okumuyor, literally 'magazine "shmagazine" read:NEGATIVE:PRESENT:3rd.person.singular', i.e. '(He) doesn't read magazine, journals or anything like that'.

=== Filipino ===
In Filipino, hybrid words are called siyokoy (literally "merman"). For example, the word concernado ("concerned") has "concern-" come from English and "-ado" come from Spanish.

=== Japanese ===
In Japanese, hybrid words are common in kango (words formed from kanji characters) in which some of the characters may be pronounced using Chinese pronunciations (on'yomi, from Chinese morphemes), and others in the same word are pronounced using Japanese pronunciations (kun'yomi, from Japanese morphemes). These words are known as jūbako (重箱) or yutō (湯桶), which are themselves examples of this kind of compound (they are autological words): the first character of jūbako is read using on'yomi, the second kun'yomi, while it is the other way around with yutō. Other examples include 場所 basho "place" (kun-on), 金色 kin'iro "golden" (on-kun) and 合気道 aikidō "the martial art Aikido" (kun-on-on). Some hybrid words are neither jūbako nor yutō (縦中横 tatechūyoko (kun-on-kun)). Foreign words may also be hybridized with Chinese or Japanese readings in slang words such as 高層ビル kōsōbiru "high-rise building" (on-on-katakana) and 飯テロ meshitero "food terrorism" (kun-katakana).

== See also ==
- Classical compound
- International scientific vocabulary
- List of Greek and Latin roots in English
- Phono-semantic matching
- In Sino-Japanese vocabulary, hybrid words are called jūbako (重箱) or yutō (湯桶); see: Kanji § Other readings
