= Grammatical mood =

Grammatical feature of verbs

In linguistics, grammatical mood is a grammatical feature of verbs, used for signaling modality. In other words, it is the use of verbal inflections that allow speakers to express their attitude toward what they are saying (for example, a statement of fact, of desire, of command, etc.). The term is also used more broadly to describe the syntactic expression of modality – that is, the use of verb phrases that do not involve inflection of the verb itself.

Mood is distinct from grammatical tense or grammatical aspect, although the same word patterns are used for expressing more than one of these meanings at the same time in many languages, including English and most other modern Indo-European languages. (See tense–aspect–mood for a discussion of this.)

Some examples of moods are indicative, interrogative, imperative, subjunctive, injunctive, optative, and irrealis/potential. These are all finite forms of the verb. Infinitives, gerunds, and participles, which are non-finite forms of the verb, are not considered to be examples of moods.

Some Uralic Samoyedic languages have more than ten moods; Nenets has as many as sixteen. The original Indo-European inventory of moods consisted of indicative, subjunctive, optative, and imperative. Not every Indo-European language has all of these moods, but the most conservative ones such as Avestan, Ancient Greek, and Vedic Sanskrit have them all. English has indicative, imperative, conditional, and subjunctive moods.

Not all the moods listed below are clearly conceptually distinct. Individual terminology varies from language to language, and the coverage of, for example, the "conditional" mood in one language may largely overlap with that of the "hypothetical" or "potential" mood in another. Even when two different moods exist in the same language, their respective usages may blur, or may be defined by syntactic rather than semantic criteria. For example, the subjunctive and optative moods in Ancient Greek alternate syntactically in many subordinate clauses, depending on the tense of the main verb. The usage of the indicative, subjunctive, and jussive moods in Classical Arabic is almost completely controlled by syntactic context. The only possible alternation in the same context is between indicative and jussive following the negative particle lā.

The word mood in a grammatical sense comes from the Latin modus, and has no connection with the other meaning of "mood", in the sense of "emotional state", which comes from a Germanic root.

== Realis moods ==
Realis moods are a category of grammatical moods that indicate that something is actually the case. The most common realis mood is the indicative mood. Some languages have a distinct generic mood for expressing general truths.

=== Indicative ===
The indicative mood, or evidential mood, is used for factual statements and positive beliefs. It is the mood of reality. The indicative mood is the most commonly used mood and is found in all languages. Example: "Paul is eating an apple" or "John eats apples".

== Irrealis moods ==
Irrealis moods or non-indicative moods are the set of grammatical moods that indicate that something is not actually the case or a certain situation or action is not known to have happened. They are any verb or sentence mood that is not a realis mood. They may be part of expressions of necessity, possibility, requirement, wish or desire, fear, or as part of counterfactual reasoning, etc.

Irrealis verb forms are used when speaking of an event which has not happened, is not likely to happen, or is otherwise far removed from the real course of events. For example, in the sentence "If you had done your homework, you wouldn't have failed the class", had done is an irrealis verb form.

Some languages have distinct irrealis grammatical verb forms. Many Indo-European languages preserve a subjunctive mood. Some also preserve an optative mood that describes events that are wished for or hoped for but not factual.

Common irrealis moods are the conditional, the subjunctive, the optative, the jussive, and the potential. For other examples, see the main article for each respective mood.

=== Subjunctive ===
The subjunctive mood, sometimes called conjunctive mood, has several uses in dependent clauses. Examples include discussing imaginary or hypothetical events and situations, expressing opinions or emotions, or making polite requests (the exact scope is language-specific). A subjunctive mood exists in English, though it is not an inflectional form of the verb but rather a clause type which uses the bare form of the verb also used in imperatives, infinitives, and other constructions. An example of the English subjunctive is "Jill suggested that Paul take his medicine", as opposed to the indicative sentence "Jill believes that Paul takes his medicine".

Other uses of the subjunctive in English are archaisms, as in "And if he be not able to bring a lamb, then he shall bring for his trespass..." (KJV, Leviticus 5:7). Statements such as "I will ensure that he leave immediately" often sound archaic or formal, and have been largely supplanted by constructions with the indicative, like "I will ensure that he leaves immediately".

Some Germanic languages distinguish between two types of subjunctive moods, for example, the Konjunktiv I and II in German.

Subjunctive version of "John eats if he is hungry." (subjunctive part in bold)
Language	Sentence
**English**	John would eat if he **were** hungry.
**Danish**	Jan ville spise, hvis han **var** sulten.
**Dutch**	Jan zou eten, als hij honger **zou** hebben.
**French**^{1}	Jean mangerait s’il **avait** faim.
**German**	Johannes äße, wenn er hungrig **wäre**.
**Hindi**	जॉन खाता अगर उसे भूख **होती**। jôn khātā agar use bhūkh **hotī**.
**Assamese**	জনৰ ভোক লাগিলে খালে **হেঁতেন**। zônôr bhûk lagile khale **hẽten**.
**Irish**	D'íosfadh Seán dá **mbeadh** ocras air.
**Italian**	Giovanni mangerebbe se **avesse** fame.
**Lithuanian**	Jonas valgytų, jei **būtų** alkanas.
**Polish**	Jan jadłby, gdy**by zgłodniał**.
**Portuguese**	O João comeria se **tivesse** fome.
**Russian**	Иван поел бы, если **бы был** голоден.
**Spanish**	Juan comería si **tuviera** hambre.
**Swedish**	Johan skulle äta, om han **vore** hungrig.
**Slovenian**	Janez bi jedel, če **bi bil** lačen.
**Ukrainian**	Іван (по)їв би, як**би був** голодним. Ivan (po)jiv by, jak**by buv** holodnym.

^{1} In modern usage, the imperfect indicative usually replaces the imperfect subjunctive in this type of sentence.

The subjunctive mood figures prominently in the grammar of the Romance languages, which require this mood for certain types of dependent clauses. This point commonly causes difficulty for English speakers learning these languages.

In certain other languages, the dubitative or the conditional moods may be employed instead of the subjunctive in referring to doubtful or unlikely events (see the main article).

=== Conditional ===
The conditional mood is used for speaking of an event whose realization is dependent upon another condition, particularly, but not exclusively, in conditional sentences. In Modern English, this type of modality is expressed via a periphrastic construction, with the form would + infinitive, (for example, I would buy), and thus is a mood only in the broad sense and not in the more common narrow sense of the term "mood" requiring morphological changes in the verb. In other languages, verbs have a specific conditional inflection. In German, the conditional mood is identical to one of the two subjunctive moods (Konjunktiv II, see above).

Conditional version of "John eats if he is hungry." (conditional part in bold)
English	John **would eat** if he were hungry.
Basque	Jonek **jango luke**, goserik balu.
Estonian	Juhan **sööks**, kui tal **oleks** nälg
Finnish	Juha **söisi**, jos hänellä **olisi** nälkä
French	Jean **mangerait** s'il avait faim.
German	Johannes **äße**, wenn er hungrig wäre. Also: Johannes **würde essen**, wenn er hungrig wäre.
Hindi	जॉन **खाता** अगर उसे भूख होती। jôn **khātā** agar usē bhūkh hotī.
Irish	**D'íosfadh** Seán dá mbeadh ocras air.
Italian	Giovanni **mangerebbe** se avesse fame.
Lithuanian	Jonas **valgytų**, jei būtų alkanas.
Polish	Jan **jadłby**, gdyby zgłodniał.
Portuguese	João **comeria** se estivesse com fome.
Russian	Иван **поел бы**, если бы был голоден.
Spanish	Juan **comería** si tuviera hambre.
Swedish	Johan **skulle äta**, om han vore hungrig.
Ukrainian	Іван **(по)їв би**, якби був голодним. Ivan **(po)jiv by**, jakby buv holodnym.

In the Romance languages, the conditional form is used primarily in the apodosis (main clause) of conditional sentences, and in a few set phrases where it expresses courtesy or doubt. The main verb in the protasis (dependent clause) is usually in the subjunctive or in the indicative mood. However, this is not a universal trait and among others in German (as above), Finnish, and Romanian (even though the last is a Romance language), the conditional mood is used in both the apodosis and the protasis. A further example is a sentence "I would buy a house if I earned a lot of money".

- Irish has conditional marking in both clauses: d'íosfadh 'would eat, would have eaten' and beadh 'would be, would have been', along with a specific irrealis conditional dá 'if', which contrasts with the realis conditional má 'if' (i.e. **Ithfidh** sé má **bhíonn** ocras air. 'He'll eat if he is hungry').
- In Finnish, both clauses likewise have the conditional marker -isi-: Osta**isi**n talon, jos ansaits**isi**n paljon rahaa.
- In Polish (as well as in eastern and other western Slavic languages), the conditional marker -by also appears twice: Kupił**by**m dom, gdy**by**m zarabiał dużo pieniędzy.
- In Hindi, the conditional markers -ता (tā), -ती (tī), -ते (te) and -तीं (tī̃) (agreeing in gender and number with the subject and the direct object) comes twice: मैं घर खरीद**ता** अगर बहौत पैसे कमा**ता**। (maiṁ ghar kharīda**tā** agar bahaut paisē kamā**tā**). The conditional (or contrafactual) form in Hindi corresponds to perfect conditional of Romance and the Germanic languages. So, the sentence literally translate to "I **would have** bought a house if I **earned** a lot of money."

Due to English's status as a lingua franca, a common error among second-language speakers is to use "would" in both clauses. For example, *"I would buy if I would earn...". In Dutch, for instance, inserting zouden "would" in the if-clause is not considered grammatically incorrect: ik zou een huis hebben gekocht, als ik veel geld zou verdienen.

=== Optative ===
The optative mood expresses hopes, wishes or commands and has other uses that may overlap with the subjunctive mood. Few languages have an optative as a distinct mood; some that do are Albanian, Ancient Greek, Hungarian, Kazakh, Japanese, Finnish, Nepali, and Sanskrit.

=== Imperative ===
The imperative mood expresses direct commands, prohibitions, and requests. In many circumstances, using the imperative mood may sound blunt or even rude, so it is often used with care. Example: "Pat, do your homework now". An imperative is used for telling someone to do something without argument. Many languages, including English, use the bare verb stem to form the imperative (such as "go", "run", "do"). Other languages, such as Seri, Hindi, and Latin, however, use special imperative forms.

- In English, the second person is implied by the imperative except when first-person plural is specified, as in "Let's go" ("Let us go").
- In Romance languages, a first person plural exists in the imperative mood: Spanish: Vayamos a la playa; French: Allons à la plage (both meaning: Let's go to the beach).
- In Hindi, imperatives can be put into the present and the future tense. Imperative forms of Hindi verb karnā (to do) are shown in the table belowː

2nd Person	Formality		Present	Future
2nd Person	Intimate	tū	kar	kar**iyo**
2nd Person	Familiar	tum	kar**o**	kar**nā**
2nd Person	Formal	āp	kar**iye**	kar**iyegā**

The prohibitive mood, the negative imperative, may be grammatically or morphologically different from the imperative mood in some languages. It indicates that the action of the verb is not permitted. For example, "Don't you go!"

In English, the imperative is sometimes used for forming a conditional sentence: for example, "go eastwards a mile, and you'll see it" means "if you go eastwards a mile, you will see it".

Imperative version of "John does his homework."
English	John, **do** your homework!
French	Jean, **fais** tes devoirs !
German	Johannes, **mach** deine Hausaufgaben!
Portuguese	João, **faz** os teus deveres!
Lithuanian	Jonai, **daryk** savo namų darbus!
Russian	Иван, **делай** домашнее задание!
Spanish	¡Juan, **haz** tu tarea!
Ukrainian	Іване, **роби** домашнє завдання!. Ivane, **roby** domašnie zavdannia.

=== Jussive ===
The jussive, similarly to the imperative, expresses orders, commands, exhortations, but particularly to a third person not present. An imperative, in contrast, generally applies to the listener. When a language is said to have a jussive, the jussive forms are different from the imperative ones, but may be the same as the forms called "subjunctive" in that language. Latin and Hindi are examples of where the jussive is simply about certain specific uses of the subjunctive. Arabic, however, is a language with distinct subjunctive, imperative, and jussive conjugations.

=== Potential ===
The potential mood is a mood of probability indicating that, in the opinion of the speaker, the action or occurrence is considered likely. It is used in Finnish, in Japanese, in Sanskrit (where the so-called optative mood can serve equally well as a potential mood), in Northern Wu, and in the Sami languages. (In Japanese, it is often called something like tentative, since potential is used for referring to a voice indicating capability to perform the action.)

In Finnish, it is mostly a literary device, as it has virtually disappeared from daily spoken language in most dialects. Its affix is -ne-, as in *men + ne + e → mennee "(he/she/it/they(sg)) will probably go".

In Hungarian, the potential is formed by the suffix -hat/-het and it can express both possibility and permission: adhat "may give, can give"; Mehetünk? "Can we go?"

In English, it is formed by means of the auxiliaries may, can, ought, and must: "She may go."

=== Presumptive ===
The presumptive mood is used to express presupposition or hypothesis, regardless of the fact denoted by the verb, as well as other more or less similar attitudes: doubt, curiosity, concern, condition, indifference, and inevitability. It is used in Romanian, Hindi, Gujarati, and Punjabi.

In Romanian, the presumptive mood conjugations of the verb vrea are used with the infinitive form of verbs. The present tense and the past tense infinitives are respectively used to form the present and the past tense of the presumptive mood.

In Hindi, the presumptive mood conjugations of the verb honā (to be) are used with the perfective, habitual, and progressive aspectual participles to form the perfective presumptive, habitual presumptive, and the progressive presumptive moods. The same presumptive mood conjugations are used for present, future, and past tenses.

Presumptive Mood Conjugations
Person		Singular			Plural		
Person		1st	2nd	3rd	1st	2nd	3rd
Romanian		oi		o	om	oți	or
Hindi	♂	hūṁgā	hogā		hoṁgē	hogē	hoṁgē
Hindi	♀	hūṁgī	hogī		hoṁgī	hogī	hoṁgī

	Tense		Sentence	Translation
Romanian	Present		tu oi face	You might do.
Romanian	Past		tu oi fi făcut	You might have done.
Romanian	Progressive		tu oi fi făcând	You might be doing.
	Aspect	Tense	Sentence	Translation
Hindi	Habitual	Present	tū kartā hoga abhī	You must/might be doing it now.
Hindi	Habitual	Past	tū kartā hogā pêhlē.	You must/might have done it before (habitually in the past).
Hindi	Perfective	Present	tūnē kiyā hogā abhī.	You must/might have done now.
Hindi	Perfective	Past	tūnē kiyā hogā pêhlē.	You must/might have done it before (in the past).
Hindi	Progressive	Present	tū kar rahā hogā abhī	You must/might be doing it now.
Hindi	Progressive	Past	tū kar rahā hogā do din pêhlē	You must/might have been doing it two days ago.
Hindi	Progressive	Future	tū kar rahā hogā do din bād	You must/might be doing it two days from now.

Note:

1. The translations are just the closest possible English approximations and not exact.
2. Only masculine conjugations are shown for Hindi.

=== Hypothetical ===
A few languages use a hypothetical mood, which is used in sentences such as "you could have gone", representing something that might have happened but did not.

=== Inferential ===
The inferential mood is used to report unwitnessed events without confirming them. Often, there is no doubt as to the veracity of the statement (for example, if it were on the news), but simply the fact that the speaker was not personally present at the event forces them to use this mood.

In the Balkan languages, the same forms used for the inferential mood also function as admiratives. When referring to Balkan languages, it is often called renarrative mood; when referring to Estonian, it is called oblique mood.

The inferential is usually impossible to be distinguishably translated into English. For instance, indicative Bulgarian той отиде (toy otide) and Turkish o gitti will be translated the same as inferential той отишъл (toy otishal) and o gitmiş — with the English indicative he went.^{[1]} Using the first pair, however, implies very strongly that the speaker either witnessed the event or is very sure that it took place. The second pair implies either that the speaker did not in fact witness it take place, that it occurred in the remote past or that there is considerable doubt as to whether it actually happened. If it were necessary to make the distinction, then the English constructions "he must have gone" or "he is said to have gone" would partly translate the inferential.

=== Interrogative ===
The interrogative (or interrogatory) mood is used for asking questions. Most languages do not have a special mood for asking questions, but exceptions include Welsh, Nenets, and Eskimo languages such as Greenlandic.

=== Deontic mood vs. epistemic mood ===
Linguists also differentiate moods into two parental irrealis categories: deontic mood and epistemic mood. Deontic mood describes whether one could or should be able to do something. An example of deontic mood is: She should/may start. On the other hand, epistemic mood describes the chance or possibility of something happening. This would then change our example to: She may have started. To further explain modality, linguists introduce weak mood. A weak deontic mood describes how a course of action is not recommended or is frowned upon. A weak epistemic mood includes the terms "perhaps" and "possibly".

== Moods in Oceanic languages ==
=== Pingelapese ===
Pingelapese is a Micronesian language spoken on Pingelap Atoll and on Pohnpei, an island in the eastern Caroline Islands. The auxiliary verbs e and ae are found in Pingelapese and, though seemingly interchangeable, are distinct particles with different uses. The particle e is used when expressing high certainty and ae when expressing lower certainty. These function as evidential markers, shaping the epistemic tone of a sentence without affecting its direct translation into English. The following example illustrates the difference between e and ae when applied in the same sentence:

Ngaei rong pwa Soahn e laid.
1S.SUB hear that John HEV fish
"I heard because John was fishing (and I am certain about it)."

Ngaei rong pwa Soahn ae laid.
1S.SUB hear that John LEV fish
"I heard that John was fishing (but I am not certain about it)."

The particle ae can also be used to form interrogative sentences. This follows from its evidential function; in the same way as it marks a statement as uncertain, it can extend to questioning the truth of a proposition entirely. The following sentence is an example:

Soahn ae laid?
John LEV fish
"Does John fish?"

=== Reo Rapa ===
The language we know as Reo Rapa was created as a result of the introduction of Tahitian to the Rapa monolingual community. Old Rapa words are still used for the grammar and structure of the sentence or phrase, but most common content words were replaced with Tahitian. The Reo Rapa language uses Tense–Aspect–Mood (TAM) in their sentence structure such as the imperfective TAM marker /e/ and the imperative TAM marker /a/.

For example:

e hina’aro na vau tō mei’a ra
IPFV.TAM like DEIX SG DEF banana DEIX
'I would like those bananas (you mentioned).'

=== Mortlockese ===
Mortlockese is an Austronesian language made up of eleven dialects over the eleven atolls that make up the Mortlock Islands in Micronesia. Various TAM markers are used in the language. Mood markers include the past tense hortative (marking encouragement or to urge) aa, the hortative kɞ which denotes a polite tone, min or tin to stress the importance of something, and the word tɞ to denote warning or caution. Each of these markers is used in conjunction with the subject proclitics except for the aa marker.

== See also ==
- Articles on specific grammatical moods
- Grammatical conjugation
- Grammatical modality
- Polarity item
- Nominal TAM
