= K: A History of Baseball in Ten Pitches =

2019 book by Tyler Kepner

- Author: Tyler Kepner
- Language: English
- Subject: Baseball; Pitching
- Publisher: Doubleday
- Publication date: April 2, 2019
- Pages: 320
- ISBN: 9780385541015

K: A History of Baseball in Ten Pitches is a 2019 book by The New York Times sportswriter Tyler Kepner that examines the history of baseball through an examination of ten pitches widely used throughout the game's history.

== Synopsis ==
The book recounts the history of baseball through anecdotes about iconic pitches and interviews with pitchers such as Hall of Famers Steve Carlton, Bob Gibson and Nolan Ryan, as well as pitchers like Jamie Moyer and J.R. Richard. It also describes the mechanics of pitching, and its centrality to the game of baseball.

The book is divided into ten chapters, each one discusses a type of pitch. The pitches discussed in the book are: fastball, curveball, slider, changeup, knuckleball, splitter, cutter, screwball, sinker, and spitball.

== Reception ==
The book was generally received, with praise for its humor and analysis of the sport. Baseball writer Paul Dickson wrote that the book was "well-written, anecdote rich and filled with seldom-shared insights by players."

Publishers Weekly reviewed the book as: "Using interviews and extensive research, Kepner not only discovers the origins and evolutions of these and other pitches, like the curveball...knuckleball, and spitball, but he also shines a microscope on how pitches captured championships or ended lives ... Kepner puts a new spin on baseball’s history that will have even the most avid fans entertained as they learn something new in each chapter."

Other reviews were less positive, praising the research but calling the book too complex. Steven V. Roberts in a review for The Washington Post wrote that it "lacks a compelling narrative and well-developed characters" and would not appeal to casual fans of the sport. Harry Levins of the St. Louis Post-Dispatch said the book was too complex to be considered a "light read": "Trouble is, this book throws more insider stuff than the average baseball fan will care to deal with. Kepner goes into minute detail on such arcane matters as the placement of which finger goes where on the ball, and which way the ball's seams ought to face... K strikes out as entertaining reading."
