= Tyler Kepner =

American sportswriter (born 1975)

- Born: 1975 (age 50–51); Philadelphia, Pennsylvania, U.S.
- Education: Vanderbilt University
- Occupations: Author; sports journalist

John Tyler Kepner (born 1975) is an American author and sports journalist who is currently a senior baseball writer for The Athletic, after spending more than 23 years writing baseball for The New York Times.

== Early life ==
Kepner was born in Philadelphia and attended Germantown Academy and Vanderbilt University. He became interested in baseball as a child, and created a monthly baseball magazine as a teenager. While in high school, he received a press pass to cover the Philadelphia Phillies. In 1989, he was featured in Sports Illustrated Kids and The New York Times.

== Writing ==
While in college, Kepner interned for The Boston Globe and The Washington Post. He was hired by The Press-Enterprise as Angels beat writer in September 1997. He joined the Seattle Post-Intelligencer as Mariners beat writer in September 1998 and began writing for The New York Times in 2000. After two years as a Mets beat writer and eight as a Yankees beat writer, he became the newspaper's national baseball writer in 2010, moving on to The Athletic as a senior national baseball writer in September 2023.

In 2019, he published his first book K: A History of Baseball in Ten Pitches. The book received mostly positive reviews from critics, and was praised for its writing style and informativeness. Paul Dickson of The Washington Post called it "well-written, anecdote rich and filled with seldom-shared insights by players." Kirkus Reviews wrote that it "belongs in the first ranks of books on America's most written-about sport."

Kepner published his second book, The Grandest Stage: A History of the World Series, in 2022. The book chronicles the history of the World Series and received critical praise. Olive Fellows, writing for Christian Science Monitor, called it "quirky and engrossing." Richard Crepeau, in a review for the New York Journal of Books, praised the book for its nuanced overview of history.

== Bibliography ==
- K: A History of Baseball in Ten Pitches (2019)
- The Grandest Stage: A History of the World Series (2022)
