= Indosphere =

Geolinguistic region sharing areal features of Asia

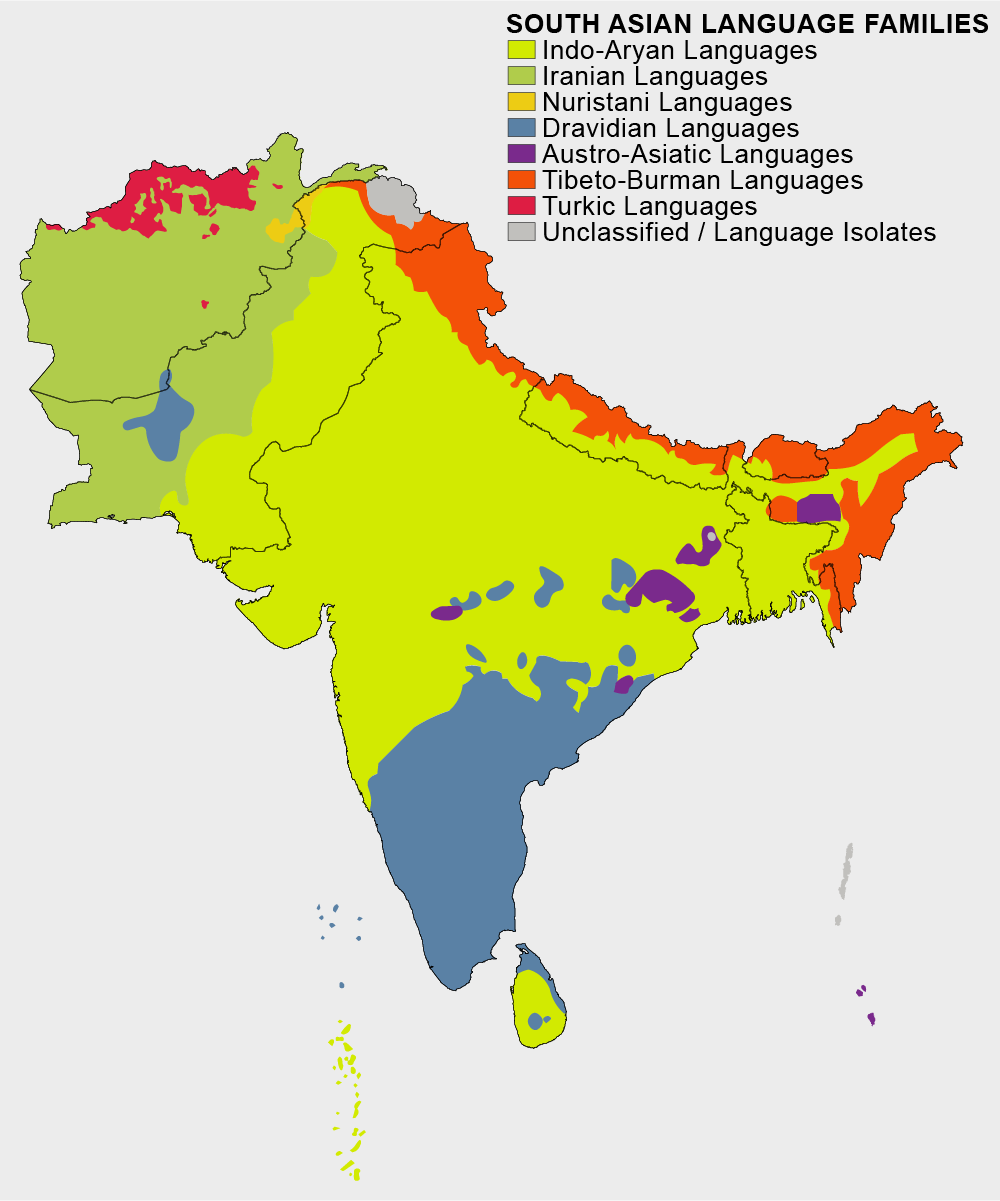
Language families of South Asia

Indosphere (also known as the South Asia linguistic area, South Asian linguistic area, or the South Asian sprachbund) is a term used to describe the South Asian sprachbund which encompasses the native languages of the Indian subcontinent, including languages from the Indo-European, Dravidian, Austroasiatic, Tibeto-Burman language families, and three language isolates Burushaski, Nihali, and Kusunda.

Although these language families are unrelated, areal convergences due to long-term intense contact have led to the rise of several typological features commonly shared across the region. These features are: left-branching (morpho)syntax; finiteness asymmetries in predicate; phonological distinctions between dental vs. retroflex consonants, aspirated vs. non-aspirated consonants, and nasalized vs. non-nasalized vowels; simple onsets; echo word formation; the uses of dative experiencer subjects and explicator verbs (v2).

It is commonly used in areal linguistics in contrast with the languages of the Mainland Southeast Asia linguistic area, also known as the Sinosphere.

== Influence ==
The Tibeto-Burman family of languages, which extends over a huge geographic range, is characterized by great typological diversity, comprising languages that range from the highly tonal, monosyllabic, analytic type with practically no affixational morphology, like the Loloish languages, to marginally tonal or atonal languages with complex systems of verbal agreement morphology, like the Kiranti group of Nepal. This diversity is partly to be explained in terms of areal influences from Chinese on the one hand and Indo-Aryan languages on the other. Matisoff proposed two large and overlapping areas combining cultural and linguistic features – the "Sinosphere" and the "Indosphere", influenced by China and India respectively. A buffer zone between them as a third group was proposed by Kristine A. Hildebrandt, followed by B. Bickel and J. Nichols. The Indosphere is dominated by Indic languages.

Some languages firmly belong to one or the other. For example, the Munda and Khasian (Note: While Matisoff (1991) mentions the Khasi branches [...] as typologically Indospheric, it was likely an over-glossing, in contrast to Ring (2026), who demonstrates that "Typologically, Khasian languages have some affinity to South Asia but more affinity to Southeast Asia.") branches of Austroasiatic languages, the Tibeto-Burman languages of Eastern Nepal, and much of the "Kamarupan" group of Tibeto-Burman, which most notably includes the Meitei (Manipuri), are Indospheric; while the Hmong–Mien family, the Kam–Sui branch of Kadai, the Loloish branch of Tibeto-Burman, and Vietnamese (Viet–Muong) are Sinospheric. Some other languages, like Thai and Tibetan, have been influenced by both Chinese and Indian languages at different historical periods. Still, other linguistic communities are so remote geographically that they have escaped significant influence from either. For example, the Aslian branch of Mon–Khmer in Malaya, or the Nicobarese branch of Mon–Khmer in the Nicobar Islands of the Indian Ocean shows little influence by Sinosphere or Indosphere. The Bodish languages and Kham languages are characterized by hybrid prosodic properties akin to related Indospheric languages towards the west and also Sinospheric languages towards the east. Some languages of the Kiranti group in the Indosphere rank among the morphologically most complex languages of Asia.

Indian cultural, intellectual, and political influence – especially that of Pallava writing system – began to penetrate both insular and peninsular Southeast Asia about 2000 years ago. Indic writing systems were adopted first by Austronesians, like Javanese and Cham, and Austroasiatics, like Khmer and Mon, then by Tai (Siamese and Lao) and Tibeto-Burmans (Pyu, Burmese, and Karen). Indospheric languages are also found in Mainland Southeast Asia (MSEA), defined as the region encompassing Laos, Cambodia, and Thailand, as well as parts of Burma, Peninsular Malaysia and Vietnam. Related scripts are also found in South East Asian islands ranging from Sumatra, Java, Bali, south Sulawesi and most of the Philippines. The learned components of the vocabularies of Khmer, Mon, Burmese and Thai/Lao consist of words of Pali or Sanskrit origin. Indian influence also spread north to the Himalayan region. Tibetan has used Ranjana writing since 600 AD, but has preferred to calque new religious and technical vocabulary from native morphemes rather than borrowing Indian ones. The Cham states, known collectively as Champa, which were founded around the end of 2nd century AD, belonged directly to the influence of Greater India, rather than to the Sinosphere which shaped so much of Vietnamese culture and by which Chams were influenced later and indirectly.

== Features ==
Languages in the "Sinosphere" (East Asia and Vietnam) tend to be analytic, with little morphology, monosyllabic or sesquisyllabic lexical structures, extensive compounding, complex tonal systems, and serial verb constructions. Languages in the "Indosphere" (South Asia and Southeast Asia) tend to be more agglutinative, with polysyllabic structures, extensive case and verb morphology, and detailed markings of interpropositional relationships. Manange (like other Tamangic languages) is an interesting case to examine in this regard, as geographically it fits squarely in the "Indospheric" Himalayas, but typologically it shares more features with the "Sinospheric" languages. Tibeto-Burman languages spoken in the Sinosphere tend to be more isolating, while those spoken in the Indosphere tend to be more morphologically complex.

Many languages in the western side of the Sino-Tibetan family, which includes the Tibeto-Burman languages, show significant typological resemblances with other languages of South Asia, which puts them in the group of Indosphere. They often have heavier syllables than found in the east, while tone systems, though attested, are not as frequent. Indospheric languages are often toneless and/or highly suffixal. Often there is considerable inflectional morphology, from fully developed case marking systems to extensive pronominal morphology found on the verb. These languages generally mark a number of types of inter-clausal relationships and have distinct construction involving verbal auxiliaries. Languages of the Indosphere typically display retroflex stop consonants, postsentential relative clauses and the extended grammaticalization of the verb say. In Indospheric languages, such as the Tibeto-Burman languages of Northeast India and Nepal, for example, the development of relative pronouns and correlative structures as well as of retroflex initial consonants is often found.

In the state of Jharkhand as well as neighboring states of Bihar, West Bengal, Odisha, and Bangladesh, regional areal convergences take shape between Indo-Aryan, Munda, and North Dravidian languages under subcontinental linguistic convergences due to intense language contact. These languages in this region share many similar features such as lack of gender word classes, absence of ergativity, and the use of numeral classifiers.

Echo word. A notable feature of the South Asian sprachbund is the phenomenon of "echo words", in which a lexical word is followed by a phonological-similar element which has no independent meaning, generally expressing something similar to the English "etc".

- Hindi: ʈhiːk ʈhaːk 'good and well; completely OK'
- Punjabi: khaːɳaː khuːɳaː 'food and the like'
- Burushaski: t͡ɕhil mil 'water etc'
- Kharia: culha cawka 'stove etc'

Left-branching and head-final syntax. Except the Khasian and Tai languages in Northeast India which generally have SVO word order, the languages of South Asia are consistently verb-final.

Brahui, North Dravidian, Balochistan:

fawʒ-ana ban-niŋ-an must peʃ tamm-o-su-re, numa mal hin-ta-wa-ka
army-GEN.SG arrive-PTCP-ABL before forth set-PRF-COND-2PL your property go.away-NEG-IPFV.PST-3SG
'If you had set forth before the arrival of the army, your property would not have been lost.'

Chepang, Tibeto-Burman, Nepal:

ŋaŋ=ko kwi=i o=kaj dʑʌjk=bʌt=ka=tʰʌ=i
2SG=GEN dog=ERG that=DAT bite=PIP=2/3.PST=INV=3>3SG
'Your dog bit him/her!'

Khortha, Indo-Aryan, Jharkhand:

mʌŋru=ẽ tʃhagʌir=ʈi=ke budhwa=ke betʃh-l-ʌi
Mangru=ERG goat=CLF=OBL Budhwa=OBL sell-PST-3SG
'Mangru sold the goat to Budhwa.'

Nepali, Indo-Aryan:

mer-o ramr-o keto nepali bolcha
my-M beautiful-M boy Nepali speak.PRES.3SG.M
'My handsome boyfriend speaks Nepali.'

Sora, Munda, Odisha:

anin dɔŋ=ɲɛn darəj-ən ə-tij-ben idsɨm-tɛ-ted
S/he OBL=me rice-NSFX INF-give-INF want-NPST-3.NEG
'S/he doesn't want to give me the rice.'

== See also ==
- East Indies
- Greater India
- Indianisation
- Geolinguistics
- List of languages of India
- Languages of Bhutan
- Languages of Nepal
- Languages of Bangladesh
- Languages of Pakistan
- Languages of India
- Languages of Sri Lanka
- List of countries and territories where Hindustani is an official language
- List of countries and territories where Tamil is an official language
- Sanskritisation (linguistics)
- Indian honorifics
- History of Indian influence on Southeast Asia
- Language geography
- Sinosphere
