= The Grandest Stage =

2022 book by Tyler Kepner

The Grandest Stage: A History of the World Series
- Author: Tyler Kepner
- Language: English
- Subject: World Series
- Publisher: Doubleday
- Publication date: October 11, 2022
- Pages: 336
- ISBN: 978-0385546256

The Grandest Stage: A History of the World Series is a 2022 book by The New York Times sportswriter Tyler Kepner which examines the history of the World Series, the championship series which is held at the end of each Major League Baseball season and is considered the most prestigious event in baseball.

== Synopsis ==
The book is divided into seven chapters, each of which are titled "Game", in reference to a full-length World Series.

Kepner discusses individual plays and memorable games; examples include: Willie Mays' catch in Game 1 of the 1954 series and Babe Ruth's called shot in the '32 series against the Chicago Cubs. He also discusses lesser known players and performances.

Chapters

- "Game One": discusses the concept of "clutch performances" and the World Series heroics of players such as Reggie Jackson.
- "Game Two": notable events such as the Black Sox scandal are discussed.
- "Game Three": Kepner discusses unlikely heroes of the World Series such as Larry Sherry in the 1959 World Series or Ron Swoboda's catch in Game 4 of the 1969 World Series.
- "Game Four": discusses managers and their rolls in the World Series.
- "Game Five": focuses on general managers whom Kepner describes as "architects" of championship teams. Also discussed are "dynasties" and the impact of expanded playoffs in Major League Baseball.
- "Game Six": the chapter focuses of so-called "goats", i.e. a player who made an error of mistake which potentially cost the team a win or the Series.
- "Game Seven": a variety of topics are discussed, such as the broadcasts of Vin Scully, the best performers in World Series play, memorable moments, and the author's personal favorite aspects of the event.

== Reception ==
Olive Fellows of Christian Science Monitor described the book as a "quirky and engrossing celebration of the Series". He continued: "Throughout, Kepner's love of the game is infectious. His passion and experience as a sports columnist come together to make each story lively and compelling. Reading "The Grandest Stage", bouncing from story to story, feels like having an all-night-long chat with a fellow baseball-obsessed friend."

Steven Roberts of The Washington Post described the book as "full of lively incidents and insights".

A.R. Hoffman of The New York Sun praised the book and Kepner's writing: "With encyclopedic knowledge and a spry pen… Mr. Kepner strikes the right balance between reverence for the game's legends and respect for the randomness in outcome its difficulty ensures… "The Grandest Stage" is full of unexpected facts and lists sure to stir debate through the cold months between the final out of the World Series and the first toss of spring training."

The book was nominated for the Casey Award in 2022.
