= Contrastive focus reduplication =

Grammatical phenomenon

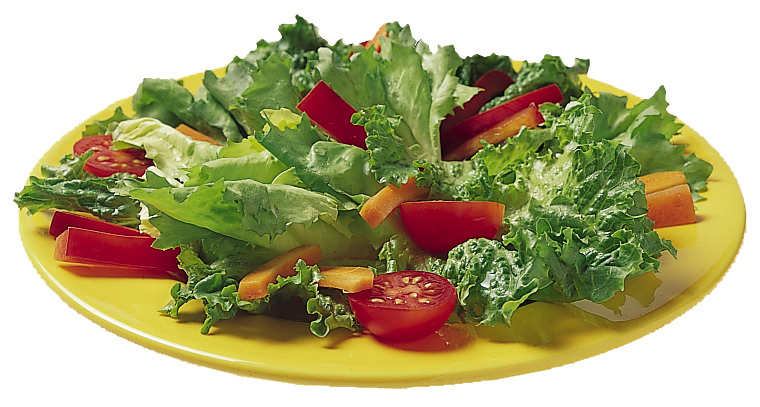
A meatless salad may be referred to as a salad-salad, as opposed to a tuna salad.

Contrastive focus reduplication, also called contrastive reduplication, identical constituent compounding, lexical cloning, or the double construction, is a type of syntactic reduplication found in some languages. Doubling a word or phrase – such as "do you like-like him?" – can indicate that the prototypical meaning of the repeated word or phrase is intended.

"As a rough approximation, we can say that the reduplicated modifier singles out a member or subset of the extension of the noun that represents a true, real, default, or prototype instance."

In English, the first part of the reduplicant bears contrastive intonational stress.

Contrastive focus reduplication in English can apply not only to words but also to multi-word phrases such as idioms, or to word stems without their inflectional morphemes.

- I talked to him that week, but I didn't talk to him talk to him.
- In fact I barely talked to him. Not talk talked.

== Terminology ==
Contrastive focus reduplication has been called by various names in English. Early work on the construction referred to it as double or lexical cloning due to its superficial characteristics.

Theoretical differences in the approach to the construction result in different nomenclatures, as there are theoretical assumptions which underlie any expression. For example, reduplication is often thought of as a morphophonological process, whereas compounding is often regarded as a morphosyntactic process.

American writer Paul Dickson coined the term word word in 1982 to describe this phenomenon.

== Structure ==
Contrastive focus reduplication features two identical – or near-identical – constituents; these constituents can be words, idioms, or phrases. In English, the left constituent bears contrastive stress, and the right-constituent bears the weight of inflectional morphology.

== In English ==
Contrastive focus reduplication is a form of motivated redundancy. It is primarily employed as a form of repair in order to reinforce a speaker's true intended meaning.

=== Examples ===
The authors of the article that defined contrastive focus reduplication collected a corpus of examples in English. These include:

- "I'll make the tuna salad and you make the salad salad."
- "How do they know it's turkey bacon and not bacon bacon?"
- "I'm up, I'm just not up up."
- "Is that carrot cheesecake or carrot cake-cake?"

In Canadian English, French French means French as spoken in France, as opposed to Canadian French. This can be analyzed either as contrastive focus reduplication, or simply as the noun French (the French language) preceded by the adjective French (from France). Compare English English, the English language as spoken in England, which may also be considered "prototypical English".

== In other languages ==
This construction has been identified in German, though research suggests that the meaning of the construction is not readily understood by all speakers. A typical phrase in Germany is Er ist mein Freund, aber nicht mein Freund Freund 'He's my friend, but not my friend friend [boyfriend]'. It is used to disambiguate because there is no word commonly used in colloquial German that specifically means 'boyfriend'. In German, such forms are often treated as identical constituent compounds (ICCs), where Freund-Freund emphasizes a prototypical or "real" sense of the noun and can highlight a contrast with non-prototypical interpretations.

This linguistic phenomenon is also present in Assyrian Neo-Aramaic, particularly among speakers raised among English-speakers. A phrasal example in the language will be; "qartela, ina lela qarta-qarta" 'it's cold, but it's not cold-cold'.

In Croatian, a similar phenomenon is termed contrastive lexical repetition. Examples include beba beba ('baby baby', emphasizing an infant), kruh kruh ('bread bread', referring to a standard loaf), and meso meso ('meat meat', meaning pure meat rather than scraps). These constructions highlight a more prototypical sense of the word and may convey intensification. Compared to English, Croatian allows modifiers (daj joj sirovo MESO meso 'give her raw MEAT meat') but disallows partial repetition (**HIT hitovi 'hit hits' is ungrammatical). It also uses fewer fixed-phrase reduplications (e.g. ići VAN van 'go OUT out'). Though there is no direct evidence of its earliest use, English-language pop culture likely helped spread this construction among younger Croatian speakers.

In Spanish, nominal lexical reduplication (e.g., café café, lana lana) has been analyzed as a device that highlights the prototypical meaning of the word, situating it among intensifying appositive structures and examining its lexical-syntactic status.

In Russian, syntactic reduplication is widely employed in dialogic contexts, but real contrastive focus reduplication is rare. An example is zdes zdes 'here here', in a dialogue asking whether Pushkin was killed at the very exact spot.

== See also ==
- Retronym
- Compound (linguistics)
- Epizeuxis
