= Echo word =

Kind of reduplication in South Asian languages

An echo word, in linguistics, is a form of reduplication as a widespread areal feature in the languages of South Asia. Echo words are characterized by reduplication of a complete word or phrase, with the initial segment or syllable of the reduplicant being overwritten by a fixed segment or syllable. In most languages in which this phenomenon is present, echo words serve to express a meaning of "... and such; and things like that." In some cases the echo word may express a depreciative meaning as well.

Echo word usage is almost exclusively a feature of colloquial spoken speech. It is avoided in formal speech and writing in all languages.

For example, Tamil echo words are formed with a ki(i) sequence overwriting the onset and nucleus of the first syllable of the reduplicant (Keane 2001). ki- with a short vowel is used if the first syllable of the original word or phrase has a short vowel; if the first vowel is long, kii- is used instead. E.g.:

Example Tamil echo words
Tamil word	Transliteration	Meaning
புலி	puli	"tiger"
புலி கிலி	puli kili	"tigers and such; tigers and beasts like that"
பூச்சி	poochi	"insect"
பூச்சி கீச்சி	poochi kiichi	"insects and such; insects and bugs like that"
தும்மி	tummi	"sneezing"
தும்மி கிம்மி	tummi kimmi	"sneezing and such; sneezing and other inauspicious noises"
பாம்பு	paambu	"snake"
பாம்பு கீம்பு	paambu kiimbu	"snakes and such"
இன்னிக்கி அப்பா வரார்ண்ணு சொல்லாதே	innikki appaa varaarṇṇu collaatee	"Don't say 'Father's coming today.'"
இன்னிக்கி அப்பா வரார்ண்ணு கிப்பா வரார்ண்ணு சொல்லாதே	innikki appaa varaarṇṇu kippaa varaarṇṇu collaatee	"Don't say 'Father's coming today' and so forth."

Echo words in Hindi are typically created with a fixed initial v:

aam	"mango"
aam vaam	"mangoes and the like"
tras	"grief"
tras vras	"grief and the like"

When an echo word is formed from a word that already begins with v, complete identity between the base and reduplicant is avoided by overwriting with a different fixed segment (Nevins 2005):

vakil	"lawyer"
vakil šakil	"lawyers and the like"

Persian:

vakīl	"lawyer"
vakīl makīl	"lawyers and such"

ketāb	"book"
ketāb metāb	"books and the sort"

raxt	"clothing item, attire"
raxt-o paxt	"clothes and such"

This kind of avoidance of complete identity is found in many languages with echo words. In some other languages, echo word formation simply fails in cases where an echo word's reduplicant portion would be identical to the base (Abbi 1985). This is claimed for some dialects of Tamil, for example, such that the echo word version of a word like கிழமை kizhamai "day of the week" is simply ineffable (Sankaranarayanan 1982).

(Trivedi 1990) identified twenty distinct regions within India which use different consonants or combinations of consonants in the formation of echo words. These include languages from the Dravidian, Indo-Aryan, Tibeto-Burman and Austroasiatic families. In general, Dravidian languages form echo words with velar-initial fixed syllables (gi- or ki-). Indo-Aryan languages typically use labial fixed onsets (ʋ-, p-, pʰ-, b-, or m-). Other languages of India often use coronal fixed onsets (s-, t-, or ʈ-) or mixed systems using both labial and coronal onsets. However, there is a great deal of overlap and complexity within these systems, and they resist simple classification. For example, as seen in the examples above, Hindi typically employs labial ʋ- for echo word formation, but to avoid base-reduplicant identity it makes use of coronal ʃ-.

Echo word formation is not restricted to languages of India. It also occurs in many languages of Pakistan, Afghanistan, Bangladesh, and other South Asian countries. Some reduplicative patterns in Persian and in Turkish and other Turkic languages have sometimes been classified as echo word formation as well.

A doctoral dissertation by A. Parimalagantham provides a detailed description of echo word usage in Tamil and Telugu

== See also ==
- Hobson-Jobson, an Indian English expression adopted as the name of an Indian English dictionary.
- Shm-reduplication

== Bibliography ==
- Abbi, Anvita (1985). Reduplicative Structures: A Phenomenon of the South Asian Linguistic Area. Oceanic Linguistics Special Publications. pp. 159–171.
- Keane, Elinor (2001). Echo Words in Tamil. Ph.D. thesis, Oxford University.
- Nevins, Andrew (2005). "Overwriting does not optimize in nonconcatenative morphology". Linguistic Inquiry. 36 (2): 275–287. doi:10.1162/0024389053710693. S2CID 57563066.
- Sankaranarayanan, G. (1982). "Reduplication in Tamil". Pakha Sanjam. 15: 457–464.
- Trivedi, G. M. (1990). "Echo Formation". Linguistic Traits Across Language Boundaries: 51–81.
