= Retronym =

Word altered to differentiate from a new use

A retronym is a newer name for something that differentiates it from something else that is newer, similar, or seen in everyday life, thus avoiding confusion between the two.

== Etymology ==
The term retronym, a neologism composed of the combining forms retro- (from Latin retro, "before") + -nym (from Greek ónoma, "name"), was coined by Frank Mankiewicz in 1980 and popularized by William Safire in The New York Times Magazine.

In 2000, The American Heritage Dictionary (4th edition) became the first major dictionary to include the word retronym.

== Examples ==
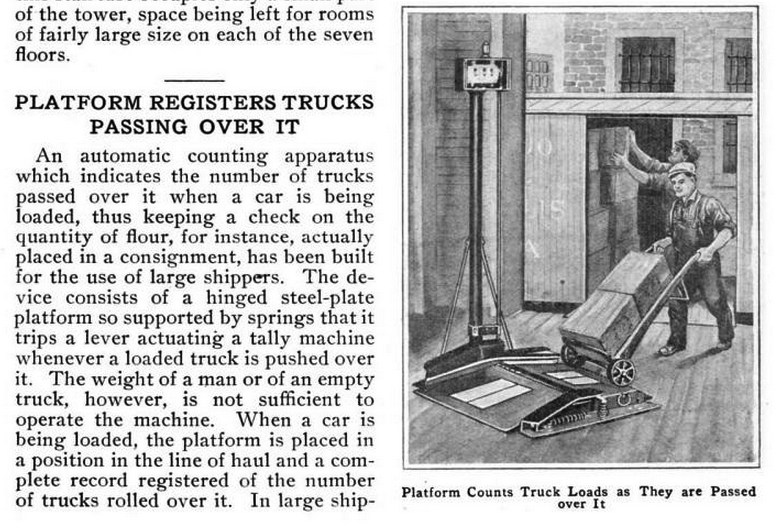
This column about "trucks and cars" from Popular Mechanics in 1914 was written when the word truck did not necessarily connote a motor truck or the word car a motor car. The same things today would most likely be respectively called hand trucks and railroad cars, terms that existed in 1914 but were not yet required for clarity.

The global war from 1914 to 1918 was referred to at the time as the Great War. However, after the subsequent global war erupted in 1939, the phrase Great War was gradually deprecated. The first came to be known as World War I and the second as World War II.

The first bicycles with two wheels of equal size were called "safety bicycles" because they were easier to handle than the then-dominant style that had one large wheel and one small wheel, which then became known as an "ordinary" bicycle. Since the end of the 19th century, most bicycles have been expected to have two equal-sized wheels, and the other type has been renamed "penny-farthing" or "high-wheeler" bicycle.

The Atari Video Computer System platform was rebranded the "Atari 2600" (after its product code, CX-2600) in 1982 following the launch of its successor, the Atari 5200, after which all hardware and software related to the platform were released under this new naming convention. Prior to that time, Atari often used the initialism "VCS" in official literature and other media, but colloquially the Video Computer System was often simply called "the Atari."

The television series Star Trek became known as Star Trek: The Original Series to distinguish it from its franchise.

The first film in the Star Wars franchise released in 1977 was simply titled Star Wars. It was given the subtitle "Episode IV: A New Hope" for its 1981 theatrical re-release, shortly after the release of its sequel The Empire Strikes Back in 1980. Initially, this subtitle was limited to the opening text crawl, as all three films in the original Star Wars trilogy (Star Wars, The Empire Strikes Back, and Return of the Jedi) were still sold under their original theatrical titles on home media formats (such as VHS and LaserDisc). It was not until their 2004 DVD releases that the titles of the individual three films were changed to match the pattern of the Star Wars prequel trilogy (e.g. Star Wars Episode IV - A New Hope).

Often, when films or video games gain sequels that start a series, the first of them is often informally referred to with a "1" or "I" after the title, even if they do not canonically receive such a designation, such as with Street Fighter in relation to Street Fighter II. In cases of reboots with names identical to the first entry in the series, year dates are added to the title to distinguish the reboot from the original, such as Doom (1993) and Doom (2016).

In the 1990s, when the Internet became widely popular and email accounts' instant delivery common, mail carried by the postal service came to be called "snail mail" for its slower delivery compared to email.

Advances in technology and science are often responsible for the coinage of retronyms. For example, the term acoustic guitar was coined with the advent of the electric guitar, analog watch was introduced to distinguish from the digital watch, push bike was created to distinguish from the motorized bicycle, and feature phone was coined to distinguish from the smartphone. Likewise, visible light refers to electromagnetic radiation on the narrow visible spectrum, and water ice was coined to distinguish the solid state of water (including exotic forms) from the solid state of other volatiles such as carbon dioxide and argon.

== See also ==
- Back-formation
- Backronym
- Contrastive focus reduplication
- Markedness
- -onym
- Protologism
