= Ronnie Wilbur =

American linguist

Ronnie Bring Wilbur is an American theoretical and experimental linguist and a professor of linguistics in the Department of Linguistics, School of Interdisciplinary Studies, College of Liberal Arts, at Purdue University in West Lafayette, Indiana. She also has a joint appointment in the Department of Speech, Language, and Hearing Sciences in the College of Health and Human sciences. Her main focus is sign language linguistics. Some of Wilbur's major contributions to the subfield include the discovery that sign languages have syllables similar to spoken languages and that blinks can be used grammatically to mark clause boundaries. Wilbur is the director of the Sign Language Linguistics Laboratory at Purdue. Research on the cross-linguistic typology of sign languages is a major focus, including Croatian Sign Language (HZJ), Austrian Sign Language (ÖGS), and Turkish Sign Language (TİD).

== Bibliography (selection) ==
- Wilbur, R. B. (1979). American Sign Language and sign systems. Univ Park Press.
- Wilbur, R. B. (1987). American Sign Language: Linguistic and applied dimensions (2nd ed.). New York, NY, US: Little, Brown and Co.
- Wilbur, R. B. (2011). Nonmanuals, semantic operators, domain marking, and the solution to two outstanding puzzles in ASL. Sign Language & Linguistics 14: 148–178.
- Wilbur, R. B. (2011). Modality and the structure of language: Sign languages versus signed systems. In M. Marschark & P. Spencer (eds.), The handbook of deaf studies, language, and education, 332-346. Oxford: Oxford University Press.
- Wilbur, R. B. (2011). Sign syllables. In van Oostendorp, Marc, Colin J. Ewen, Elizabeth Hume and Keren Rice (eds). The Blackwell Companion to Phonology, 1309–1334. Blackwell Publishing. Blackwell Reference Online.
- Malaia, E, Wilbur, R.B. (2019). Syllable as a unit of information transfer in linguistic communication: the Entropy Syllable Parsing model. WIREs Cognitive Science e1518.
