= Um-Shmum =

Derogatory Hebrew/Israeli term for United Nations

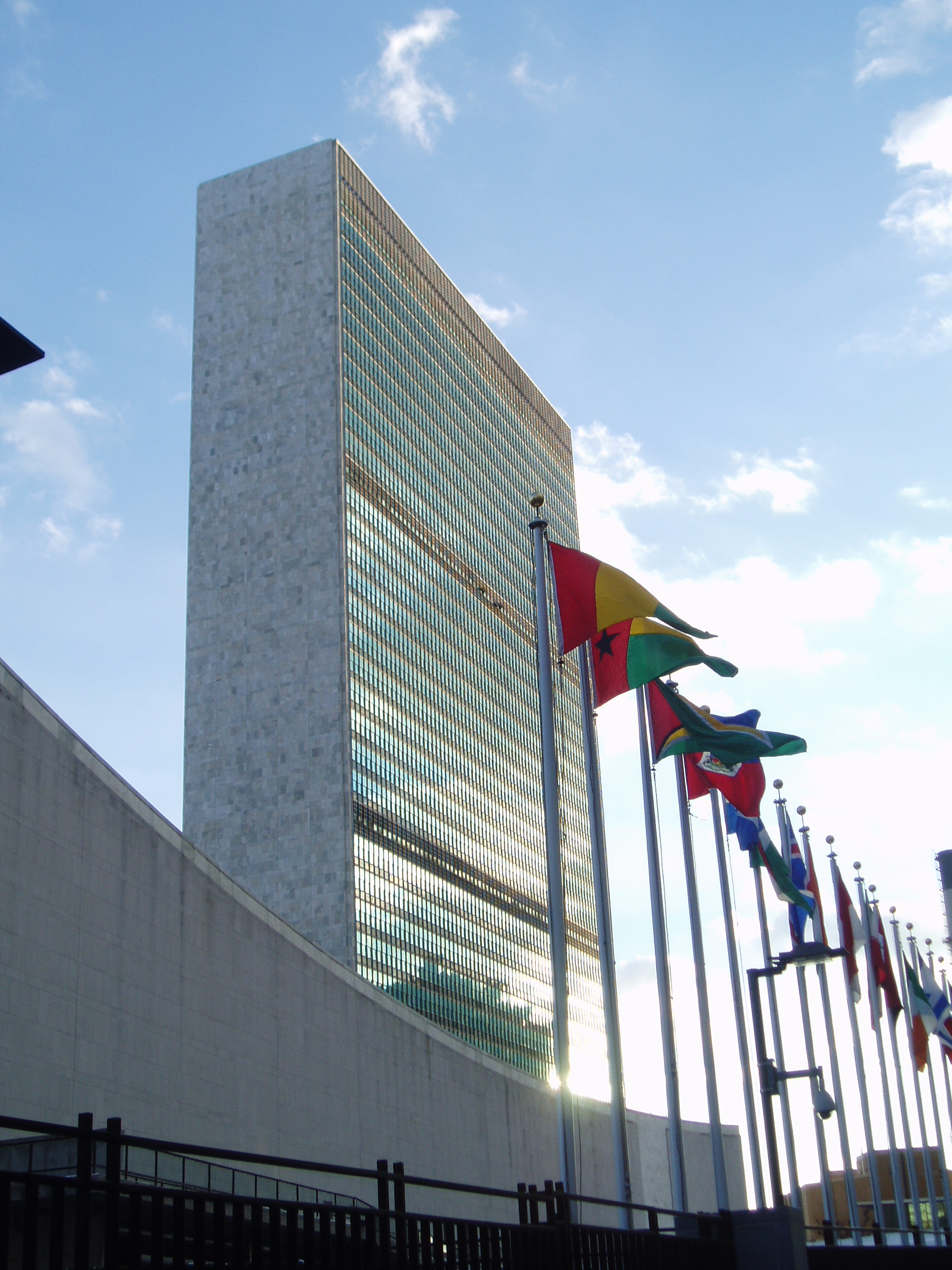
"Um-Shmum", UN headquarters in New York

Um-Shmum (Hebrew: או"ם שמום Hebrew pronunciation: [ˈ(ʔ)um ˈʃmum], where um is the Hebrew acronymic pronunciation for "U.N.", and the "shm"-prefix signifies dismissal, contempt or irony) is a phrase coined by the Israeli Minister of Defense (and former Prime Minister) David Ben-Gurion on March 29, 1955, during a cabinet debate regarding his plan to take the Gaza Strip from Egypt in response to the increasing fedayeen terror attacks on Israel.

== History ==
The original expression was uttered as a response to Prime Minister Moshe Sharett, who had stated in the previous cabinet session that if it hadn't been for the UN resolution of 1947, the State of Israel would not have been founded. According to Sharett's account in his diary, Ben-Gurion shouted: "Not at all! Only the daring of the Jews founded this country, and not some Um-Shmum resolution."

The term expresses contempt for the institutional-political importance of the United Nations, and denotes a feeling among many members of the Israeli public that the UN's policies towards Israel are biased and unfair.

In 1998, Kofi Annan quoted this phrase while visiting the Knesset (Israeli Parliament) and made a rebutting pun himself by saying that in the world that we live in today, "without the UM we will all have klum" (klum is part of expressions that mean "nothing" in Hebrew).

== See also ==
- Israel and the United Nations
- Joe Shmoe
- Culture of Israel
