= Shm-reduplication =

Feature of Yiddish expressing parody or skepticism

Shm-reduplication or schm-reduplication is a form of reduplication originating in Yiddish in which the original word or its first syllable (the base) is repeated with the copy (the reduplicant) beginning with the duplifix shm- (sometimes schm-), pronounced /ʃm/. The construction is generally used to indicate irony, sarcasm, derision, skepticism, or lack of interest with respect to comments about the discussed object. In general, the new combination is used as an interjection.

== Examples ==
=== Using a noun ===
Shm-reduplication is often used with a noun, as a response to a previously-made statement to express the viewer's doubts (eg. "He's just a baby!", "Baby-shmaby, he's five years old!") or lack of interest ("What a sale!", "Sale, schmale, there's nothing I would want.")

=== Used as an adjective ===
When used as an adjective, the reduplicated combination can belong to the same syntactical category as the original.

It can be used as an intensifier, as in "Whenever we go to a fancy-schmancy restaurant, we feel like James Bond." - the speaker is implying that the restaurant is particularly fancy.

== Phonological properties ==
- Words beginning with a single consonant typically have that consonant replaced with shm- (table shmable).
- Words beginning with a consonant cluster are more variable: some speakers replace only the first consonant if possible (breakfast shmreakfast), others replace the entire cluster (breakfast shmeakfast).
- Vowel-initial words prepend the shm- directly to the beginning of the reduplicant (apple shmapple). Although this is conventionally seen by English speakers as purely adding consonants to a word, from a strictly phonetic point of view this, too, is a replacement of the initial glottal stop by the /ʃm/ morpheme.
- Some speakers target the stressed syllable rather than the first syllable (incredible inshmedible); a subset of these also drop the preceding syllables (incredible shmedible; cf. Spitzer 1952).
- With two words, usually the first word is shm-reduplicated (Spider-Man Shmider-Man). However, if the second word has more syllables than the first, the second word is often reduplicated instead (Led Zeppelin Led Shmeppelin).
- Many speakers use sm- instead of shm- with words that contain a /ʃ/ (Ashmont Smashmont, not Shmashmont).
- For some words where shm- would be awkward, such as by having a second syllable containing /m/ (Plymouth, climate, trombone), shl- can be used instead (Shlymouth, shlimate, shlombone).
- Shm-reduplication is generally avoided or altered with words that already begin with shm-; for instance, schmuck does not yield the expected "schmuck shmuck", but rather total avoidance or mutation of the shm- (giving forms like schmuck shluck, schmuck fluck, and so on).

Bert Vaux and Andrew Nevins' online survey of shm-reduplication revealed further phonological details.

== Origins and sociolinguistic distribution ==
The construction originated in Yiddish and was subsequently transferred to English, especially urban northeastern American English, by Yiddish-speaking Jewish immigrations from Central and Eastern Europe. It is now known and used by many non-Jewish English speakers, particularly American English. The construction was also adopted in Modern Hebrew usage as a prefix resulting in a derogatory echoic expressive. For example, March 29, 1955, David Ben-Gurion dismissed a United Nations resolution as "Um-Shmum", (U.M. being the UN's Hebrew acronym, Hebrew pronunciation: [ˈ(ʔ)um ˈʃmum]).

Ghil'ad Zuckermann wrote: "When an Israeli speaker would like to express his impatience with or disdain for philosophy, s/he can say filosófya-shmilosófya". Zuckermann mentions in this context the Turkic initial m-segment conveying a sense of "and so on" as in the Turkish sentence dergi mergi okumuyor, roughly "doesn’t read magazines shmagazines", i.e. "(he) doesn't read magazines or anything similar".

A similar phenomenon is present in most of the languages of the Balkan sprachbund, especially in colloquial Bulgarian where not only "sh(m)-" and "m-", but also other consonants and consonant clusters are used in this way, and its usage has its particularities that differ from what the English "shm" indicates.

== As a counterexample in linguistics ==
Shm-reduplication has been advanced as an example of a natural-language phenomenon that cannot be captured by a context-free grammar. The essential argument was that the reduplication can be repeated indefinitely, producing a sequence of phrases of geometrically increasing length, which cannot occur in a context-free language.

== See also ==
- Inherently funny word
- Joe Shmoe
- Reduplication
- Redundancy
- Pig Latin
- Spoonerisms
- Nilsson Schmilsson (1971)
- Oedipus Schmoedipus (1996)
- Rainforest Shmainforest (1999)
- Schmigadoon! (2021)

== Notes and references ==
- Feinsilver, Lillian Mermin. "On Yiddish Shm-". American Speech 36 (1961): 302–3.
- Nevins, Andrew and Bert Vaux. "Metalinguistic, Shmetalinguistic: The phonology of shm-reduplication". Proceedings of the Chicago Linguistics Society annual meeting, April 2003.
- Southern, Mark. Contagious Couplings: Transmission of Expressives in Yiddish Echo Phrases. Westport: Greenwood, 2005.
- Spitzer, Leo. "Confusion Shmooshun". Journal of English and Germanic Philology 51 (1952): 226–33.
- Shm-reduplication in Russian language (in Russian)
