= Mortlock Islands =

Mortlock Islands can refer to:

- Nomoi Islands, a group of three large atolls in the state of Chuuk, Federated States of Micronesia
- Takuu Atoll, a Polynesian outlier atoll northeast of Bougainville, Papua New Guinea
