= Sanskrit verbs =

Sanskrit has, together with Ancient Greek, kept most intact among descendants the elaborate verbal morphology of Proto-Indo-European. Sanskrit verbs (Note: kriyā) thus have an inflection system for different combinations of tense, aspect, mood, voice, number, and person. Non-finite forms such as participles are also extensively used.

Some of the features of the verbal system, however, have been lost in the classical language, compared to the older Vedic Sanskrit, and in other cases, distinctions that have existed between different tenses have been blurred in the later language. Classical Sanskrit thus does not have the subjunctive or the injunctive mood, has dropped a variety of infinitive forms, and the distinctions in meaning between the imperfect, perfect and aorist forms are barely maintained and ultimately lost.

== Basics ==
Verb conjugation in Sanskrit involves the interplay of five 'dimensions', number (Note: vacana), person (Note: puruṣa), voice (Note: prayoga), mood (Note: artha) and tense (Note: kāla), with the following variables:

1	3 numbers	singular (Note: eka·vacana), dual (Note: dvi·vacana), plural (Note: bahu·vacana)
2	3 persons	first (Note: prathama·puruṣa), second (Note: dvitīya·puruṣa), third (Note: tṛtīya·puruṣa)
3	3 voices	active (Note: kartari·prayoga), middle (Note: karmaṇi·prayoga), passive (Note: bhāve·prayoga)
4	4 moods	indicative, optative, imperative, conditional
5	6 tenses	present, imperfect, perfect, aorist, periphrastic future, simple future

Further, participles are considered part of the verbal systems although they are not verbs themselves, and as with other Sanskrit nouns, they can be declined across seven or eight cases, for three genders and three numbers.

Classical Sanskrit has only one infinitive, of accusative case-form.

== Building blocks ==
=== Roots ===
The starting point for the morphological analysis of the Sanskrit verb is the root (Note: dhātu). It is conventionally indicated using the mathematical symbol √; for instance, "√bhū-" means the root "bhū-".

There are about 2000 roots enumerated by the ancient grammarians, of which less than half are attested in actual use. Allowing for sorting reduplication and other anomalies, there remain somewhat over 800 roots that form the practical basis of the verbal system, as well as the larger part of the inherited nominal stems of the language.

Compared to kindred Indo-European languages, Sanskrit is more readily analysable in its morphological structure, and its roots are more easily separable from accretionary elements.

=== Stems and stem formation ===
Before the final endings — to denote number, person etc can be applied, additional elements may be added to the root. Whether such elements are affixed or not, the resulting component here is the stem, to which these final endings can then be added.

$$\underbrace{\underbrace{\mathrm{root+suffix}}_{\mathrm{stem}} + \mathrm{ending}}_{\mathrm{word}}$$

The following types of treatment are possible on the root to form the stem:

==== No Treatment ====
The personal endings are directly affixed to the root with no prior modification, subject to any internal sandhi rules in the process. With a few exceptions, the root keeps the accent and guṇa grade in the three persons of the active, while elsewhere the termination takes on the accent and the root grade is weakened.

There are around 130 roots in Sanskrit that come under this class. Sanskrit is unique among the ancient Indo-European languages to have largely preserved this system, which has largely died out in the others. (Note: The roots *h₁es- 'to be, is' and *h₁ed- 'eat' are notable exceptions that have retained some athematic-influenced behavior in a great many daughter languages.) Since adding endings to the root is complicated by phonological changes, the tendency right from the Proto-Indo-European stage has been to use thematic processes instead.

==== Suffixation ====
A theme vowel is suffixed before any personal endings are added. In Sanskrit, this is -a-, inherited from Proto-Indo-European *-o- and *-e-. The addition of the theme vowel serves to avoid complications due to internal sandhi; the large majority of the verbs in the language are thematic.

Sanskrit also inherits other suffixes from Proto-Indo-European: -ya-, -ó- / -nó-, -nā-, and -aya-. (Note: A small number of roots, in the present stem, add -ch- to the root, sometimes dropping the final consonant first. This is same as the -sc- used in Latin to form inchoative verbs. Examples: √gam- ⇒ gaccha-, √yam- ⇒ yaccha-, (Note: reach) √iṣ- iccha- (Note: wish; cognate with English ask, and Slavic *jьska·ti, 'seek', where the same element can be found)) Of these the first and the last include the thematic vowel while the others are athematic.

==== Infixation ====
Another treatment also from Proto-Indo-European is inserting an exponent within the root itself. All roots undergoing this treatment end in consonants. In weak forms, the infix is simply a nasal (n, ñ, ṇ, ṅ), while in strong forms this expands to -ná- and bears the accent.

==== Accent and gradation ====
During conjugation, the accent might fall either on the root vowel or on the ending. Among thematic verbs, some roots always get the accent, accompanied by a strengthening of the grade to guṇa or vṛddhi, while in others it always falls on the ending. In non-thematic cases, the position of the accent varies.

The general rule for variable-accent verbs is that in the indicative the stem has the accent and the guṇa grade in the three persons of the singular active, and that in the dual and plural of the active and the whole of the middle, the accent falls on the ending and the stem is in its weak form.

==== Reduplication ====
The root might be subject to reduplication, wherein a part of it is prefixed to itself in the process of forming the stem. For roots beginning in a consonant, that initial consonant, or a modified form of it, is taken, while for those beginning in a vowel, it's the very vowel.

The potential modifications that might be made to the prefix consonant can be seen in some typical examples below:

Reduplication patterns
Root	Reduplication	Remarks
√budh-	bu·budh-	standard
√śru-	śu·śru-	standard
√dhā-	da·dhā-	aspirate → non-aspirate
√kṛ-	ca-kṛ	guttural → palatal
√khid-	ci·khid-	guttural → palatal
√grabh-	ja·grabh-	guttural → palatal
√hṛ-	ja·hṛ-	guttural → palatal
√stṛ-	ta·stṛ-	second consonant in a cluster
√sthā-	ta·sthā-	second consonant in a cluster
√skand-	ca·skand-	a combination of above rules

==== Augment ====
Roots are prefixed with an á- (from PIE é-) in preterite formations (imperfect, aorist, pluperfect, conditional). The augment without exception bears the accent in these forms. When the root starts with any of the vowels i-, u- or ṛ, the vowel is subject to vṛddhi and not guṇa.

- icch·á·ti -> aí·cch·a·t
- urṇó·ti -> aú·rṇo·t
- ṛdh·nó·ti -> ā́r·dh·no·t

=== Voice ===
Sanskrit has in the present inherited two sets of personal endings from its parent Proto-Indo-European, one for the active voice (Note: parasmaipada, lit. 'word for another') and another for the middle voice (Note: atmanepada, lit. 'word for self'). Only some verbs can be conjugated in either voice, most verbs only show one or the other.

Originally the active voice suggested action carried out for someone else and the middle voice meant action carried out for oneself. By the time of Classical Sanskrit, and especially in later literature, this distinction blurred and in many cases eventually disappeared.

=== Personal endings ===
Conjugational endings in Sanskrit convey person, number, and voice. Different forms of the endings are used depending on what tense stem and mood they are attached to. Verb stems or the endings themselves may be changed or obscured by sandhi. The theoretical forms of the endings are as follow:

		Active			Middle		
	Person	Singular	Dual	Plural	Singular	Dual	Plural
Primary	3	-ti	-tás	-ánti, -áti	-té	-ā́te	-ánte, -áte
Primary	2	-si	-thás	-thá	-sé	-ā́the	-dhvé
Primary	1	-mi	-vás	-más	-é	-váhe	-máhe
Secondary	3	-t	-tā́m	-án, -ús	-tá	-ā́tām	-ánta, -áta, -rán
Secondary	2	-s	-tám	-tá	-thā́s	-ā́thām	-dhvám
Secondary	1	-am	-vá	-má	-í, -á	-váhi	-máhi
Perfect	3	-a	-átus	-ús	-é	-ā́te	-ré
Perfect	2	-tha	-áthus	-á	-sé	-ā́the	-dhvé
Perfect	1	-a	-vá	-má	-é	-váhe	-máhe
Imperative	3	-tu	-tā́m	-ántu, -átu	-tā́m	-ā́tām	-ántām, -átām
Imperative	2	-dhí, -hí,—	-tám	-tá	-svá	-ā́thām	-dhvám
Imperative	1	-āni	-āva	-āma	-āi	-āvahāi	-āmahāi

Primary endings are used with present indicative and future forms. Secondary endings are used with the imperfect, conditional, aorist, and optative. Perfect and imperative endings are used with the perfect and imperative respectively.

=== Verb classes ===
Based on the treatment they undergo to form the stem, the roots of the Sanskrit language are arranged by the ancient grammarians in ten classes, called gaṇa, based on how they form the present stem, and named after a verb typical to each class.

No discoverable grammatical principle has been found for the ordering of these classes. This can be rearranged for greater clarity into non-thematic and thematic groups as summarized below:

Thematic verb classes
Root		Treatment	Stem	Gaṇa	Conjugation samples (Note: Present indicative third-person singular)	Remarks
√bhū-	(Note: be, become, exist, be born/produced; also cognate, See *bʰuH-)	Root accent, gunated (Note: Occasionally vriddhied)	bháv-	First (Note: bhu·ādi)	bháv·a·ti	The commonest of all classes, with nearly half of the roots in the language.
√tud-	(Note: strike, beat; cognate with Latin tundō, studium)	None (ending accent)	tud-	Sixth (Note: tud·ādi)	tud·á·ti	
√dív-	(Note: cast, throw, especially of dice)	-ya- suffix	dī́v·ya-	Fourth (Note: div·ādi)	dī́v·ya·ti	
√cur-	(Note: steal)	-aya- with root gradation, or -áya- without	cór·aya-	Tenth (Note: cur·ādi)	cór·aya·ti	Usually to form causatives, not strictly a class per se

Athematic verb classes
Root		Treatment	Stem	gaṇa	Conjugation samples (Note: Present indicative third-person singular, dual and plural)
√ad-	(Note: eat; also cognate, see *h₁ed-)	None	ad-	Second (Note: ad·ādi)	at·ti at·tas ad·anti
√hu-	(Note: call, invoke, sacrifice, cognate with English 'god', see *ǵʰewH- and *ǵʰew-)	Reduplication, accent varies	juhó- juhu- júhv-	Third (Note: juhauty·ādi)	juhó·ti juhu·tás júhv·ati
√su-	(Note: press (of juice))	-no- suffix	su·nó- su·nu- su·nv-	Fifth (Note: su·ādi)	su·nó·ti su·nu·tás su·nv·ánti
√tan-	(Note: extend, spread; cognate with 'thin' and 'tenuous', see *ten- and *tn̥néwti)	-o- suffix	tan·ó- tan·u- tan·v-	Eighth (Note: tan·ādi) (Note: Very similar to the Fifth class)	tan·ó·ti tan·u·tás tan·v·ánti
√krī-	(Note: buy)	-nā- suffix	krī·ṇā́- krī·ṇī- krī·ṇ-	Ninth (Note: kry·ādi)	krī·ṇā́·ti krī·ṇī·tás krī·ṇ-ánti
√rudh-	(Note: stop, arrest, check)	Nasal infix	ru·ṇá·dh- ru·n·dh-	Seventh (Note: rudh·ādi)	ru·ṇá·d·dhi ru·n·d·dhás ru·n·dh·ánti

=== Seṭ and aniṭ roots ===
Sanskrit roots may also be classified, independent of their gaṇa, into three groups, depending on whether they take the vowel i before certain tense markers. Since the term used for this vowel by Sanskrit grammarians is iṭ, these two groups are called seṭ (with iṭ), veṭ (optional iṭ), and aniṭ (without iṭ), respectively. (Note: Aṣṭādhyāyī 1.2.18, 6.4.121, 3.1.45, 6.1.188, 6.4.51, 7.2.61)

The i sound in question is a phoneme i that appears in certain morphological circumstances for certain, lexically defined roots, regularly continuing Proto-Indo-European (PIE) laryngeals, as in *bʰéuH·tu·m > bháv·i·tum. Note that the PIE laryngeal (represented by an *H here) was a part of the PIE root; it occurs in all of its allomorphs, for example *bʰuH·tó·s > bhū·tá·s (*bʰeuH- is reduced to *bʰuH- in PIE due to ablaut; the laryngeal disappears in this context, leaving its trace in the length of ū in Sanskrit). In Classical Sanskrit, the scope of this i was broadened by analogous change.

In the Aṣṭādhyāyī the synchronic analysis of the phenomenon is somewhat different: the i sound is treated as an augment (Note: called āgama in the terminology of the later Paninean school) of the suffix that follows the root. Rule 7.2.35 states that i should be prepended to ārdhadhātuka suffixes beginning with a consonant other than y; an example of such suffix is -tum (the Classical Sanskrit infinitive).

An example of differences between the two classes is the aorist-marker. While some of the aniṭ-roots form aorist with the -s suffix, seṭ-roots are suffixed by -iṣ.

Following this terminology, PIE roots ending in laryngeals are also called seṭ-roots, and all others aniṭ-roots.

== Conjugation ==
=== Scope ===
As in kindred Indo-European languages, conjugation is effected using the above building blocks across the tenses, moods, voices, persons and numbers, yielding, in Sanskrit, a huge number of combinations.

Where the forms take personal endings, in other words when it complements a subject, these are called finite forms. Sanskrit also has a few subjectless, i.e., non-finite forms. In the standard scenario, the following forms are seen in Classical Sanskrit:

Conjugation – standard finite verbs
System	Tense	Mood	Endings	Conventional term
Present	Present	Indicative	Primary	'Present' (Note: vartamāna, Pāṇini: laṭ)
Present	Present	Optative	Secondary	'Optative' (Note: vidhi, P: vidhi·liṅ)
Present	Present	Imperative	Imperative	'Imperative' (Note: ājñā, P: loṭ)
Present	Imperfect	Indicative	Secondary	'Imperfect' (Note: anadyatana·bhūta, P: laṅ)
Perfect	Perfect	Indicative	Perfect	'Perfect' (Note: parokṣa·bhūta, P: liṭ)
Aorist	Aorist	Indicative	Secondary	'Aorist' (Note: bhūta, P: luṅ)
Aorist	Precative (Note: Also called Benedicitive)	Optative (Note: Very rare in Classical Sanskrit)	Secondary	'Precative' (Note: aśir, P: aśir·liṇ)
Future	Future	Indicative	Primary	'Future' (Note: bhaviṣyan, P: lṛṭ)
Future	Future	Conditional	Secondary	'Conditional' (Note: saṅketa, P: lṛṅ)
Future	Periphrastic	Indicative	Secondary	'Periphrastic' (Note: bhaviṣyan, P: luṭ)

Furthermore, Sanskrit has so-called Secondary conjugations:

- Passive
- Intensive
- Desiderative
- Causative
- Denominative

The non-finite forms are:

- Participles (Note: might take both active and middle voice)
- Infinitive
- Gerund

=== Principal parts ===
It is difficult to generalize how many principal parts a Sanskrit verb possesses, since different verb form categories are used with different degrees of regularity. For the vast majority of verbs, conjugation can be made sufficiently clear with the first five of the following forms supplied:

Principal parts
Part	√bhū-	√kṛ-
Present	bháv·a·ti	kar·ó·ti (Note: strong form) kur·u·tás (Note: weak form)
Past participle	bhū·tá	kṛ·tá
Infinitive	bháv·i·tum	kár·tum
Perfect	babhū́·va	cakā́r·a
Aorist	á·bhū·t (Note: root aorist)	á·kār·ṣ·īt (Note: s-aorist)

== Present system ==
The present system includes the present tense, the imperfect, and the optative and imperative moods, as well as some of the remnant forms of the old subjunctive.

=== Thematic classes ===
All thematic classes have invariant stems and share the same inflectional endings. To demonstrate, observe the conjugation of the Cl. 1 verb √bhū- bháv-. Note that this root is gunated and holds the stress within the root syllable.

==== Present ====
The present indicative takes primary endings.

	Active			Middle		
	Singular	Dual	Plural	Singular	Dual	Plural
3rd	bháv·a·ti	bháv·a·tas	bháv·anti	bháv·a·te	bháv·ete	bháv·ante
2nd	bháv·a·si	bháv·a·thas	bháv·a·tha	bháv·a·se	bháv·ethe	bháv·a·dhve
1st	bháv·ā·mi	bháv·ā·vas	bháv·ā·mas	bháv·e	bháv·ā·vahe	bháv·ā·mahe

==== Imperfect ====
The imperfect takes the augment and secondary endings. The augment always bears the accent with no exceptions.

	Active			Middle		
	Singular	Dual	Plural	Singular	Dual	Plural
3rd	á·bhav·a·t	á·bhav·a·tām	á·bhav·an (Note: á·bhav·an < *á·bhav·ant, as consonant clusters reduce to the first consonant when word-final.)	á·bhav·a·ta	á·bhav·ētām	á·bhav·anta
2nd	á·bhav·a·s	á·bhav·a·tam	á·bhav·a·ta	á·bhav·a·thās	á·bhav·ēthām	á·bhav·a·dhvam
1st	á·bhav·a·m	á·bhav·ā.va	á·bhav·ā·ma	á·bhav·e	á·bhav·ā·vahi	á·bhav·ā·mahi

==== Optative ====
The present optative takes the suffix -e and athematic secondary endings.

	Active			Middle		
	Singular	Dual	Plural	Singular	Dual	Plural
3rd	bháv·e·t	bháv·e·tām	bháv·e·y·us	bháv·e·ta	bháv·e·y·ātām	bháv·e·ran
2nd	bháv·e·s	bháv·e·tam	bháv·e·ta	bháv·e·thās	bháv·e·y·āthām	bháv·e·dhvam
1st	bháv·e·y·am	bháv·e·va	bháv·e·ma	bháv·e·ya	bháv·e·vahi	bháv·e·mahi

==== Imperative ====
The imperative has its own set of special endings. Some of these forms are relics from an original subjunctive.

	Active			Middle		
	Singular	Dual	Plural	Singular	Dual	Plural
3rd	bháv·a·tu	bháv·a·tām	bháv·a·ntu	bháv·a·tām	bháv·e·tām	bháv·a·ntām
2nd	bháv·a	bháv·a·tam	bháv·a·ta	bhav·a·sva	bháv·ethām	bháv·a·dhvam
1st	bháv·āni	bháv·āva	bháv·āma	bháv·ai	bháv·āvahai	bháv·āmahai

=== Athematic classes ===
==== Present ====
The present indicative used the strong stem in the singular and the weak elsewhere. For √kṛ- used as example here, the weak stem final -u- is sometimes omitted before endings in -v- and -m-.

The alternate forms for class 3 (reduplicating class) are shown with hu-. (Note: sacrifice)

	Active			Middle		
	Singular	Dual	Plural	Singular	Dual	Plural
3rd	kar·ó·ti	kur·u·tás	kur·v·ánti/juhv·áti	kur·u·té	kur·v·ā́te	kur·v·áte
2nd	kar·ó·ṣi	kur·u·thás	kur·u·thá	kur·u·ṣé	kur·v·ā́the	kur·u·dhvé
1st	kar·ó·mi	kur·vás	kur·más	kur·vé	kur·váhe	kur·máhe

==== Imperfect ====
The imperfect uses the two stems in the same way as the present.

	Active			Middle		
	Singular	Dual	Plural	Singular	Dual	Plural
3rd	á·kar·o·t	á·kur·u·tām	á·kur·v·an/á·juh·av·us	á·kur·u·ta	á·kur·v·ātām	á·kur·v·ata
2nd	á·kar·o·s	á·kur·u·tam	á·kur·u·ta	á·kur·u·thās	á·kurv·āthām	á·kur·u·dhvam
1st	á·kar·ava·m	á·kur·va	á·kur·ma	á·kur·vi	á·kur·vahi	á·kur·mahi

==== Optative ====
The optative takes the suffix -yā́- in the active, and -ī- in the middle; the stem in front of them is always the weak one. Here the final -u- of the kuru- stem is again irregularly dropped.

	Active			Middle		
	Singular	Dual	Plural	Singular	Dual	Plural
3rd	kur·yā́·t	kur·yā́·tām	kur·yús	kurv·ī·tá	kurv·ī·yā́tām	kurv·ī·rán
2nd	kur·yā́·s	kur·yā́·tam	kur·yā́·ta	kurv·ī·thā́s	kurv·ī·yā́thām	kurv·ī·dhvám
1st	kur·yā́·m	kur·yā́·va	kur·yā́·ma	kurv·ī·yá	kurv·ī·váhi	kurv·ī·máhi

==== Imperative ====
The imperative uses the strong stem in all of the 1st person forms, as well as the 3rd person singular active.

The 2nd person active may have no ending (class 5, class 8), -dhi (most of class 3, class 7, as well as class 1 ending in consonants), or -hi (class 9, class 3 in ā, and class 1 in vowels; these classes usually ended in laryngeals in Proto-Indo-European).

	Active			Middle		
	Singular	Dual	Plural	Singular	Dual	Plural
3rd	kar·ó·tu	kur·u·tā́m	kur·v·ántu/juhv·átu	kur·u·tā́m	kur·v·ā́tām	kur·v·átām
2nd	kur·ú/juhú·dhi/krīṇī́·hi	kur·u·tám	kur·u·tá	kur·u·ṣvá	kur·v·ā́thām	kur·u·dhvám
1st	kar·áv·āni	kar·áv·āva	kar·áv·āma	kar·áv·ai	kar·áv·āvahai	kar·áv·āmahai

== Perfect system ==
The perfect system includes only the perfect (with past indicative meaning). The stem is formed with reduplication; the reduplicated vowel is usually a, but u or i for verbs containing them.

This system also produces separate "strong" and "weak" forms of the verb — the strong guṇa form is used with the singular active, and the weak zero-grade form with the rest. In some verbs, the 3rd and optionally 1st person are further strengthened until the root syllable becomes heavy.

Most verbs ending in consonants behave as seṭ in the perfect tense in front of consonant endings. √kṛ- shown here is one of the exceptions.

	Active			Middle		
	Singular	Dual	Plural	Singular	Dual	Plural
3rd	cakā́r·a	cakr·atús	cakr·ús	cakr·é	cakr·ā́te	cakri·ré
2nd	cakár·tha	cakr·áthus	cakr·á	cakṛ·sé	cakr·ā́the	cakṛ·dhvé
1st	cakā́r·a	cakṛ·vá	cakṛ·má	cakr·é	cakṛ·váhe	cakṛ·máhe

== Aorist system ==
The aorist system includes aorist proper (with past indicative meaning, e.g. abhūḥ 'you were') and some of the forms of the ancient injunctive (used almost exclusively with mā in prohibitions, e.g. mā bhūḥ 'don't be'). The principal distinction of the two is the presence/absence of an augment – á- prefixed to the stem.

The aorist system stem actually has three different formations: the simple aorist, the reduplicating aorist (semantically related to the causative verb), and the sibilant aorist.

=== Root aorist ===
This aorist is formed by directly adding the athematic secondary endings to the root. Originally this type also had different strong and weak stems for the singular and plural, but verbs that both allow this distinction and utilize this type of aorist are exceptionally rare.

From √gam- and √dā- ; (Note: give) the latter takes -us in the 3rd person plural.

	Regular stem			ā-stem		
	Singular	Dual	Plural	Singular	Dual	Plural
3rd	á·gam·at	á·gam·atām	á·gam·an	á·dā·t	á·dā·tām	á·d·us
2nd	á·gam·as	á·gam·atam	á·gam·ata	á·dā·s	á·dā·tam	á·dā·ta
1st	á·gam·am	á·gam·āva	á·gam·āma	á·dā·m	á·dā·va	á·dā·ma

Known instances of weak stems from the Veda include avṛjan from √vṛj- in the plural active, adhithās from √dhā- in the singular middle, and various forms from √kṛ-. Middle voice forms of this class are almost nonexistent in the classical period, being suppleted by those of the sibilant classes.

=== a-root aorist ===
This class is formed with a thematized zero-grade root, and takes regular thematic endings.

From √sic- : (Note: pour)

	Active			Middle		
	Singular	Dual	Plural	Singular	Dual	Plural
3rd	á́·sic·a·t	á·sic·a·tām	á·sic·an	á·sic·a·ta	á·sic·etām	á·sic·anta
2nd	á·sic·a·s	á·sic·a·tam	á·sic·a·ta	á·sic·a·thās	á·sic·ethām	á·sic·a·dhvam
1st	á·sic·a·m	á·sic·ā·va	á·sic·ā·ma	á·sic·e	á·sic·ā·vahi	á·sic·ā·mahi

=== s-aorist ===
This is the most productive aorist class for regular aniṭ verbs, made by suffixing s to the root. All active voice forms use the vṛddhi grade, and middle forms use the weakest grade that produces a heavy root syllable; √kṛ- and some verbs in ā may irregularly use zero grade in place of the latter.

From √ji- : (Note: win)

	Active			Middle		
	Singular	Dual	Plural	Singular	Dual	Plural
3rd	á·jai·ṣ·īt	á·jai·ṣ·ṭām	á·jai·ṣ·us	á·je·ṣ·ṭa	á·je·ṣ·ātām	á·je·ṣ·ata
2nd	á·jai·ṣ·īs	á·jai·ṣ·ṭam	á·jai·ṣ·ṭa	á·je·ṣ·ṭhās	á·je·ṣ·āthām	á·je·ḍhvam
1st	á·jai·ṣ·am	á·jai·ṣ·va	á·jai·ṣ·ma	á·je·ṣ·i	á·je·ṣ·vahi	á·je·ṣ·mahi

From √tud- : (Note: strike)

	Active			Middle		
	Singular	Dual	Plural	Singular	Dual	Plural
3rd	á·taut·s·īt	á·taut·tām	á·taut·s·uḥ	á·tut·ta	á·tut·s·ātām	á·tut·s·ata
2nd	á·taut·s·īs	á·taut·tam	á·taut·ta	á·tut·thās	á·tut·s·āthām	á·tud·dhvam
1st	á·taut·s·am	á·taut·s·va	á·taut·s·ma	á·tut·s·i	á·tut·s·vahi	á·tut·s·mahi

=== is-aorist ===
This aorist form contains the suffix -iṣ- and is the productive form of regular seṭ verbs. The strong active stem is usually strengthened until the root syllable is heavy, and the weak middle stem usually assumes the guṇa grade. Some verbs in a followed by a single consonant, such as grah-, do not take additional strengthening in the active.

From √pū- : (Note: cleanse)

	Active			Middle		
	Singular	Dual	Plural	Singular	Dual	Plural
3rd	á·pāv·īt	á·pāv·iṣ·ṭām	á·pāv·iṣ·us	á·pav·iṣ·ṭa	á·pav·iṣ·ātām	á·pav·iṣ·ata
2nd	á·pāv·īs	á·pāv·iṣ·ṭam	á·pāv·iṣ·ṭa	á·pavi·ṣ·ṭhās	á·pav·iṣ·āthām	á·pav·i·ḍhvam
1st	á·pāv·iṣ·am	á·pāv·iṣ·va	á·pāv·iṣ·ma	á·pav·iṣ·i	á·pav·iṣ·vahi	á·pav·iṣ·mahi

=== sis-aorist ===
This small class is characterized by a reduplicated -siṣ- suffix, and is only used in the active voice; the s-aorist is usually used in the middle by verbs that take this formation.

From √yā- :

	Active		
	Singular	Dual	Plural
3rd	á·yā·s·īt	á·yā·siṣ·ṭām	á·yā·siṣ·us
2nd	á·yā·s·īs	á·yā·siṣ·ṭam	á·yā·siṣ·ṭa
1st	á·yā·siṣ·am	á·yā·siṣ·va	á·yā·siṣ·ma

=== sa-aorist ===
This formation is used with a small number of verbs ending in consonants which can form the cluster kṣ when an -s- is added. It takes a mixture of thematic and athematic endings.

From √diś- : (Note: show)

	Active			Middle		
	Singular	Dual	Plural	Singular	Dual	Plural
3rd	á·dik·ṣa·t	á·dik·ṣa·tām	á·dik·ṣ·an	á·dik·ṣa·ta	á·dik·ṣ·ātām	á·dik·ṣ·anta
2nd	á·dik·ṣa·s	á·dik·ṣa·tam	á·dik·ṣa·ta	á·dik·ṣa·thās	á·dik·ṣ·āthām	á·dik·ṣa·dhvam
1st	á·dik·ṣa·m	á·dik·ṣā·va	á·dik·ṣā·ma	á·dik·ṣ·i	á·dik·ṣā·vahi	á·dik·ṣā·mahi

== Future system ==
=== Simple future ===
The simple future stem is formed with the suffix -sya- or -iṣya- and the guṇa grade of the root.

From √kṛ- :

	Active			Middle		
	Singular	Dual	Plural	Singular	Dual	Plural
3rd	kar·iṣyá·ti	kar·iṣyá·tas	kar·iṣy·ánti	kar·iṣyá·te	kar·iṣy·éte	kar·iṣy·ánte
2nd	kar·iṣyá·si	kar·iṣyá·thas	kar·iṣyá·tha	kar·iṣyá·se	kar·iṣy·éthe	kar·iṣyá·dhve
1st	kar·iṣyā́·mi	kar·iṣyā́·vas	kar·iṣyā́·mas	kar·iṣy·é	kar·iṣyā́·vahe	kar·iṣyā́·mahe

=== Periphrastic future ===
The periphrastic future is formed by first deriving the agentive noun from the root using -tṛ, and attaching forms of the verb as- 'to be' as auxiliary, in the first and second persons. In the third person, the masculine form of the agentive noun stands in for all actors, masculine, feminine or neuter.

From √dā- :

	Active		
	Singular	Dual	Plural
3rd	dā·tā́	dā·tā́rau	dā·tā́ras
2nd	dā·tā́·si	dā·tā́·sthas	dā·tā́·stha
1st	dā·tā́·smi	dā·tā́·svas	dā·tā́·smas

The medio-passive forms are hardly ever found in the literature.

=== Conditional ===
There is also a conditional, formed from the future stem as the imperfect is formed from a thematic present stem. Rarely used in Classical Sanskrit, the conditional refers to hypothetical actions.

	Active			Middle		
	Singular	Dual	Plural	Singular	Dual	Plural
3rd	á·kar·iṣya·t	á·kar·iṣya·tām	á·kar·iṣya·n	á·kar·iṣya·ta	á·kar·iṣy·etām	á·kar·iṣy·anta
2nd	á·kar·iṣya·s	á·kar·iṣya·tam	á·kar·iṣya·ta	á·kar·iṣya·thās	á·kar·iṣy·ethām	á·kar·iṣya·dhvam
1st	á·kar·iṣya·m	á·kar·iṣyā·va	á·kar·iṣyā·ma	á·kar·iṣy·e	á·kar·iṣyā·vahi	á·kar·iṣyā·mahi

== Secondary Conjugation ==
Sanskrit verbs are capable of a second category of conjugation wherein the root takes on a modified or extended meaning. These are:

1. Passive
2. Intensive
3. Causative
4. Desiderative
5. Denominative

=== Passive ===
The passive is very similar in formation to the dív-class (4th) already seen above, with the primary difference that the -yá- always bears the accent. The root is in its weak form, and the middle endings are used. From √han- : (Note: kill)

	Singular	Dual	Plural
3rd	han·yá·te	han·y·éte	han·y·ánte
2nd	han·yá·se	han·y·éthe	han·yá·dhve
1st	han·y·é	han·yā́·vahe	han·yā́·mahe

=== Intensive ===
The intensive is formed by reduplicating the root and is conjugated like a class-2 verb. Thus for √vid, (Note: to know) we have véved-, vevid-:

	Singular	Dual	Plural
3rd	vévet·ti, vévid·ī·ti	vevit·tas	vévid·ati
2nd	vévet·si, véved·ī·ṣi	vevit·thás	vevit·thá
1st	véved·mi, véved·ī·mi	vevid·vás	vevid·más

== Participles ==
Participles are verbal adjectives, a form of the non-finite verb. They are derived from verb roots, but behave like adjectives.

Sanskrit inherits a highly developed system of participles from Proto-Indo-European preserving some of the more archaic features of the parent language.

Such a participial element found in almost all Indo-European languages is -nt-. This can be seen in PIE *bheront-, from *bher- 'bear', Sanskrit bharan(t)-, Greek φέρον(τ)- (pheron(t)-), Latin feren(t)-, all meaning 'bearing, carrying'.

In Sanskrit, participles exist in all three voices — active, middle and passive, and in three of the tenses — present, perfect and future. While this should logically yield 3x3=9 forms, the actual number is usually higher, because potentially at least, there are three different future passive participles and two perfect active participles. In some cases it may be lower, because a verb lacks active or middle forms.

The different possible forms for a couple of representative verbs (√nī-, nayati (Note: lead, leads) 1 & √dhā-, dadhāti (Note: put, puts) 3) can be seen below:

	Active	Middle	Passive
Present:	náy·ant-	náy·a·māna-	nī·yá·māna-
Perfect:	ninī·vā́ṅs-	niny·āná-	nī·tá-
Future:	ne·ṣy·ánt-	ne·ṣyá·māṇa-	ne·tavyá- né·ya-

	Active	Middle	Passive
Present:	dadh·át-	dadh·āná-	dhī·yá·māna-
Perfect:	dadhi·vā́ṅs-	dadh·āná-	hi·ta-
Future:	dhā·sy·ánt-	dhā·syá·māna-	dhā·tavyá- dhā·nī́ya dhé·ya-

=== Past participles ===
Past participles are formed directly from verbal roots for most verbs in most cases (except for verbs of the tenth gaṇa, which form them from the present stem). They have a perfective sense, in that they refer to actions that are completed. They can freely substitute for finite verbs conjugated in the past sense.

==== Past passive participles ====
Sanskrit inherits two suffixes from Proto-Indo-European used to form verbal adjectives and the past passive participle: *-tó- and *-nó-. The first can be seen in the root *gʷem- 'to come' (Note: the word come is both synonym and cognate) forming *gʷm̥-tó-, which in Sanskrit becomes gatá- '(having) gone', and in Latin ventus. (Note: as in the words event, convenient, etc.)

The second method is less frequent but can be seen in PIE *bʰeyd- 'to split' giving *bʰid-nó-, in Sanskrit bhin-ná- '(having been) split', cognate with English bitten.

In Sanskrit thus the past passive participle is formed by adding "-tá-", (Note: Kta in Pāṇinian terms) or "-ná-", to a root in its weakest grade when weakening is applicable (e.g. samprasāraṇa). For seṭ roots, the augment i is inserted before the suffix. The resulting form is an adjective and modifies a noun either expressed or implied.

The past passive participle can usually be translated by the corresponding English past passive participle:

- likh·i·táḥ śabdaḥ – 'the written word'
- kṛ·táṃ kāryam- 'a done deed'

Examples
Root	Stem	Final form	Glossary	Remarks
√bhū-	bhū-	bhū·tá-	been, having been	
√kṛ	kṛ	kṛ·tá-	done, having done	
√vac-	uk-	uk·tá-	spoken, said	
√vad-	ud·i-	ud·i·tá-	spoken	
√pṝ-	pūr-	pūr·ṇá-	filled, full	With irregular root modification

When used with transitive (sakarmaka) verbs, the standard passive meaning can be achieved; the agent, if used, is placed in the instrumental case:

- rākṣaso rāmeṇa hataḥ – 'The rākṣasa (demon) was killed by Rāma'

Note that rākṣasa is the direct object (karman) of the verbal action expressed in √han "to kill" and the agent (kartṛ) of the same action, Rāma, occurs in the instrumental case.

When made from an intransitive (akarmaka) or neuter verb, the same participle has no passive, but an indefinite past sense:

- rāmo vane sthitaḥ – 'Rama stood in the forest' (from √sthā – 'to stand, stay')

==== Past active participles ====
The past participle could be extended by adding the possessive suffix -vant-: kṛ·tá·vant- – 'one who has something (or things) done'.

This naturally takes on the function of the active past participle. This is a linguistic innovation within the Indo-Aryan branch, and the first purely participial formation of this character appears in the Atharvaveda.

Later on this formation (-tá·vant- or -ná·vant-) comes to be used independently, with the copula understood, in place of an active preterite:

- na mām kaścid dṛṣ·ṭá·vān – 'no one has seen me' -> 'no one saw me'.

=== Present participle ===
Unlike the past participles, the present participle is formed from the present stem of the verb, and is formed differently depending on whether the verb is parasmaipada or ātmanepada. The present participle can never substitute for a finite verb. It is also inherently imperfective, indicating an action that is still in process at the time of the main verb.

==== Present active participle ====
In theory, the present active participle is the addition of -ant to a form of the root. In practice however, this participle can simply be made by dropping the -i from the 3rd person plural in the present indicative. This gives us the masculine singular form of the participle. Thus,

- bháv·anti -> bháv·ant-
- kur·v·ánti -> kur·v·ánt-

The weak form is -at-

The feminine is formed as -antī́ in some roots, and as -atī́ in others.

==== Present middle participle ====
This participle is formed by adding -māna- to a thematic stem and -āná- to an athematic stem in the weak form. Thus for √bhū- and √kṛ-:

- bháv·a·māna-
- kur·v·āṇá-

=== Future participles ===
Formed from the future stem just as the present participle is formed from the present stem, the future participle describes an action that has not yet happened, but that may in the future.

==== Future active participle ====
Just as in the present, it can be formed by simply dropping the -i of the third-person plural. Thus,

- kar·iṣy·ánti -> kar·iṣy·ánt-
- bhav·iṣy·ánti -> bhav·iṣy·ánt-

The feminines are in either -ántī or -atī́ although the latter is extremely rare.

==== Future middle participle ====
Similarly, the middle form is obtained by adding -māna- to the future stem. So we have:

- kar·iṣyá·māṇa-
- bhav·iṣyá·māṇa-

==== Gerundive ====
The gerundive is a future passive prescriptive participle, indicating that the word modified should or ought to be the object of the action of the participle.

This is made by affixing -ya-, -távya-/-tavyà-, -anī́ya- to different stem forms. Thus for √bhū- and √kṛ-:

- bháv·ya-
- bhav·i·tavyà-
- bhav·anī́ya-
- kā́r·ya-
- kar·tavyà-
- kar·aṇī́ya-

The accent on -tavya- may fall on either syllable.

=== Perfect participle ===
The perfect participle is a past active participle, but is very rarely used in classical Sanskrit.

This is formed by adding -vā́ṅs in the active and -āná in the middle voice to the weak form of the perfect stem, as seen, for example in the third person active. The feminine forms are -uṣī́ and -ānā́. Thus,

- √bhū- -> babhū·vā́ṅs-, babhū·vāná-
- √kṛ- -> cakṛ·vā́ṅs-, cakr·āṇá-

=== Aorist participle ===
The aorist participle used rarely in Vedic was lost in Classical Sanskrit.

== Other non-finite forms ==
=== Infinitive ===
The infinitive originates as the accusative form of an old verbal noun. The ending -tum, similar to the Latin supine, is added to the root which bears the accent with its vowel guṇated. An '-i-' intervenes just like in other conjugation forms as needed.

- √bhū- -> bháv·i·tum
- √kṛ- -> kár·tum
- √gam- -> gán·tum

=== Gerund ===
There exists a non-finite form in Sanskrit termed gerund or absolutive which is analysed differently from the gerund in other Proto-Indo-European languages. It has the sense of 'having done' or whatever the verb may be.

It is formed using -tvā́ or -ya, with the former normally used on a bare root whereas the latter applied to verbs with prefixes added to the root.

The -tvā́ formation is similar to the past passive participle formed from -tá and correspondingly bears the accent. The second form can be normally derived by suffixing the root directly, with its vowel bearing the accent whilst in the weak form. A root ending in a short vowel gets an intervening -t-.

- √bhū- -> bhū·tvā́ and -bhū́·ya
- √kṛ- -> kṛ·tvā́ and -kṛ́·t·ya
- √gam- -> ga·tvā́ and -gám·ya

== Comprehensive example ==
The following table is a partial listing of the major verbal forms that can be generated from a single root. Not all roots can take all forms; some roots are often confined to particular stems. The verbal forms listed here are all in the third person singular, and they can all be conjugated in three persons and three numbers.

- Root: √bhū-, a class I thematic verb root.
- Present: bháv·a-
- Passive: bhū·yá-
- Future: bhav·iṣyá-
- Perfect: babhūv-
- Aorist: bhū-
- Desiderative: bubhū·ṣ-
- Intensive: bóbho ~ bóbhū-
- Causative: bhāv·áya-

When there are two forms in one cell of this table, the first one is active, the second one middle.

		Primary	Causative	Desiderative	Intensive
Present stem	Present	bháv·a·ti bháv·a·te	bhāv·áya·ti bhāv·áya·te	búbhū·ṣa·ti	bóbho·ti / bóbhav·ī·ti bobhū·yá·te
Present stem	Imperfect	á·bhav·a·t á·bhav·a·ta	á·bhāv·aya·t á·bhāv·aya·ta	á·bubhū·ṣa·t	á·bobho.t á·bobhū·yá·t
Present stem	Imperative	bháv·a·tu bháv·a·tām	bhāv·áya·tu bhāv·áya·tām	búbhū·ṣa·tu	bóbho·tu / bóbhav·ī·tu bobhū·yá·tām
Present stem	Optative	bháv·et bháv·e·ta	bhāv·áye·t bhāv·áye·ta	búbhū·ṣe·t	bobhav·yā́t bobhū·yé·ta
Present stem	Present participle	bháv·ant- bháv·a·māna-	bhāv·áy·ant- bhāv·áya·māna-	búbhū·ṣ·ant-	bóbhav·ant- bóbhū·ya·māna
Passive	Present	bhū·yá·te	bhāv·yá·te	bubhū·ṣ·yá·te	
Passive	Imperfect	á·bhū·ya·ta	á·bhāv·ya·ta	á·bubhū·ṣ·ya·ta	
Passive	Imperative	bhū·yá·tām	bhāv·yá·tām	bubhū·ṣ·yá·tām	
Passive	Optative	bhū·yé·ta	bhāv·yé·ta	bubhū·ṣ·yé·ta	
Passive	Passive participle	bhū·yá·māna-	bhāv·yá·māna-	bubhū·ṣ·yá·māna-	
Future stem	Future	bhav·iṣyá·ti	bhāv·ay·iṣyá-ti bhāv·ay·iṣyá·te	bubhū·ṣ·iṣyá·ti	
Future stem	Conditional	á·bhav·iṣya·t	á·bhāv·ay·iṣya·t	á·bubhū·ṣ·iṣya·t	
Future stem	Future participle	bhav·iṣyá·nt-	bhav·iṣyá·māna- bhāv·ay·iṣyá·māna-	bubhū·ṣ·iṣyá·nt-	
Periphrastic future		bhav·i·tā́	bhāv·ay·i·tā́	bubhū·ṣi·tā́	
Perfect		babhū́v·a	bhāv·áya·māsa	bubhū́·ṣā-māsa	
Aorist	Aorist	á·bhū·t			
Aorist	Benedictive / precative	bhū·yā́·t			
Aorist	Injunctive	mā bhūt			
Past participle		bhū·tá- bhū·tá·vant-	bhāv·i·tá- bhāv·i·tá·vant-	bubhū·ṣi·tá- bubhū·ṣi·tá·vant-	
Gerundive		bháv·ya- bhav·i·távya- / bhav·i·tavyà-	bhāv·ayi·távya- / bhāv·ayi·tavyà-		
Infinitive		bháv·i·tum			
Gerund		bhū·tvā́, -bhū́·ya			

Taking into account the fact that the participial forms each decline in seven cases in three numbers across three genders, and the fact that the verbs each conjugate in three persons in three numbers, the primary, causative, and desiderative stems for this root when counted together have over a thousand forms.

== See also ==
- Sanskrit nominals
- Sanskrit grammar
- Vedic Sanskrit grammar
- Proto-Indo-European verbs
- Proto-Indo-Aryan
- Proto-Indo-Iranian
- Proto-Indo-European

== Bibliography ==
- Fortson, Benjamin W (2010). Indo-European Language and Culture (2010 ed.). Wiley-Blackwell. ISBN 978-1-4051-8895-1.
- Burrow, Thomas (2001). The Sanskrit Language (2001 ed.). Motilal Banarsidass. ISBN 81-208-1767-2.
- Whitney, William Dwight (January 2008). Sanskrit Grammar (2000 ed.). Motilal Banarsidass. ISBN 978-81-208-0620-7.
- Coulson, Michael (2003). Sanskrit (2003 ed.). McGraw Hill. ISBN 0-340-85990-3.
- Bucknell, Roderick S (January 2010). Sanskrit Grammar (2000 ed.). Motilal Banarsidass. ISBN 978-81-208-1188-1.
- Macdonell, A. A. A Sanskrit Grammar for Students. London: Oxford UP, 1927. (ISBN 81-246-0094-5)
- Kale, M R (1969). A Higher Sanskrit Grammar (2002 ed.). Motilal Banarsidass. ISBN 81-208-0177-6.
- Sanskrit Grammar for Beginners - Müller F., Max - ISBN 978-12-365-2895-7
- Goldman, Robert P. & Sally J. Devavāṇīpraveśikā. Berkeley: Center for South Asian Studies, 2004. (ISBN 0-944613-40-3)
- Introduction to Indo-European Linguistics (Einführung in die vergleichende Sprachwissenschaft) – Szemerényi, Oswald J.L. – 4th Ed – Oxford University Press – ISBN 0-19-824015-5
- Meier-Brügger, Michael; Fritz, Matthias; Mayrhofer, Manfred (2003). Indo-European Linguistics. Berlin; New York: Walter de Gruyter. L 315. ISBN 3-11-017433-2.
- A Sanskrit-English Dictionary - Sir Monier Monier-Williams - Oxford Clarendon Press
- Wilson Sanskrit-English Dictionary - 1832 – Calcutta Edition
