= Vedic Sanskrit grammar =

Grammatical rules of the Vedic Sanskrit language

Vedic Sanskrit is the name given by modern scholarship to the oldest attested descendant of the Proto-Indo-Aryan language. Sanskrit is the language that is found in the four Vedas, in particular, the Rigveda, the oldest of them, dated to have been composed roughly over the period from 1500 to 1000 BCE. Before its standardization as Sanskrit, the Vedic language was a purely spoken language during that period used before the introduction of writing in the language.

The Vedic language has inherited from its ultimate-parent (the Proto-Indo-European language) an elaborate system of morphology, more of which has been preserved in Sanskrit as a whole than in other kindred languages such as Ancient Greek or Latin. Its grammar differs greatly from the later Classical Sanskrit in many regards, one being that this complex inherited morphology simplified over time.

== History ==
The language descended from the Proto-Indo-Aryan language, which entered the Indian subcontinent with the arrival of the Proto-Indo-Aryans dated to be around 1800–1500 BCE. The Vedic hymns are estimated to have been composed between 1500 and 1000 BCE, with the language of each hymn fixed at the time of its oral composition, establishing a religious canon around a literary tradition.

As the popular speech unavoidably evolved over the centuries the Vedic hymns began to be increasingly inaccessible. In order to "arrest" language change, there arose a rigorous linguistic tradition aimed at preserving the literary language, culminating in the work of Pāṇini's Aṣṭādhyayī, dated around 600–400 BCE, which marks the beginning of 'Sanskrit', referred to in contradistinction to the Vedic language as 'Classical.

Despite these efforts, by the time of Pāṇini's final definition, the language had undergone some changes, especially in grammar. The following sections will focus on these differences between the Vedic and Classical Sanskrit. Those features that were not incorporated into the Classical Language by Panini can be seen in Classical Sanskrit and related pages. (Note: Sanskrit nouns, Sanskrit verbs)

== Differences between Vedic and Classical Sanskrit ==
Over time, the language that would become Classical Sanskrit reduced and regularized much of the complex morphology that it had originally inherited from its parent the Proto-Indo-European language:

- Vedic used the older athematic approach to inflection far more than the classical language, which tended to replace them using thematic forms in their place.
- The three synthetic past tenses (imperfect, perfect and aorist) were still clearly distinguished semantically in Vedic.
  - The imperfect, perfect, and aorist didn't have the values of their English namesakes:
    - The imperfect was used as a general past tense.
    - The perfect was used like a proximal present perfect, general past, and as a present tense
    - The aorist was used like a proximal present perfect.
- A fifth mood, the subjunctive/injunctive, also existed.
- There were more than 12 ways of forming infinitives in Vedic, of which Classical Sanskrit retained only one form.
- ī-stems differentiate the devī́ and vrkī́s feminines, a difference lost in Classical Sanskrit.

== Nouns ==
=== Basics ===
Declension of a noun in Sanskrit involves the interplay of two 'dimensions': 3 numbers and 8 cases, yielding a combination of 24 possible forms, although owing to syncretism of some forms, the practical number can be lower. (Note: Though in PIE, formal gender differentiation was low, with masculine/feminine nouns showing identical inflections, and the neuter class differing from them only with regard to the nominative and accusative, in Sanskrit, nouns are classified as belonging to any one of three genders.)

In addition, adjectives behave much the same way morphologically as nouns do, and can conveniently be considered together. While the same noun cannot be seen to be of more than one gender, adjectives change gender on the basis of the noun they are being applied to, along with case and number, thus giving the following variables:

1	3 numbers	singular, dual, plural
2	3 genders	masculine, feminine, neuter
3	8 cases	nominative, accusative, instrumental, dative, ablative, genitive, locative, vocative

=== Building blocks ===
==== Roots ====
The oldest system of declension was to affix the endings directly to the nominal root. This was an ancient feature already in decline in later Proto-Indo-European. Of the daughter languages, this system has been best preserved by Vedic Sanskrit.

Ancient noun roots in kindred languages
Sanskrit	Latin	PIE	Glossary
pā́d-	pē(d)s, ped-	*póds	foot
vā́c-	vōx, vōc-	*wṓkʷs	speech
rā́j-	rēx, rēg-	*h₃rḗǵs	king, ruler

==== Stems ====
In Proto-Indo-European, a new system developed wherein an intermediary called the thematic vowel is inserted to the root before the final endings are appended: *-o- which in Sanskrit becomes -a-, producing the thematic stem.

Declension of a thematic stem is less complicated as a host of Sandhi rules apply no more, and the later stages of the Sanskrit language see an increase in the profusion of thematic nouns. Thus in classical Sanskrit, the thematic pā́da-s is more likely to be found than its athematic predecessor.

==== Cases ====
Sanskrit nouns are declined for eight cases:

- nominative: marks the subject of a verb.
- accusative: used for the direct object of a transitive verb.
- genitive: marks a noun as modifying another noun.
- dative: used to indicate the indirect object of a transitive verb.
- instrumental: marks the instrument or means by, or with, which the subject achieves or accomplishes an action.
- ablative: used to express motion away from something.
- locative: corresponds vaguely to the English prepositions in, on, at, and by.
- vocative: used for a word that identifies an addressee.

==== Endings ====
The basic scheme of suffixation is given in the table below and applies to many nouns and adjectives.

However, according to the gender and the final consonant or vowel of the uninflected word-stem, there are internal sandhi rules dictating the form of the inflected word. Furthermore, these are standalone forms, which when used in actual phrases are subject to external sandhi. (Note: such as, the mutation of -s to -ḥ or -r etc.)

	Singular		Dual		Plural	
	Masc./Fem	Neu.	Masc./Fem	Neu.	Masc./Fem	Neu.
Nominative	-s	-Ø	-au	-ī	-as	-i
Accusative	-am	-Ø	-au	-ī	-as	-i
Instrumental	-ā		-bhyām		-bhis	
Dative	-e		-bhyām		-bhyas	
Ablative	-as		-bhyām		-bhyas	
Genitive	-as		-os		-ām	
Locative	-i		-os		-su	

=== Root Declension ===
This is the old athematic method of Proto-Indo-European declension still in active use in Vedic. (Note: Macdonnell (1910) §6.) (Note: Note how the vowel in pád- is elongated when accented.)

Consonant-stem singular
Case	Std Ending	pád-	vā́c-	rā́j-	mā́s- (Note: month m.)	víś- (Note: settlement, -wich f.)
Nominative, Vocative	-s	pā́t	vā́k	rā́ṭ	mā́s	víṭ
Accusative	-am	pā́d·am	vā́c·am	rā́j·am	mā́s·am	víś·am
Instrumental	-ā	pad·ā́	vāc·ā́	ráj·ā	mā́s·ā	viś·ā́
Dative	-e	pad·é	vāc·é	rā́j·e	mā́s·e	viś·é
Ablative, Genitive	-as	pad·ás	vāc·ás	rā́j·as	mā́s·as	viś·ás
Locative	-i	pad·í	vāc·í	rā́j·i	mā́s·i	viś·í

Consonant-stem dual
Case	Std Ending	pád-	vā́c-	rā́j-	mā́s-	vís-
Nominative; Accusative; Vocative	-au	pā́d·au	vā́c·au	rā́j·au	mā́s·ā	viś·ā
Instrumental; Dative; Ablative	-bhyām	pad·bhyā́m	vāg·bhyā́m	rā́g·bhyām	mā́d·bhyām	viḍ·bhyā́m
Genitive; Locative	-os	pad·ós	vāc·ós	rā́j·os	mā́s·os	viś·ós

Consonant-stem plural
Case	Std Ending	pád-	vā́c-	rā́j-	mā́s-	víś-
Nominative, Vocative	-as	pā́d·as	vā́c·as	rā́j·as	mā́s·as	víś·as
Accusative	-as	pad·ás	vāc·ás	rā́j·as	mās·ás	víś·as
Instrumental	-bhis	pad·bhís	vāg·bhís	rā́g·bhis	mād·bhís	viḍ·bhís
Dative; Ablative	-bhyas	pad·bhyás	vāg·bhyás	rā́g·bhyas	mād·bhyás	viḍ·bhyás
Genitive	-ām	pad·ā́m	vāc·ā́m	rā́j·ām	mās·ā́m	viś·ā́m
Locative	-su	pat·sú	vāk·ṣú	rā́k·ṣu	mās·su	vik·ṣú

=== Root ī-stem, vṛkī́s and devī́- feminines ===
A group of 80 polysyllabic ī-stems, most of which are feminine, are accented on the final vowel. Known as vṛkī́s feminines, these exhibit different behavior during declension compared to the later language, such as the nominative singular retaining the -s ending, and in the accent staying on the -i-.

Further, a number of largely feminine ī-stems, known as the devī́-feminines, also exhibit some differences compared to the later language.

These, along with root stems in -ī, (Note: the change of -ī to -iy- applies only to these) can be seen below: (Note: Macdonnell (1910), §375–376.) (Note: Macdonnell, §100.)

Root ī-stem singular
Case	Std Ending	Treatment	Ending	dhī́- (Note: thought, f)	rathī́- (Note: charioteer, m.f.)	devī́- (Note: goddess, f)
Nominative, Vocative	-s		-s	dhī́·s	rathī́·s	devī́
Accusative	-am	short(i) + y + -am	-iyam	dhíy·am	rathí·am	devī́·m
Instrumental	-ā	short(i) + y + ā	-iyā	dhiy·ā́	rathí·ā	devy·ā́
Dative	-e	(y)	-ye	dhiy·é	rathí·e	devy·aí
Ablative, Genitive	-as	(y)	-yas	dhiy·ás	rathí·ás	devy·ā́s
Locative	-i	–				devy·ā́m

Root ī-stem dual
Case	Std Ending	Treatment	Ending	dhī-	rathī́-	devī́-
Nominative; Accusative; Vocative	-au	~~-au~~ -ā	-ā	dhi·yā́	rathí·ā	devī́
Instrumental; Dative; Ablative	-bhyām	–	-bhyām	dhī·bhyā́m	rathī́·bhyām	deví·bhyām
Genitive; Locative	-os	–	-os	dhiy·ós	rathí·os	devy·ós

Root ī-stem plural
Case	Std Ending	Treatment	Ending	dhī-	rathī́-	devī́-
Nominative, Vocative	-as	(y)	-as	dhíy·as	rathí·as	devī́·s
Accusative	-as	(y)	-s	dhíy·as	rathí·s	devī́·s
Instrumental	-bhis	–	-bhis	dhī·bhís	rathī́·bhs	devī́·bhis
Dative; Ablative	-bhyas	–	-bhyas		rathī́·bhyas	devī́·bhyas
Genitive	-ām	(n)	-nām	dhī·nā́m	rathī́·nā́m	devī́·nām
Locative	-su	–	-su	dhī·sú	rathī́·ṣu	devī́·ṣu

== Compounds ==
Vedic Sanskrit inherits from the Proto-Indo-European period the ability to combine two or more words into a single one treated as a simple word with regard to accent, inflexion and construction.

The Vedic language, both in the frequency and the length of the compounds is very similar to the Greek of Homer. In the Rigveda and the Atharvaveda, no compounds of more than 3 independent members are found, and even compounds of 3 members are rare: pūrva·kāma·kṛ́tvan, "fulfilling former wishes." In the later language, both the frequency and the number of words used to form compounds greatly increases.

The main types of compound-forming were the co-ordinative, (Note: dvandva) determinative, (Note: tatpuruṣa) possessive, (Note: bahuvrīhi) and the adverbial. (Note: avyayībhava)

== Verbs ==
=== Basics ===
Verb conjugation in Sanskrit involves the interplay of number (Note: vacana), person (Note: puruṣa), voice (Note: prayoga), mood (Note: artha) and tense (Note: kāla), with the following variables:

1	3 numbers	singular (Note: eka·vacana), dual (Note: dvi·vacana), plural (Note: bahu·vacana)
2	3 persons	first (Note: not found in the imperative) (Note: prathama·puruṣa), second (Note: dvitīya·puruṣa), third (Note: tṛtīya·puruṣa)
3	3 voices	active (Note: kartari·prayoga), middle (Note: karmaṇi·prayoga), passive (Note: bhāve·prayoga)
4	5 moods	indicative, optative, imperative, conditional, subjunctive/injunctive (Note: Vedic-only)
5	6 tenses	present, imperfect, perfect, aorist, future, periphrastic future

Further, participles are considered part of the verbal systems although they are not verbs themselves, and as with other Sanskrit nouns, they can be declined across seven or eight cases, for three genders and three numbers.

As many as a dozen types of infinitives can be found in Vedic, although only a couple of types are frequent.

=== Building blocks ===
==== Stem formation ====
The starting point for conjugation is the root. As a first step, the root may be subject to treatment to form a stem, to which personal endings are suffixed. The types of possible treatment are:

- Suffixion: the theme vowel -a- may be appended, or one of several other suffixes -ya-, -ó- / -nó-, -nā-, and -aya-.
- Infixion: A nasal infix (n, ñ, ṇ, ṅ) may be inserted within the root, which when accented is -ná-.
- The root may undergo reduplication.
- In some tenses or moods, the augment á- may be prefixed.
- In many cases, the accent may vary between the root and the ending, accompanied by corresponding changes in the gradation of the root vowel.

If V is the vowel of the zero grade, the guṇa-grade vowel is traditionally thought of as a + V, and the vṛddhi-grade vowel as ā + V.

Grades
Vowel (zero) grade	a, –	i, ī	u, ū	ṛ, ṝ	ḷ, ḹ
Short diphthong (Guṇa) grade	a, ai	ai	au	ar	al
Long diphthong (Vṛddhi) grade	ā, āi	āi	āu	ār	āl

==== Personal endings ====
Conjugational endings in Vedic convey person, number, and voice. Different forms of the endings are used depending on what tense stem and mood they are attached to. Verb stems or the endings themselves may be changed or obscured by sandhi.

The primary, secondary, perfect and imperative endings are essentially the same as seen in Classic Sanskrit. The subjunctive endings can be seen below:

	Person	Active			Middle		
	Person	Singular	Dual	Plural	Singular	Dual	Plural
Subjunctive	1.	-ā, -āni	-vá	-má	-āi	-váhāi	-máhāi, -máhai
Subjunctive	2.	-si, -s	-thás	-thá	-sāi, -sái	-ā́ithai	-dhvā́i
Subjunctive	3.	-ti, -t	-tás	-(á)n	-tāi, -tái	-ā́itai	-ántai, -ánta

Primary endings are used with present indicative and future forms. Secondary endings are used with the imperfect, conditional, aorist, and optative. Perfect, imperative and subjunctive endings are used with the perfect, imperative and subjunctive respectively. There are additional 'a' inserted between the root and the ending, often causing an elongation with a root class' other suffux (bhū (bhav) + a + a + ti = bhavāti).

=== Conjugation ===
==== Present system ====
The present system includes the present tense, the imperfect, and the optative, imperative and subjunctive moods, and well as rare occurrences of injunctive. The present system conjugations are generally homogeneous with that Classical Sanskrit, see there.

==== Perfect system ====
The perfect is used mainly in the indicative. The stem is formed with reduplication as with the present system.

The perfect system also produces separate "strong" and "weak" forms of the verb — the strong form is used with the singular active, and the weak form with the rest.

The perfect in the Sanskrit can be in form of the simple perfect and the periphrastic perfect.

The Simple Perfect can form an augmented Pluperfect (which is equivalent in value to the imperfect), and beyond the indicative mood it can also form Perfect Subjunctives, Optatives, and Imperatives. All of these are lost in Classical Sanskrit, which forms only indicatives.

The simple perfect is the most common form and can be made from most of the roots. The simple perfect stem is made by reduplication and if necessary by stem lengthening. The conjugated form takes special perfect endings. The periphrastic perfect is used with causative, desiderative, denominative and roots with prosodic long anlauted vowel (except a/ā). Only few roots can form both the simple and the periphrastic perfect. These are bhṛ 'carry', uṣ 'burn', vid 'know', bhi 'to be afraid', hu 'sacrifice'.

==== Aorist system ====
The aorist system includes aorist proper (with a proximal perfect past indicative meaning, e.g. akārṣīḥ 'you have done' or 'you did (just now)') and some of the forms of the ancient injunctive (used almost exclusively with mā in prohibitions, e.g. mā bhūḥ 'don't be'). The principal distinction of the two is presence/absence of an augment – a- prefixed to the stem. The Aorist also had subjunctive, imperative, and optative forms. Of these, only the optative was preserved in Classical, forming the benedictive (also called the precative) mood.

The aorist system stem actually has three different formations: the simple aorist, the reduplicating aorist (semantically related to the causative verb), and the sibilant aorist. The simple aorist is taken directly from the root stem (e.g. bhū-: a-bhū-t 'he was'). The reduplicating aorist involves reduplication as well as vowel reduction of the stem. The sibilant aorist is formed with the suffixation of s to the stem. The sibilant aorist by itself has four formations:

- athematic s-aorist
- athematic iṣ-aorist
- athematic siṣ-aorist
- thematic s-aorist

==== Future system ====
The s-future is formed with the inffixion of -syá- or -iṣyá- before the normal present endings and guṇa. It is generally the more common, with the indication of a simple future. The periphrastic future is formed with the suffix of tṛ́ added directly to the root with guṇa. In the third person, it is conjugated like a noun ending in ṛ; the other forms use the nominal form periphrasticly and add the corresponding as forms. It is used to refer to a task that will be completed at a specific time in the future.

The s-future also contains a preterite formation using the same endings as the imperfect, while also using the -syá- or -iṣyá- infix. This future preterite is used for conditional sentences and clauses. Other than this, Vedic had a small scattering of imperative and optative future forms. However, they were completely phased out as the language continued to evolve.

=== Examples of conjugation ===
Comprehensive conjugation tables can be found in the Classical Sanskrit page linked above. Some notes on elements specific to Vedic Sanskrit below:

bhū – 'to be'

The optative takes secondary endings. -ya- is added to the stem both in the active and the middle. In some forms the cluster ya is dropped out.

Optative
Person	Active			Middle		
Person	Singular	Dual	Plural	Singular	Dual	Plural
1.	bhávaiyām	bhávai(yā)va	bhávai(yā)ma	bhávaiya(m)	bhávai(yā)vahi	bhávai(yā)mahi
2.	bhávai(ya)s	bhávai(ya)tam	bhávai(ya)ta	bhávai(ya)thās	bhávaiyāthām	bhávai(ya)dhvam
3.	bhávai(ya)t	bhávai(ya)tām	bhávaiyus	bhávai(ya)ta	bhávaiyātām	bhávairan

The subjunctive takes subjunctive endings.

Subjunctive
Person	Active			Middle		
Person	Singular	Dual	Plural	Singular	Dual	Plural
1.	bhávā(ni)	bhávāva	bhávāma	bháv(ām)āi	bhávāvahāi	bhávāmahāi
2.	bhávās(i)	bhávāthas	bhávātha	bhávāsai / -āi	bhávāithai	bhávādhvāi
3.	bhávāt(i)	bhávātas	bhávān	bhávātai / -āi	bhávāitai	bhávāntāi / bhávanta

The following stems can take all endings.

Other stems
Passive	Causative	Desiderative	Intensive
bhūya-	bhāvaya-	bubhūṣa-	baubhavī-

as – 'to be'

Present, Indicative
Person	Active		
Person	Singular	Dual	Plural
1.	ásmi	svás	smás
2.	ási	sthás	sthá
3.	ásti	stás	sánti

Imperfect, Indicative
Person	Active		
Person	Singular	Dual	Plural
1.	ā́sam	ā́sva	ā́sma
2.	ā́sīs	ā́stam	ā́sta
3.	ā́sīt	ā́stām	ā́san

== Infinitives ==
The most notable difference between Vedic and Classical Sanskrit is in the area of the infinitive. Against the single type of infinitive in the later language, there exist, in Vedic, several forms, all of them being old cases of verbal nouns.

The following main types of infinitive can be identified in Vedic, noted in descending order of frequency:

- Dative
- Accusative
- Ablative-genitive
- Locative

=== Dative infinitive ===
The ending used to form this adjective is -e. (Note: which when following a root ending in -ā results in -ai) The ending may be directly added to the root, whether of a simple or compounded verb, or additional elements (-as-, -i, -ti, -tu, -tavā, -tyā, -dhyā, -man, -van) may be interspersed in different cases of roots.

- Plain
- √bhū- bhuv·é, -bhv·e (Note: compound form)
- √hi-, pra·hy·è (Note: to send)
- drś·é (Note: to see)
- bhuj·é (Note: to enjoy)
- -grábh·e (Note: to grab)
- -vā́c·e (Note: to speak)
- pṛ́ch·e (Note: to ask)
- -as- forms
- cákṣ·as·e (Note: to see)
- car·ás·e (Note: to fare)
- bhīy·ás·e (Note: to fear)
- puṣy·ás·e (Note: to strive)
- śriy·ás·e (Note: to be resplendent)
- -i- forms
- dṛś·áy·e
- yudh·áy·e (Note: to fight)
- gṛh·ay·e (Note: to grab)
- cit·áy·e (Note: to understand)
- -ti- forms
- iṣ·ṭáy·e (Note: to refresh)
- pī·táy·e (Note: to drink)
- -tu- forms
- át·tav·e (Note: to eat)
- é·tav·e
- kár·tav·e (Note: to make)
- gán·tav·e
- pā́·tav·e (Note: to drink)
- bhár·tav·e (Note: to bear)
- vák·tav·e (Note: to speak)
- jīv·ā́·tav·e (Note: to live)
- -tu- forms (Note: note the double accent)
- gán·tavaí
- pā́·tavaí
- mán·tavaí (Note: to think)
- -man- forms
- dā́·man·e (Note: cf Greek: δό·μεν·αι)
- vid·mań·e (Note: to know) (Note: cf Greek: ἴδ·μεν·αι)
- -van- forms
- dā·ván·e
- dhū́r·vaṇ·e (Note: to injure)

=== Accusative infinitive ===
The ending used here is either -am affixed to the weak form of a root, or -tum just as in the Latin supine. The latter form is the only one that survives in Classical Sanskrit.

- -am forms
- sam·pṛ́ch·am (Note: to ask)
- ā·rábh·am (Note: to reach)
- śúbh·am (Note: to shine)
- √tṝ – pra·tír·am (Note: to prolong)
- prati·dhā́·m (Note: to place upon)
- -tum forms
- dā́·tum (Note: to give)
- práṣ·ṭum (Note: to ask)
- prá·bhar·tum (Note: to present)
- át·tum (Note: to eat)
- dráṣ·ṭum (Note: to see)

=== Ablative-genitive infinitive ===
This functions more as a verbal noun than a genuine infinitive. There are again two ways of forming this: -as or -tos.

- -as forms
- ā·tṛ́d·as (Note: being pierced)
- ava·pád·as (Note: to falling down)
- abhi·śríṣ·as (Note: binding)
- ati·skád·as (Note: leaping across)
- -tos forms
- gán·tos (Note: going)
- ján·i·tos (Note: being born)
- ní·dhā·tos (Note: putting down)
- śár·ī·tos (Note: shattered)

=== Locative infinitive ===
This is very rare, even in the oldest language. Between the root and the locative ending -i, -tar- or -san- may be inserted.

- sam·cákṣ·i (Note: on beholding)
- drś·í (Note: on seeing)
- budh·í (Note: at the waking)
- dhar·tár·i (Note: to support)
- ne·ṣáṇ·i (Note: to lead)
- par·ṣáṇ·i (Note: to pass)

== Syntax ==
Because of Vedic's complex declension system the word order is free (with tendency toward SOV).

== Sample ==
Sample Vedic Sanskrit text with accentuation etc.: (this is from the Vagambrini suktam)

The Ṛg-Veda, X. 125

aháṃ rudráibʰir·vásubʰiś·carāmy·ahám·ādityāír·utá viśvá·daivāiḥ,
aháṃ mitrā́váruṇau 'bʰā́ bibʰarmy·aham·indrāgní ahám·aśvínau 'bʰā́,

aháṃ sáumam·āhanásam bibʰarmy·ahám·tváṣṭāram·utá pūṣáṇam bʰagám,
ahám dadʰāmi dráviṇaṃ havíṣmatai suprāvyài yájamānāya sunvatái.

aháṃ ṛā́ṣṭrī saṅgámanī vásūnāṃ cikitúṣī prathamā́ yajñíyānām,
tā́m mā daivā́ vy·àdadʰuḥ purutā́ bʰū́ristʰātrām bʰū́ry·āvaiśáyantīm.

máyā sáu ánnam·atti yáu vipáśyati yaḥ prā́ṇiti yá īṃ śṛṇáuty·uktám,
amántavau mā́m tá úpa kṣiyanti śrudʰí śruta śraddʰiváṃ tai vadāmi.

—
Translation:
English

I roam with the Rudras (Note: storm-Gods) and the Vasus, I with the Ādityas and the all-Gods,
I bear both Mitra–Varuna I Indra and Agni, (Note: the fire-God) I both the Aśvins. (Note: the divine twins)

I bear the swollen Soma, I Tvaṣṭā and Pūṣā and Bhaga,
I establish wealth for the man offering the oblation, who pursues well, who sacrifices and presses. (Note: presses/extracts the soma juice)

I am ruler, assembler of goods, observer foremost among those deserving the sacrifice,
Me have the gods distributed in many places – so that I have many stations and cause many things to enter (me).

Through me he eats food – whoever sees, whoever breathes, whoever hears what is spoken,
Without thinking about it, they live on me. Listen, o you who are listened to: it's a trustworthy thing I tell you.

—

== See also ==
- Sanskrit grammar
- Sanskrit nouns
- Sanskrit verbs
- Classical Sanskrit
- Vedic accent
- Proto-Indo-Aryan language
- Proto-Indo-Iranian language
- Proto-Indo-European language

== Bibliography ==
- Ernst Wilhelm Oskar Windisch, Berthold Delbrück, Die altindische Wortfolge aus dem Catagathabrahmana
- Arthur Anthony Macdonell, Vedic Grammar (1910)
- Arthur Anthony MacDonell, A Vedic Grammar for Students. Bombay, Oxford University Press. (1916/1975)
- Bruno Lindner, 'Altindische Nominalbildung: Nach den S̆amhitas dargestellt (1878)
- Michael Witzel, Tracing the Vedic dialects in Dialectes dans les litteratures Indo-Aryennes ed. Caillat, Paris, 1989, 97–265.
- Müller M., Sanskrit Grammatik, Leipzig (1868)
- Renou L., Grammaire de la langue védique, Paris (1952)
- William Dwight Whitney, Sanskrit Grammar. 5th edn. Delhi: Motilal Banarsidass Publishers. (1924) [1st ed. 1879]
- Coulson, Michael, Sanskrit (teach yourself), McGraw Hill (2003)
- Fortson IV, Benjamin W – Indo-European Language and Culture – 2nd Ed – Wiley-Blackwell (2010) – ISBN 978-1-4051-8896-8
- Burrow, T – The Sanskrit Language – ISBN 81-208-1767-2
- Bucknell, Roderick S – Sanskrit Grammar – ISBN 81-208-1188-7
- Reich, David – Who we are and how we got here – 1st End – (2019) – ISBN 978-1-101-87346-5
- Jamison, Stephanie W., Brereton, Joel P., The Rigveda, Oxford University Press, 2020 ISBN 978-0-190-63336-3
- Beekes, Robert (1995). Comparative Indo-European Linguistics. J. Benjamins Pub. ISBN 1-55619-504-4.
