= Sanskrit nominals =

Aspect of Sanskrit grammar

Sanskrit has an elaborate system of nominal morphology. Endings may be added directly to the root, or more frequently and especially in the later language, to a stem formed by the addition of a suffix to it.

Sanskrit is a highly inflected language that preserves all the declensional types found in Proto-Indo-European, including a few residual heteroclitic r/n-stems.

== Basics ==
Declension of a noun in Sanskrit (Note: called sup or sub·anta by Pāṇini) involves the interplay of two 'dimensions': three numbers and eight cases, yielding a combination of 24 possible forms, although owing to syncretism of some forms, the practical number is around 18 or so. Further, nouns themselves in Sanskrit, like its parent Proto-Indo-European, can be in one of three genders.

In addition, adjectives behave much the same way morphologically as nouns do, and can conveniently be considered together. While the same noun cannot be seen to be of more than one gender, adjectives change gender on the basis of the noun they are being applied to, along with case and number, thus giving the following variables:

1	3 numbers (Note: vacana)	singular (Note: eka·vacana), dual (Note: dvi·vacana), plural (Note: bahu·vacana)
2	3 genders (Note: liṅga)	masculine (Note: puṃ·liṅga), feminine (Note: strī·liṅga), neuter (Note: napuṃsaka·liṅga)
3	8 cases (Note: vibhakti)	nominative, accusative, instrumental, dative, ablative, genitive, locative, vocative

== Building blocks ==
=== Roots ===
The oldest system of declension was to affix the endings (Note: prātipadika – when any declinable has not yet been declined) directly to the nominal root. This was an ancient feature already in decline in later Proto-Indo-European. Of the daughter languages, this system has been best preserved by Sanskrit, especially the older form of Indo-Aryan termed Vedic Sanskrit.

Ancient noun roots in kindred languages
Sanskrit	Latin	PIE	Gloss
pā́d-	pē(d)s, ped-	*póds	foot (Note: also cognate)
vā́c-	vōx, vōc-	*wṓkʷs	speech
rā́j-	rēx, rēg-	*h₃rḗǵs	king, ruler

=== Stems ===
In Proto-Indo-European, a new system developed wherein an intermediary called the thematic vowel is inserted to the root before the final endings are appended: *-o- which in Sanskrit becomes -a-, producing the thematic stem.

Declension of a thematic stem is less complicated as a host of Sandhi rules apply no more, and the later stages of the Sanskrit language see an increase in the profusion of thematic nouns. Thus in classical Sanskrit, the thematic pā́da-s is more likely to be found than its athematic predecessor.

$$\underbrace{\underbrace{\mathrm{root+suffix}}_{\mathrm{stem}} + \mathrm{ending}}_{\mathrm{word}}$$

=== Cases ===
Sanskrit nouns are declined for eight cases:

- nominative: marks the subject of a verb.
- accusative: used for the direct object of a transitive verb.
- instrumental: marks the means by which the subject achieves or accomplishes an action, physically or abstractly.
- dative: used to indicate the indirect object of a transitive verb.
- ablative: used to express motion away from something.
- genitive: marks a noun as modifying another noun.
- locative: corresponds vaguely to the English prepositions in, on, at, and by.
- vocative: used for a word that identifies an addressee.

==== The kāraka classification ====
In the ancient literature, Pāṇini identified six classes as kārakas, (Note: 'actors') operating as accessories to a verb. The six kārakas are the nominative, accusative, instrumental, dative, ablative, and locative cases. He defined them as follows (Aṣtādhyāyi, I.4.24–54):

1. Kartā : (Note: 'agent') 'he/that which is independent in action'. This is equivalent to the nominative case.
2. Karman : (Note: 'deed'/'object') 'what the agent seeks most to attain': the accusative.
3. Karaṇa (Note: 'instrument') 'that which effects most': the instrumental.
4. Sampradāna : (Note: 'bestowal') 'he whom one aims at with the object': the dative.
5. Apādāna : (Note: lit. 'take off') '(that which is) firm when departure (takes place)': the ablative.
6. Adhikaraṇa : (Note: 'location') or 'substratum': the locative.

Pāṇini did not identify the genitive Sambandha and vocative Sambodhana as kārakas.

=== Endings ===
The basic scheme of suffixation (Note: "su·au·jas am·auṭ·śas ṭā·bʰyām·bʰis ṅe·bʰyām·bʰyas ṅasi·bʰyām·bʰyas ṅas·os·ām ṅi·os·sup" – Pāṇini IV 1.2.) is given in the table below and applies to many nouns and adjectives.

However, according to the gender and the final consonant or vowel of the uninflected word-stem, there are internal sandhi rules dictating the form of the inflected word. Furthermore, these are standalone forms, which when used in actual phrases are subject to external sandhi, such as, the mutation of -s to -ḥ or -r and so on.

	Singular		Dual		Plural	
	Masc./Fem	Neu.	Masc./Fem	Neu.	Masc./Fem	Neu.
Nominative	-s	-∅	-au	-ī	-as	-i
Accusative	-am	-∅	-au	-ī	-as	-i
Instrumental	-ā		-bhyām		-bhis	
Dative	-e		-bhyām		-bhyas	
Ablative	-as		-bhyām		-bhyas	
Genitive	-as		-os		-ām	
Locative	-i		-os		-su	
Vocative	-∅		-au	-ī	-as	-i

== Declension ==
=== Classification ===
Substantives may be divided into different classes on the basis of the stem vowel before they are declined on the above basis. The general classification is:

- Short-vowel stems
  - a-stems
  - i/u-stems
  - ṛ-stems
- Long-vowel stems
  - ā-stems
  - ī/ū-stems
- Diphthong stems
- Consonant stems
  - Bare stems (root-stems)
  - as/is/us-stems
  - an/in-stems
  - ant/mant/vant-stems (present active participles, etc.)
  - vāṃs-stems (perfect active participles)

When the nominal endings are being affixed to a noun of each class, they may undergo, in some cases, some changes, including being entirely replaced by other forms. This happens most profusely in the a-stem class. However, for reasons noted below, grammars both traditional and modern tend to start with this class.

=== a-stems ===
The vast majority of nouns in Sanskrit belong to this class, and are masculine or neuter. The position of the accent is maintained throughout, except in the masculine vocative singular. The paradigms are illustrated in their pre-sandhi forms, along with the formation treatment using two stems in the masculine devá- (Note: a god) (Note: cognate with Latin 'deus'; 'deity' & 'divine') and kā́ma- (Note: love) and two in the neuter yugá- (Note: yoke) and phála- (Note: a fruit) with different syllables accented.

a-stem adjectives are also to be found in big numbers, they are invariably masculine or neuter – feminines being formed either in -ā or, less frequently -ī. a-stem adjectives are also declined as below.

a-stem masc singular
Case	Std Ending	Treatment	Ending	dev·á-	kā́m·a-
Nominative	-s	-a- + -s	-as	dev·á·s	kā́m·a·s
Accusative	-am	-a- + -~~a~~m	-am	dev·á·m	kā́m·a·m
Instrumental	-ā	~~-ā~~ -ena	-ena	dev·éna	kā́m·ena
Dative	-e	-a- + -a- + e + a	-āya	dev·ā́ya	kā́m·āya
Ablative	-as	~~-as~~ -āt	-āt	dev·ā́t	kā́m·āt
Genitive	-as	-as + ya	-asya	dev·ásya	kā́m·asya
Locative	-i	-a- + -i	-e	dev·é	kā́m·e
Vocative (Note: recessive accent shift)	-Ø	–	-a	dév·a	kā́m·a

a-stem masc dual
Case	Std Ending	Treatment	Ending	dev·á-	kā́m·a-
Nominative; Accusative; Vocative	-au	-au	-au	dev·áu	kā́m·au
Instrumental; Dative; Ablative	-bhyām	-ā- + bhyām	-ābhyām	dev·ā́bhyām	kā́m·ābhyām
Genitive; Locative	-os	-a- + -y- + -os	-ayos	dev·á·yos	kā́m·a·yos

a-stem masc plural
Case	Std Ending	Treatment	Ending	dev·á-	kā́m·a-
Nominative, Vocative	-as	-a- + -as	-ās	dev·ā́s	kā́m·ās
Accusative	-as	~~as~~ -ān (-āṅs)	-ān (-āṅs (Note: the historical form resurfaces in certain environments, e.g., dev·āṅs·ca, seemingly, and misleadingly, as if it were a sandhi rule))	dev·ā́n	kā́m·ān
Instrumental	-bhis	~~-bhis~~ -ais	-ais	dev·aís	kā́m·ais
Dative; Ablative	-bhyas	-a- + -i- + -bhyas	-ebhyas	dev·ébhyas	kā́m·ebhyas
Genitive	-ām	-ā- + -n- + ām	-ānām	dev·ā́nām	kā́m·ānām
Locative	-su	-a- + -i- + su	-eṣu	dev·éṣu	kā́m·eṣu

Neuters only differ from the masculine in the nominative, accusative and vocative forms, the three forms always being the same:

a-stem neuter sing, dual, plu
Case	Std Ending	Treatment	Ending	yug·á-	phál·a-
Nom, Acc, Voc SG	-Ø	-a- + -m	-am	yug·á·m	phál·a·m
Nom, Acc, Voc DU	-ī	-a- + -ī	-e	yug·é	phál·e
Nom, Acc, Voc PL	-i	-a- + an + -i	-āni	yug·ā́ni	phál·āni

=== i- and u-stems ===
==== i-stems ====
Final i-stem endings are closer to the standard set compared to the a-stem declension. In general, the -i is gunated in some cases, and -n- is inserted intervocalically between the stem and the ending in a few other cases, especially in the neuter. The paradigms are illustrated here in their pre-sandhi forms for masculine agní- , (Note: fire) (Note: cognate with Latin igni- ⇒ ignition) feminine gáti- (Note: gait) and neuter vā́ri- . (Note: water)

i-stem masc/fem
Case	Std Ending	Treatment	Ending	agní-	gáti-
Nom	-s	–	-s	agní·s	gáti·s
Acc	-am	-~~a~~m	-m	agní·m	gáti·m
Ins	-ā	-n- + -ā –	-nā -ā	agní-nā	gáty·ā
Da	-e	guna(i) + e	-aye	agn·áy·e	gát·ay·e
Abl, Gen	-as	guna(i) + s -i- + -a- + -as	-es (Note: fem either form)	agn·és	gát·es gáty·ās
Loc	-i	~~-i~~ -au	-au	agn·aú	gát·au
Voc	-Ø	–	-e	ágn·e	gát·e
Case	Std Ending	Treatment	Ending	agní-	gáti-
N.A.V	-au	~~-au~~ -ī	-ī	agn·ī́	gát·ī
I.D.A	-bhyām	–	-bhyām	agní·bhyām	gáti·bhyām
Gen, Loc	-os	-i- + -os	-yos	agny·ós	gáty·os
Case	Std Ending	Treatment	Ending	agní-	gáti-
Nom, Voc	-as	guna(i) + -as	-ayas	agn·áy·as	gát·ay·as
Acc	-as	~~as~~ -īn (-īṅs)	-īn (-īṅs)	agn·ī́n	gát·īn
Ins	-bhis	–	-bhis	agní·bhis	gáti·bhis
Dat, Abl	-bhyas	–	-bhyas	agní·bhyas	gáti·bhyas
Gen	-ām	-ī + -n- ām	-īnām	agn·īnā́m	gát·īnām
Loc	-su	–	-su	agní·ṣu	gáti·ṣu

Neuters as always remain identical in the nominative and accusative, and also in the vocative. In the other cases, a -n- (Note: a common feature for i-, u- and ṛ-stem neuters) (Note: "iko'ci vibʰaktau" – Pāṇini VII 1.73) is inserted between the stem and the standard endings in all those cases where to avoid a collision of two vowels, making the whole process almost perfectly straightforward.

i-stem neut
Case	Std Ending	Treatment	Ending	vā́ri-
N.A.V	-Ø	–	-Ø	vā́ri
Ins	-ā	-n-	-nā	vā́ri·ṇ·ā
Dat	-e	-n-	-ne	vā́ri·ṇ·e
Abl, Gen	-as	-n-	-nas	vā́ri·ṇ·as
Loc	-i	-n-	-ni	vā́ri·ṇ·i
Case	Std Ending	Treatment	Ending	vā́ri-
N.A.V	-ī	-n-	-nī	vā́ri·ṇ·ī
I.D.A	-bhyām	–	-bhyām	vā́ri·bhyām
Gen, Loc	-os	-n-	-nos	vā́ri·ṇ·os
Case	Std Ending	Treatment	Ending	vā́ri-
N.A.V	-i	-īni	-īni	vā́rī·ṇ·i
Ins	-bhis	–	-bhis	vā́ri·bhis
Dat, Abl	-bhyas	–	-bhyas	vā́ri·bhyas
Gen	-ām	-ī + -n- ām	-īnām	vā́r·īṇām
Loc	-su	–	-su	vā́ri·ṣu

==== u-stems ====
i- and u-stem declensions are so similar that they can be grouped together. The u-stem paradigms illustrated here in their pre-sandhi forms are for masculine śátru- , (Note: enemy) feminine dhenú- (Note: cow) and neuter mádhu- . (Note: honey, mead)

u-stem masc/fem
Case	Std Ending	Treatment	Ending	śátru-	dhenú-
Nom	-s	–	-s	śátru·s	dhenú·s
Acc	-am	-~~a~~m	-m	śátru·m	dhenú·m
Ins	-ā	-n- + -ā –	-nā -ā	śátru-ṇā	dhenv·ā̀
Dat	-e	guna(u) + e	-ave	śátr·av·e	dhen·áv·e
Abl, Gen	-as	guna(u) + s -u- + -a- + -as	-os	śátr·os	dhen·ós dhenv·ā̀s
Loc	-i	~~-i~~ -au	-au	śátr·au	dhen·aú
Voc	-Ø	–	-o	śátr·o	dhen·ó
Case	Std Ending	Treatment	Ending	śátru-	dhenú-
N.A.V	-au	~~-au~~ -ū	-ū	śátr·ū	dhen·ū́
I.D.A	-bhyām	–	-bhyām	śátru·bhyām	dhenú·bhyām
Gen, Loc	-os	-u- + -os	-vos	śátrv·os	dhenv·ós
Case	Std Ending	Treatment	Ending	śátru-	dhenú-
Nom, Voc	-as	guna(u) + -as	-avas	śátr·av·as	dhen·áv·as
Acc	-as	~~as~~ -ūn (-ūṅs) -ūs	-ūn (-ūṅs) -ūs	śátr·ūn	dhen·ū́s
Ins	-bhis	–	-bhis	śátru·bhis	dhenú·bhis
Dat, Abl	-bhyas	–	-bhyas	śátru·bhyas	dhenú·bhyas
Gen	-ām	-ū + -n- ām	-ūnām	śátr·ūṇām	dhen·ūnā́m
Loc	-su	–	-su	śátru·ṣu	dhenú·ṣu

Neuters are also just as straightforward as for i-stems.

u-stem neut
Case	Std Ending	Treatment	Ending	mádhu-
N.A.V	-Ø	–	-Ø	mádhu
Ins	-ā	-n-	-nā	mádhu·n·ā
Dat	-e	-n-	-ne	mádhu·n·e
Abl, Gen	-as	-n-	-nas	mádhu·n·as
Loc	-i	-n-	-ni	mádhu·n·i
Case	Std Ending	Treatment	Ending	mádhu-
N.A.V	-ī	-n-	-nī	mádhu·n·ī
I.D.A	-bhyām	–	-bhyām	mádhu·bhyām
Gen, Loc	-os	-n-	-nos	mádhu·n·os
Case	Std Ending	Treatment	Ending	mádhu-
N.A.V	-i	~~-i~~ -ūni	-ūni	mádhū·n·i
Ins	-bhis	–	-bhis	mádhu·bhis
Dat, Abl	-bhyas	–	-bhyas	mádhu·bhyas
Gen	-ām	-ū + -n- ām	-ūnām	mádh·ūnām
Loc	-su	–	-su	mádhu·ṣu

i- and u-stem adjectives are a small class of so-called primary adjectives, such as bahus, -us, -u (Note: many) and śucis, -is, -i , (Note: pure) as well as ones adapted from nouns like bahuvrīhis. They are inflected like the i- and u-stem nouns described above; occasionally the feminine u may gain an additional ī and become vī.

=== ṛ-stems ===
ṛ-stems are predominantly agental derivatives like dātṛ , (Note: giver, donor) though also include kinship terms like pitṛ , (Note: father) mātṛ , (Note: mother) and svasṛ . (Note: sister) The neuter equivalents of derivative agental nouns once again form secondary stems in -n, as in the -i and -u classes.

ṛ-stem masc/fem/neut
Case	Std Ending	Treatment	Ending	dātṛ́-	svásṛ-	pitṛ́-	dhātṛ́- (Note: lit. putter, placer) (Note: In the neuter)
Nom	-s	vṛddhi(ṛ) (~~-rs~~)	-ā	dātā́	svásā́	pitā́	dhātṛ́
Acc	-am	vṛddhi(ṛ) + -am guna(ṛ) + -am (Note: most kinship nouns take the guṇa form, while agental nouns always take the vṛddhi form)	-āram -aram	dāt·ā́r·am	svás·ār·am	pit·ár·am	dhātṛ́
Ins	-ā		-ā	dātr·ā́	svásr·ā	pitr·ā́	dhātṛ́·ṇ·ā
Dat	-e		-e	dātr·é	svásr·e	pitr·é	dhātṛ́·ṇ·e
Abl, Gen	-as	~~-as~~ -ur	-ur	dāt·úr	svás·ur	pit·úr	dhātṛ́·ṇ·as
Loc	-i	guna(ṛ) + -i	-ari	dāt·ár·i	svás·ar·i	pit·ár·i	dhātṛ́·ṇ·i
Voc	-Ø	guna(ṛ)	-ar	dā́t·ar	svás·ar	pít·ar	dhā́tṛ, dhā́tar
Case	Std Ending	Treatment	Ending	dātṛ́-	svásṛ-	pitṛ́-	dhātṛ́
N.A.V	-au	vṛddhi/guna(ṛ) + -au	-ārau / -arau	dāt·ā́r·au	svás·ār·au	pit·ár·au	dhātṛ́·ṇ·ī
I.D.A	-bhyām	–	-bhyām	dātṛ́·bhyām	svásṛ·bhyām	pitṛ́·bhyām	dhātṛ́·bhyām
Gen, Loc	-os	ṛ + -os	-ros	dātr·ós	svásr·os	pitr·ós	dhātṛ́·ṇ·os
Case	Std Ending	Treatment	Ending	dātṛ́-	svásṛ-	pitṛ́-	dhātṛ́
N.V	-as	vṛddhi/guna(ṛ) + -as	-āras / -aras	dāt·ār·as	svás·ār·as	pit·ar·as	dhātṝ́́·ṇ·i
Acc	-as	~~as~~ -ṝn (-ṝṅs) -ṝs	-ṝn (-ṝṅs) -ṝs	dāt·ṝ́n dāt·ṝs	svás·ṝs	pit·ṝ́n	dhātṝ́́·ṇ·i
Ins	-bhis	–	-bhis	dātṛ́·bhis	svásṛ·bhis	pitṛ́·bhis	dhātṛ́·bhis
Dat, Abl	-bhyas	–	-bhyas	dātṛ́·bhyas	svásṛ·bhyas	pitṛ́·bhyas	dhātṛ́·bhyas
Gen	-ām	-ṛ/ṝ + -n- ām	-ṛ/ṝṇām (Note: "nṛ ca" – Pāṇini VI 4.6)	dāt·ṝṇā́m	svás·ṝṇām	pit·ṝṇā́m	dhāt·ṝṇā́m
Loc	-su	–	-su	dātṛ́·ṣu	svásṛ·ṣu	pitṛ́·ṣu	dhātṛ́·ṣu

A single irregular i-stem noun, sakhi , (Note: friend) (Note: cognate with Lat. socius ⇒ 'social, society', etc.) has a stem in -i but declines similarly to the above – simply with y i ī taking the place of r ṛ ṝ:

	Singular	Dual	Plural
Nom	sákh·ā	sákh·āy·au	sákh·āy·as
Acc	sákh·āy·am	sákh·āy·au	sákh·īn
Ins	sákhy·ā	sákhi·bhyām	sákhi·bhis
Dat	sákhy·e	sákhi·bhyām	sákhi·bhy·as
Abl	sákh·ay·ur	sákhi·bhyām	sákhi·bhy·as
Gen	sákh·ay·ur	sákhy·os	sákh·īnām
Loc	sákhy·au, sákh·ay·i	sákhy·os	sákhi·ṣu
Voc	sákh·e	sákh·āy·au	sákh·āy·as

=== ā, ī- and ū-stems ===
This category is made of ā-, ī- and ū-stems, almost entirely feminine, polysyllabic derivative nouns.

==== ā-stems ====
A few forms deviate from the standard in many of which an interspersed -y- can be observed. The vocative also undergoes the usual recessive accent shift.

ā-stem fem
Case	Std Ending	Treatment	Ending	sénā- (Note: army)	kanyā̀- (Note: girl)
Nom	-s	~~-s~~	-ā	sénā	kanyā̀
Acc	-am		-ām	sénā·m	kanyā̀·m
Ins	-ā	~~-ā~~ e + -ā	-ayā	sén·ay·ā	kany·ày·ā
Dat	-e	-ā + y +vṛddhi(e)	-āyai	sénā·yai	kanyā̀·yai
Abl, Gen	-as	-ā + y + vṛddhi(a)s	-āyās	sénā·yās	kanyā̀·yās
Loc	-i	~~-i~~ -ā + yām	-āyām	sénā·yām	kanyā̀·yām
Voc	-Ø	-e	-e	sén·e	kány·e
Case	Std Ending	Treatment	Ending	sénā-	kanyà-
N.A.V	-au	~~-au~~ -e	-e	sé·ne	kany·è
I.D.A	-bhyām		-bhyām	sénā·bhyām	kanyā̀·bhyām
Gen, Loc	-os	e + -os	-ayos	sén·ay·os	kany·ày·os
Case	Std Ending	Treatment	Ending	sénā-	kanyā̀-
Nom, Voc	-as	-ā + as	-ās	sénā·s	kanyā̀·s
Acc	-as	-ā + as	-ās	sénā·s	kanyā̀·s
Ins	-bhis		-bhis	sénā·bhis	kanyā̀·bhis
Dat, Abl	-bhyas		-bhyas	sénā·bhyas	kanyā̀·bhyas
Gen	-ām	-ā + -n- + -ām	-ānām	sénā·nām	kanyā̀·nām
Loc	-su		-su	sénā·su	kanyā̀·su

==== ī- and ū-stems ====
Again most ī- and ū-stem nouns are feminine. ī- and ū-stem adjectives also belong here.

ī- and ū-stems fem
Case	Std Ending	Treatment	Ending	devī́- (Note: goddess)	vadhū́- (Note: bride, wed(ded))
Nom	-s	~~-s~~	(Note: s-dropping ī-stem only)	devī́	vadhū́·s
Acc	-am	~~-a~~	-īm, -ūm	devī́·m	vadhū́·m
Ins	-ā		-ā	devy·ā̀	vadhv·ā̀
Dat	-e	vṛddhi(e)	-ai	devy·aì	vadhv·aì
Abl, Gen	-as	vṛddhi(a)s	-ās	devy·ā̀s	vadhv·ā̀s
Loc	-i	~~-i~~ -ām	-ām	devy·ā̀m	vadhv·ā̀m
Voc	-Ø		(Note: short end vowel)	dévi	vádhu
Case	Std Ending	Treatment	Ending	devī-	vadhū-
N.A.V	-au		-au	devy·aù	vadhv·aù
I.D.A	-bhyām		-bhyām	devī́·bhyām	vadhū́·bhyām
Gen, Loc	-os		-os	devy·òs	vadhv·òs
Case	Std Ending	Treatment	Ending	devī-	vadhū-
Nom, Voc	-as		-as	devy·às	vadhv·às
Acc	-as	~~as~~ -īs, -ūs	-īs, -ūs	devī́·s	vadhū́·s
Ins	-bhis		-bhis	devī́·bhis	vadhū́·bhis
Dat, Abl	-bhyas		-bhyas	devī́·bhyas	vadhū́·bhyas
Gen	-ām	-n- + -ām	-nām	devī́·nām	vadhū́·nām
Loc	-su		-su	devī́·ṣu	vadhū́·ṣu

=== Diphthong stems ===
Stems ending in Sanskrit diphthongs (e, ai, o, au) follow a fairly regular pattern, whilst subject to sandhi rules as usual.

Case	Std Ending	se	raí (Note: wealth) (Note: compare cognates in Slavic *ràjь , Russian рай – 'paradise, heaven', Latin rēs, 'thing')	gó (Note: cow)	naú (Note: ship) (Note: cognate with Latin nāus)
Nom	-s	se·s	rā́·s	gaú·s	naú·s
Acc	-am	say·am	rā́y·am	gā́·m	nā́v·am
Ins	-ā	say·ā	rāy·ā́	gáv·ā	nāv·ā́
Dat	-e	say·e	rāy·é	gáv·e	nāv·é
Abl, Gen	-as	se·s	rāy·ás	gó·s	nāv·ás
Loc	-i	say·i	rāy·í	gáv·i	nāv·í
Voc	-Ø	se	rā́·s	gaú·s	naú·s
Case	Std Ending	se	raí	gó	naú
N.A.V	-au	say·au	rā́y·au	gā́v·au	nā́v·au
I.D.A	-bhyām	se·bhyām	rā·bhyā́m	gó·bhyām	nau·bhyā́m
Gen, Loc	-os	say·os	rāy·ós	gáv·os	nāv·ós
Case	Std Ending	se	raí	gó	naú
Nom, Voc	-as	say·as	rā́y·as	gā́v·as	nā́v·as
Acc	-as	say·as	rā́y·as	gā́·s	nā́v·as
Ins	-bhis	se·bhis	rā·bhís	gó·bhis	nau·bhís
Dat, Abl	-bhyas	se·bhyas	rā·bhyás	gó·bhyas	nau·bhyás
Gen	-ām	say·ām	rāy·ā́m	gáv·ām	nāv·ā́m
Loc	-su	se·ṣu	rā·sú	gó·ṣu	nau·ṣú

=== Bare-consonant and as/us/is-stem nouns ===
Consonant stem nouns may have up to 3 different stems, as well as two special forms:

1. A special lengthened form for the masculine/feminine nominative singular
2. A special lengthened and/or nasalized form for the neuter nom/acc. plural
3. A strong stem (Note: aṅga) used for masc./fem. sing. acc., dual nom./acc. and plur. nom.
4. A medium stem (Note: pada) used with oblique cases with consonant endings, as well as the neuter nom./acc. sing.
5. A weak stem (Note: bha) used everywhere else.

One or more of these stems may be identical for some words, but this is generally not regularly predictable from either the nominative singular or the citation form stem. While the stem ending may undergo expected internal sandhi changes as normal, the endings themselves are gracefully regular.

Consonant stems
Case	Ending	marút m. (Note: wind, wind-god)	trivṛ́t n. (Note: three-fold)	mánas n. (Note: mind)	havís n. (Note: pouring, oblation)
Nom	~~-s~~ various	marút	trivṛ́t	mánas	havís
Acc	-am	marút·am	trivṛ́t	mánas	havís
Ins	-ā	marút·ā	trivṛ́t·ā	mánas·ā	havíṣ·ā
Dat	-e	marút·e	trivṛ́t·e	mánas·e	havíṣ·e
Abl, gen	-as	marút·as	trivṛ́t·as	mánas·as	havíṣ·as
Loc	-i	marút·i	trivṛ́t·i	mánas·i	havíṣ·i
Voc	-Ø	márut	trívṛt	mánas	hávis
Case	Ending	marút	trivṛ́t	mánas	havís
N.A.V	-au, -ī	marút·au	trivṛ́t·au	mánas·ī	havíṣ·ī
I.D.A	-bhyām	marúd·bhyām	trivṛ́d·bhyām	máno·bhyām	havír·bhyām
Gen, loc	-os	marút·os	trivṛ́t·os	mánas·os	havíṣ·os
Case	Ending	marút	trivṛ́t	mánas	havís
Nom, voc	-as, -āni, etc	marút·as	trivṛ́nti	mánāṅsi	havī́ṅṣi
Acc	-as, -āni, etc	marút·as	trivṛ́nti	mánāṅsi	havī́ṅṣi
Ins	-bhis	marúd·bhis	trivṛ́d·bhis	máno·bhis	havír·bhis
Dat, abl	-bhyas	marúd·bhyas	trivṛ́d·bhyas	máno·bhyas	havír·bhyas
Gen	-ām	marút·ām	trivṛ́t·ām	mánas·ām	havíṣ·ām
Loc	-su	marút·su	trivṛ́t·su	mánaḥ·su	havíḥ·su

=== an-stem nouns and in-stem adjectives ===
an-stem nouns and in-stem adjectives (occurring prolifically in masc. and neu.) show very similar behavior and can be grouped together:

Consonant stems
Case	Ending	rā́jan (Note: king)	ātmán (Note: self)	nāman (Note: name)	balín (Note: strong) m.n.	yogín (Note: connected with, possessed of, accompanied by) m.n.
Nom	-s	rā́jā	ātmā́	nā́ma	balī́, balí	yogī́, yogí
Acc	-am	rā́jān·am	ātmā́n·am	nā́ma	balín·am, balí	yogín·am, yogí
Ins	-ā	rā́jñ·ā	ātmán·ā	nā́mn·ā	balín·ā	yogín·ā
Dat	-e	rā́jñ·e	ātmán·e	nā́mn·e	balín·e	yogín·e
Abl, gen	-as	rā́jñ·as	ātmán·as	nā́mn·as	balín·as	yogín·as
Loc	-i	rā́jn·i, rā́jan·i	ātmán·i	nā́mn·i, nā́man·i	balín.i	yogín·i
Voc	-Ø	rā́jan	ā́tman	nā́man, nā́ma	bálin, báli	yógin, yógi
Case	Ending	rā́jan	ātmán	nā́man	balín	yogín
N.A.V	-au	rā́jān·au	ātmán·au	nā́mn·ī, nā́man·ī	balín·au, balín·ī	yogín·au, yogín·ī
I.D.A	-bhyām	rā́ja·bhyām	ātmá·bhyām	nā́ma·bhyām	balí·bhyām	yogí·bhyām
Gen, loc	-os	rā́jṇ·os	ātmán·os	nā́mn·os	balín·os	yogín·os
Case	Std Ending	rā́jan	ātmán	nā́man	balín	yogín
Nom, voc	-as	rā́jān·as	ātmā́n·as	nā́m·āni	balín·as, balín·i	yogín·as, yogín·i
Acc	-as	rā́jñ·as	ātmán·as	nā́m·āni	balín·as	yogín·as
Ins	-bhis	rā́ja·bhis	ātmá·bhis	nā́ma·bhis	balí·bhis	yogí·bhis
Dat, abl	-bhyas	rā́ja·bhyas	ātmá·bhyas	nā́ma·bhyas	balí·bhyas	yogí·bhyas
Gen	-ām	rā́jñ·ām	ātmán·ām	nā́mn·ām	balín·ām	yogín·ām
Loc	-su	rā́ja·su	ātmá·su	nā́ma·su	balí·ṣu	yogí·ṣu

=== ant-, mant- and vant-stem adjectives ===
Participial forms in -ant/-at decline as below, with some stem variation with the -n-. Possessives in -mant and vant- display similar behavior, the difference that stands out is the nom. sing. masc. -mān & -vān. Forms not mentioned fit the existing pattern with full regularity:

Consonant stems singular
Case	Ending	bháv·ant- (Note: being) m.n.	ad·ánt- (Note: eating) m.n.	júhv·at- (Note: pouring, sacrificing) m.n.	paśu·mánt- (Note: cattle-having, 'pecunious') m.n.	bhága·vant- (Note: god, wealthy) (Note: compare Slavic bogъ, bogatъ., 'god', 'wealthy') m.n.
Nom	-s	bháv·an, bháv·at	ad·án, adát	júhv·an, júhv·at	paśu·mā́n, paśu·mát	bhága·vān, bhága·vat
Acc	-am	bháv·ant·am, bháv·at	ad·ánt·am, ad·át	júhv·at·am, júhv·at	paśu·mánt·am, -mát	bhága·vant·am, -vat
Ins	-ā	bháv·at·ā	ad·at·ā́	júhv·at·ā	pasu·mát·ā	bhága·vat·ā
etc					etc	
Voc	-Ø	bháv·an, bháv·at	ád·an, ád·at	júhv·an, júhv·at	páśu·man, -mat	bhág·avan, -vat
Dual
N.A.V	-au, -ī	bháv·ant·au, -ant·ī	ad·ánt·au, ad·at·ī́	júhv·at·au, júhv·at·ī	paśu·mánt·au, -mát·ī	bhága·vant·au, -vat·ī
Plural
N.V	-as, -i	bháv·ant·as, -ant·i	ad·ánt·as, ad·ánt·i	júhv·at·as, júhv·at·i	paśu·mánt·as, -mánti	bhága·vant·as, -vant·i
Acc	-as	bháv·at·as, -ant·i	ad·át·as, ad·ánt·i	júhv·at·as, júhv·at·i	paśu·mát·as, -mánt·i	bhága·vat·as, -vant·i
Ins	-bhis	bháv·ad·bhis	ad·ád·bhis	júhv·ad·bhis	paśu·mád·bhis	bhága·vad·bhis

=== vāṅs-stem perfect participles ===
These forms exhibit similarities with the -vant stems illustrated above, with the main exception that in the weakest forms, before vowel endings, -vāṅs is zero-graded alongside the disappearance of the -ṅ-.

Case	Ending	vidvā́ṅs- (Note: knowing, knowledgeable) m.n.	babhūváṅs- (Note: having been) m.n.
Nom	-s	vid·vā́n, vid·vát	babhū·vā́n, babhū·vát
Acc	-am	vid·vā́ṅs·am, -vát	babhū·vā́ṅs·am, -vát
Ins	-ā	vid·úṣ·ā	babhū·vúṣ·ā
etc		etc	
Voc	-Ø	víd·van, víd·vat	bábhū·van, bábhu·vat
Dual
N.A.V	-au, -ī	vid·vā́ṅs·au, vid·úṣ·ī	babhū·vāṅs·au, babhū·vúṣ·ī
Plural
N.V	-as, -i	vid·vāṅs·as, vid·vā́ṅs·i	babhū·vā́ṅs·as, babhū·vúṣ·i
Acc	-as	vid·úṣ·as, -vā́ṅs·i	babhū·vúṣ·as, -vā́ṅs·i
Ins	-bhis	vid·vád·bhis	babhū·vád·bhis

=== Comparatives and superlatives ===
==== Primary derivation ====
A small closed class of comparatives and superlatives are directly formed on adjectival roots, after dropping the original stem suffix. The comparative takes the suffix -īyān (yāṃsas), yasī, yas, which declines as a consonant- and ī-stem adjective; the superlative takes -iṣṭhas, ā, am. The root is strengthened to the guṇa grade.

- from mahān , (Note: great, mega-) (Note: cognate with Lat. magno-, Gk. mega-) root mah-, is formed mahīyān, mahiṣṭhas;
- from sthiras , (Note: stable) root sthi-, is formed stheyān, stheṣṭhas.

In some adjectives the original form of the root has been obscured by internal sandhi, making the outcome somewhat irregular. Thus:

- from gur-us , (Note: heavy) (Note: cognate with Lat. gravis) originally g(w)ṛ-us, comes garīyān, gariṣṭhas;
- from dīrgh-as , (Note: long) originally dṝgh- < dṛHgh- (where H denotes a laryngeal), a guṇa placed in the second possible slot (Note: 'saṃprasāraṇam') gives draHgh- > drāgh-, whence drāghīyān, drāghiṣṭhas;

==== Secondary derivation ====
The secondary suffixes of comparison are -taras, ā, am for comparative and -tamas, ā, am for superlative. They are appended to the inflectional base, with no modification of the stem. Usually, the pada stem is used for consonant-stem adjectives, but those in a simple -n sometimes retain it.

- priyatara-, priyatama- from priya-;
- vṛṣatara-, vṛṣatama- from vṛṣan-, but vṛṣantama- is also attested.

== Numerals ==
=== Cardinal numbers ===
The numbers from one to ten, along with cognates in closely related languages, are:

Numerals
Sanskrit	Latin	Proto-Indo-European
éka-	ūn-	*Hoi-no-, *Hoi-k(ʷ)o-
dvá-	duo	*d(u)wo-
trí-	trēs, tria	*trei-, *tri-
catúr-	quattuor	*kʷetwor-, *kʷetur-
páñca-	quīnque	*penkʷe
ṣáṣ-	sex	*s(w)eḱs
saptá-, sápta-	septem	*septm̥
aṣṭá-, áṣṭa-	octō	*oḱtō
náva-	novem	*newn̥
dáśa-	decem	*deḱm̥(t)

All numbers in Sanskrit can be declined in all the cases. From one to four, the cardinal numerals agree with the substantive they qualify in number, gender and case; from 5 to 19, in number and case, with only one form for all genders; from 20 onwards in case only.

Éka is declined like a pronominal adjective, though the dual form does not occur. Dvá appears only in the dual. Trí and catúr are declined as below:

	Three			Four		
	Masculine	Neuter	Feminine	Masculine	Neuter	Feminine
Nominative	tráyas	trī́ṇi	tisrás	catvā́ras	catvā́ri	cátasras
Accusative	trīn	trī́ṇi	tisrás	catúras	catvā́ri	cátasras
Instrumental	tribhís		tisṛ́bhis	catúrbhis		catasṛ́bhis
Dative	tribhyás		tisṛ́bhyas	catúrbhyas		catasṛ́bhyas
Ablative	tribhyás		tisṛ́bhyas	catúrbhyas		catasṛ́bhyas
Genitive	trayāṇā́m		tisṛṇā́m	caturṇā́m		catasṛṇā́m
Locative	triṣú		tisṛ́ṣu	catúrṣu		catasṛ́ṣu

The numbers from 11 to 19 are:

ékādaśam, dvā́daśam, tráyodaśam, cáturdaśam, páñcadaśam, ṣóḍaśam, saptádaśam, aṣṭā́daśam, návadaśam.

The tens from 20 to 90 are:

(d)viṃśatí, triṃśát, catvāriṃśát, pañcāśát, ṣaṣṭí, saptatí, aśītí, navatí.

The joint numbers:

21 – ékaviṃśati, 22 – dvā́viṃśati, 23 – trayóviṃśati, ..., 26 – ṣáḍviṃśati, ..., but 82 – dvā́śīti, 83 – trayā́śīti, 88 – aṣṭā́śīti.

The hundreds are:

śatam, dvai śatai, trīṇi śatāni / tri śatam, etc.

The larger numbers:

1000	sahásra
10,000	ayúta
100,000	lakṣá
1,000,000	prayúta
10,000,000	kóṭi
10^{8}	arbudá
10^{9}	mahā́rbuda
10^{10}	kharvá
10^{11}	nikharvá (Note: The series has been carried to great lengths, particularly among the Jains and Buddhists – Burrow)
10^{140}	asaṅkhyeya

=== Compounding numbers ===
All the numerals may be compounded attributively in their stem form:

Compound	Meaning
dvi-pāda-	two-footed
śata-mukha-	hundred-mouthed
daśa-kumāra-carita-	ten-youth-tale, i.e., the story of the ten princes

=== Ordinal numbers ===
The ordinal numbers from one to ten are:

1. prathamás, -ā́
2. dvitī́yas, -ā
3. tṛtī́yas, -ā
4. caturthás, -ī́
5. pañcamás, -ī́
6. ṣaṣṭhás, -ī
7. saptamás, -ī́
8. aṣṭamás, -ī́
9. navamás, -ī́
10. daśamás, -ī́

Other numbers:

11. – ekādaśás, ... 20. – viṃśatitamás (viṃśás), 30. – triṃśattamás (triṃśás), 40. – catvāriṃśattamás, 50. – pañcāśattamás, 60. – ṣaṣtitamás, 70. – saptatitamás, 80. – aśītitamás, 90. – navatitamás, 100. – śatatamás, 1000. – sahasratamás.

== Pronouns and determiners ==
Sanskrit pronouns and determiners behave in their declension largely like other declinable classes such as nouns, adjectives and numerals, so that they can all be classed together under nominals. However, pronouns and determiners display certain peculiarities of their own compared to the other nominal classes.

Furthermore, personal pronouns have an additional dimension not present in the other nominals, but shared by verbs: person.

Pronouns (Note: sarva·nāman) are declined for case (Note: vibhakti), number (Note: vacana), and gender (Note: liṅga). The pronominal declension applies to a few adjectives as well. Many pronouns have alternative enclitic forms.

The official list of Sanskrit pronouns is: sarva, viśva, ubha, ubhaya, utara, utama, anya, anyatara, tvat, tva, nema, sama, sima, pūrva, para, avara, dakṣiṇa, uttara, apara, adhara, sva, antara; tyad, tad, yad, etad, idam, adam; eka, dvi, yuṣmad, asmad, and kim.

=== First- and second-person pronouns ===
Sanskrit pronouns in the first (Note: uttama·puruṣa) and second (Note: madhyama·puruṣa) person are theoretically termed asmad and yuṣmad respectively.

They resemble one another in how they are declined, and similarly do not mark gender. These pronouns have shortened, enclitic forms in the accusative, dative, and genitive cases (parenthesized in the table below).

sing., dual, plu.
Case	asmad	yuṣmad
N.	ahám	tvám
A.	mā́m (mā)	tvā́m (tvā)
I.	máyā	tváyā
D.	máhyam (me)	túbhyam (te)
Ab.	mát	tvát
G.	máma (me)	táva (te)
L.	máy·i	tváy·i
Case	asmad	yuṣmad
N.A.V	āvā́m	yuvā́m
I.D.Ab.	āvā́·bhyām	yuvā́·bhyām
G.L.	āváy·os	yuváy·os
& A.D.G.	(nau)	(vām)
Case	asmad	yuṣmad
N.	vayám	yūyám
A.	asmā́n (nas)	yuṣmā́n (vas)
I.	asmā́·bhis	yuṣmā́·bhis
D.	asmá·bhyam (nas)	yuṣmá·bhyam (vas)
Ab.	asmát	yuṣmát
G.	asmā́kam (nas)	yuṣmā́kam (vas)
L.	asmā́·su	yuṣmā́·su

The forms mad, asmad, tvad and yuṣmad can be used in derivation and composition: mát·kṛta, mát·sakhi, tvát·pitṛ, etc.

=== Demonstratives ===
Sanskrit does not have true third person pronouns, but its demonstratives play this role when they stand independently of a substantive. The four different demonstratives in Sanskrit (Note: cited in their theoretical form) are:

- tad, adas
- idam, etad

Both tad and adas are used for objects of reference that are far away, the latter being more emphatic. Both are translated by the English distal demonstrative that.

By contrast, idam and etad are used for nearby objects, and, again, the latter is more emphatic and has a strong deictic meaning. These two pronouns are translated by the English proximal demonstrative this.

The masculine singular nominative form of tad, sas exhibits irregular sandhi behaviour — before consonants saḥ becomes sa, giving, for instance, sa gajaḥ (Note: that elephant) rather than the expected *so gajaḥ. (Note: This phonological irregularity does not carry over to pronouns analogous to tat such as etat, kim, and yat.)

etad, is declined almost identically to tad. Its paradigm is obtained by prefixing e- to all the forms of tat. Consequently (Note: as a result of a general sandhi rule requiring the retroflexion of s in certain environments,) the masculine and feminine nominative singular forms of this pronoun are eṣas and eṣā.

The declension of idam is somewhat irregular because it is formed from two different stems, i- and a-. (Note: both of these also form proximal pro-adverbs, for example, atra and iha both mean "here", and atas and itas both mean "in this way") The nominative and accusative forms, except the three singular nominatives, are regularly formed with the stem im-, and the remaining forms from a-; an extra -n- is infixed should the ending start with a vowel.

Most of the forms for adas are regularly formed using the stem u- the same way as if it were a-, with the combination *ui- becoming ī- in the plural. The nominative dual and instrumental singular are formed like u-stem nouns.

Singular	tad m.n.	idam m.n	adas m.n	tad f	idam f	adas f
Nominative	sás, tát	ayám, idám	asaú, adás	sā	iyám	asaú
Accusative	tám, tát	imám, idám	amúm, adás	tā́m	imā́m	amū́m
Instrumental	téna	anéna	amúnā	táyā	anáyā	amúyā
Dative	tásmai	asmaí	amúṣmai	tásyai	asyaí	amúṣyai
Ablative	tásmāt	asmā́t	amúṣmāt	tásyās	asyā́s	amúṣyās
Genetive	tásya	asyá	amúṣya	tásyās	asyā́s	amúṣyās
Locative	tásmin	asmín	amúṣmin	tásyām	asyā́m	amúṣyām
Dual	sas, tad	ayam, idam	adas	sā	iyam	amū
N. A.	taú, té	imaú, imé	amū́	té	imé	amū́
I. D. Ab.	tā́bhyām	ābhyā́m	amū́bhyām	tā́bhyām	ābhyā́m	amū́bhyām
G. L.	táyos	anáyos	amúyos	táyos	anáyos	amúyos
Plural	sas, tad	ayam, idam	adas	sā	iyam	amū
N.	te, tā́ni	imé, imā́ni	amī́, amū́ni	tās	imā́s	amū́s
A.	tā́n, tā́ni	imā́n, imā́ni	amū́n, amū́ni	tā́s	imā́s	amū́s
I.	taís	ebhís	amī́bhis	tā́bhis	ābhís	amū́bhis
D. Ab.	tébhyas	ebhyás	amī́bhyas	tā́bhyas	ābhyás	amū́bhyas
G.	téṣām	eṣā́m	amī́ṣām	tā́sām	āsā́m	amū́ṣām
L.	téṣu	eṣú	amī́ṣu	tā́su	āsú	amū́ṣu

=== Possessive pronouns ===
The personal pronouns asmad and yuṣmad allow the following forms of possessive pronouns:

- madīya-, māmaka-, māmakīna- (my, mine)
- asmadīya-, asmāka-, asmākīna- (our/s)
- tvadīya-, tāvaka-, tāvakīna- (thy, thine)
- yuṣmadīya-, yauṣmāka-, yauṣmākīṇa- (your/s)

The feminines are in -ā, and so are tadīya- and etadīya- for tad and etad respectively. But in the -aka forms, it is -akī. These are all conjugated like regular a-, ā and ī-stem forms.

=== Polite pronoun ===
Technically a noun, bhavant (Note: traditionally derived from bhāvant) means 'you' but is treated like a third-person subject. This is declined very much like any vant-stem adjective.

In talking of someone not present, one may use tatrabhavant, and conversely for someone present, atrabhavant, whether being addressed or not.

=== Enclitic pronouns ===
The enclitic pronoun enam is found only in a few oblique cases and numbers. It is unemphatic and mostly refers to persons.

	Singular			Dual			Plural		
	Masc.	Neu.	Fem.	Masc.	Neu.	Fem.	Masc.	Neu.	Fem.
Accusative	enam	enat	enām	enau	ene		enān	enāni	enāḥ
Instrumental	enena								
Genitive/locative				enayos					

=== The k-y-t series of interrogative, relative, and correlative pronouns ===
In Sanskrit, interrogative and relative pronouns are formed analogously to tat. The interrogative pronoun kim is declined like tat, replacing the initial t or s with k. The only exception to this rule is the neuter nominative/accusative singular form, which is kim rather than the expected *kat. The relative pronoun yat is declined like tat, without exception replacing the initial t or s with y.

The demonstrative tat functions as a correlative pronoun when used in "independent clauses that 'complete' relative clauses to form complex sentences"—unlike in English (where one can say, for example, "The girl with whom you were speaking is my sister"), relative pronouns must be accompanied by correlative pronouns (which, if applied to the previous example, would be: "The girl with whom you are speaking, she is my sister").

For a Sanskrit example of a complex sentence using corresponding relative and correlative pronouns, consider: yasmin vane vasati rāmas tasmin vane na vidyante rākṣasāḥ ('In the forest where Rāma lives, there are no demons'). In that example, the pronouns are alike in gender, number, and case, but matching relative–correlative pronouns need not be alike in case—for example: yena puruṣeṇa saha bhāṣate nṛpaḥ sa muniḥ ('The man with whom the king is speaking is a sage').

==== Indefinite and absolute negative phrases ====
Aside from their primary uses, the interrogative and relative pronouns are also used to form indefinite phrases. The two ways of forming indefinite phrases are:

- placing a relative pronoun before its corresponding interrogative pronoun, which in turn is followed by the particle api (for example: yat kim api, which means 'something or another'), and
- placing one of api, cana, or cit after the interrogative pronoun (for example: kiṃcit, which means 'something').

As is evident in the examples, the first method of indicating indefiniteness is stronger, while the latter is more subtle and can simply be translated by an indefinite article in English.

The absolute negative, semantically functioning as the negation of existential quantification, is formed by negating an indefinite phrase.

=== Reflexive pronouns ===
There are a number of words in Sanskrit that function as reflexive pronouns. The indeclinable svayam can indicate reflexivity pertaining to subjects of any person or number, and—since subjects in Sanskrit can appear in the nominative, instrumental, or genitive cases—it can have the sense of any of these cases. The noun ātman ('self') and adjective svaḥ ('own'; cf. Latin suus) decline so as to express reflexivity in any case, person, and number. The former is always in the masculine, even when used in relation to a female subject, but the latter declines for gender.

=== Pronominal adjectives ===
Several adjectives in Sanskrit are declined pronominally. That is, their declension differs from ordinary adjectival declension of a-stems and instead follows the declension of tat in certain respects.

- anya ('other'), anyatara ('either'), itara ('other'), katara ('which of two?'), katama ('which of many?'), and ekatama ('one of many') all follow the tat paradigm exactly.
- sarva ('every', 'all'), ubhaya ('both'), eka ('one'), and ekatara ('either') follow the tat paradigm except in the neuter nominative/accusative singular, ending in -m rather than -t.
- pūrva ('prior', 'east'), avara ('posterior', 'west'), adhara ('inferior', 'west'), uttara ('subsequent', 'north'), dakṣiṇa ('south'), para ('subsequent', 'other', 'opposite'), apara ('other', 'inferior'), antara ('outer'), and sva ('own') follow the tat paradigm except (1) in the neuter nominative/accusative singular, ending in -am rather than -at; (2) in the masculine/neuter ablative and locative singular, sometimes (though not necessarily) ending in -āt and -e rather than -asmāt and -asmin; and (3) in the masculine nominative plural, sometimes (though not necessarily) ending in -āḥ rather than -e.
- ardha ('half'), alpa ('little'), katipaya ('some'), prathama ('first'), carama ('last'), and dvaya/dvitaya ('twofold') generally follow the regular adjective declension for a-stems but sometimes (though not necessarily) follow tat in the masculine nominative plural, ending in -e rather than -āḥ.
- dvitīya ('second') and tṛtīya ('third') optionally follow the declension of tat in the forms of the oblique cases in the singular.

Note that when any of these adjectives are at the end of a compound, they decline exactly like ordinary a-stem adjectives.

== Nominal derivation ==
Derivation or word-formation in Sanskrit can be divided into the following types:

1. Primary derivation – suffixes directly appended to roots (Note: kṛt)
2. Secondary derivation – suffixes appended to derivative stems (Note: taddhita)
3. Word-compounding – combining one more word stems

=== Primary derivatives ===
The root usually undergoes some change of form first, typically to first-grade, or in some cases second-grade, strengthening. A final -n or -m may sometimes be lost, a short vowel may be first followed by a -t, a final palatal or h may revert to the corresponding guttural, and so on.

==== a-suffix derivatives ====
A very large number of derivatives are formed under this category, with several semantic outcomes and with varying treatment of the root, including gradation, reduplication and no change.

1. With guṇa-grading, wherever possible
  - Action nouns
    - √grah- ⇒ gráha- (Note: seize ⇒ seizure)
    - √i- ⇒ áya- (Note: go ⇒ movement)
    - √vid- ⇒ véda- (Note: know ⇒ knowledge)
    - √tṝ- ⇒ tára- (Note: cross ⇒ a crossing)
    - √sṛj- ⇒ sárga- (Note: emit ⇒ emission)
  - Agent nouns
    - √jīv- ⇒ jīvá- (Note: live ⇒ living)
    - √sṛ- ⇒ sará- (Note: flow ⇒ brook)
    - √sṛp- ⇒ sarpá- (Note: creep ⇒ serpent)
    - √kṣam- ⇒ kṣamá- (Note: endure ⇒ patient)
2. With vṛddhi-grading, where the final outcome has an ā
  - Action nouns
    - √kam- ⇒ kā́ma- (Note: wish ⇒ love)
    - √bhaj- ⇒ bhā́ga- (Note: deal/divide ⇒ share)
    - √tṝ- ⇒ tā́ra- (Note: cross ⇒ a crossing) (Note: cf avatāra-)
  - Agent nouns
    - √gṛh- ⇒ grābhá- (Note: take ⇒ a grab)
    - √vah- ⇒ vāhá- (Note: carry ⇒ carrying)
    - √ni- ⇒ nāyá- (Note: lead ⇒ leading)

==== ti-suffix derivatives ====
Another large class, mostly feminine action nouns, with some masculine agent nouns and adjectives. The root remains in zero-grade form, largely like past passive participles in -tá.

- √bhaj- ⇒ bhaktí- (Note: divide ⇒ division)
- √stu- ⇒ stutí- (Note: praise ⇒ a praise)
- √pṝ- ⇒ pūrtí- (Note: fill ⇒ fulfilment)
- √gam- ⇒ gáti- (Note: go ⇒ gait)
- √man- ⇒ matí- (Note: think ⇒ a thought)
- √dṛś- ⇒ dṛ́ṣṭi- (Note: see ⇒ sight)
- √vac- ⇒ úkti- (Note: speak ⇒ speech/utterance)
- √vṛdh- ⇒ vṛ́ddhi- (Note: grow ⇒ growth)

==== man-suffix derivatives ====
This is another productive category (PIE *-men), mostly of action-noun formations.

- √kṛ- ⇒ kárman- (Note: do ⇒ deed)
- √dhṛ- ⇒ dhárman- (Note: hold ⇒ rule)
- √vṛt- ⇒ vártman- (Note: turn ⇒ track) (Note: cf Russian времен- vremen-)
- nā́man- (Note: name) (Note: cf Latin nōmen)
- bráhman- (Note: worship)
- brahmán- (Note: worshiper)
- áśman- (Note: stone) (Note: cf Russian ка́мень kaḿen)

==== tar-suffix derivatives ====
tṛ- or tar-suffix derivatives, mostly agent nouns (PIE *-tor, English -er).

- √kṛ- ⇒ kártṛ (Note: do ⇒ doer)
- √dā- ⇒ dātṛ (Note: give ⇒ giver) (Note: cf Lat. dator)
- √gam- ⇒ gantṛ (Note: go ⇒ goer)
- √hu- ⇒ hotṛ (Note: offer ⇒ sacrificer)

Several basic kinship nouns are classed under here.

- √pā- ⇒ pitṛ́ (Note: protect ⇒ father)
- mātṛ́ (Note: mother)
- bhrā́tṛ (Note: brother)
- √duh- ⇒ duhitṛ́ (Note: milk, suckle ⇒ daughter)

==== tra-suffix derivatives ====
Typically nouns expressing the means of doing something.

- √pā- ⇒ pā́tra- (Note: drink ⇒ cup)
- √man- ⇒ mántra- (Note: think ⇒ thought)
- √vas- ⇒ vástra- (Note: clothe ⇒ clothing)
- √rāj- ⇒ rāṣṭrá- (Note: rule ⇒ reign, kingdom)

=== Secondary derivatives ===
This is used primarily to form words of adjectival meaning, and with the first vowel usually undergoing vṛddhi-grade strengthening.

==== a-suffix derivatives ====
A commonly used class, nouns or adjectives that denote a relationship. Patronymics are also derived in this manner.

- mánas- ⇒ mānasá- (Note: mind ⇒ mental)
- bráhman- ⇒ brāhmaṇá- (Note: worship ⇒ priest)
- Marút- ⇒ mā́ruta- (Note: Maruts, wind-gods ⇒ of the wind-gods)
- Mánus- ⇒ mā́nuṣa- (Note: Manu(s), man ⇒ descendant of Manu)

==== ya-suffix derivatives ====
Another commonly used class. Closely related are -iya- and -īya- formations.

- devá- ⇒ daívya- (Note: a god ⇒ divine)
- loká- ⇒ laúkya- (Note: world ⇒ worldly)
- púṃs- ⇒ paúṃsya- (Note: male ⇒ manly)
- gó- ⇒ gávya- (Note: cow ⇒ bovine)
- sánt- ⇒ satyá- (Note: is, essence ⇒ truth)

-iya- is used after a consonant cluster:

- kṣatrá- ⇒ kṣatríya- (Note: might ⇒ mighty)
- yajñá- ⇒ yajñíya- (Note: offering, worship ⇒ reverend)
- índra- ⇒ indriyá- (Note: Indra ⇒ Indran)
- kṣétra- ⇒ kṣetriyá- (Note: field ⇒ of the field)

==== tā and tva-suffix derivatives ====
These suffixes denote the quality of being, analogous to '-ness' and '-hood' in English. Cf Lat -tas (-ty), Slavic *-ьstvo. Coupled with the prefix a- 'un-', the sense of '-lessness' is derived.

- devá·tā (Note: deity, divinity)
- nagná·tā (Note: nudity)
- a·gó·tā (Note: poverty in cattle, lit. cowlessness)
- a·paśú·tā (Note: cattlelessness) (Note: lit. and cognate with im·pecu·nity)
- a·mṛta·tvá (Note: immortality)
- bhrātṛ·tvá (Note: brotherhood, fraternity)
- śatru·tvá (Note: enmity)

=== Compounds ===
In traditional Sanskrit grammar, compounds (Note: samāsa·vṛtti) are divided into the following main classes:

- Tatpuruṣa
  - Karmadhāraya
    - Dvigu
  - Upapada
- Bahuvrīhi
  - Dvigu
- Dvandva
- Avyayībhāva

== See also ==
- Sanskrit verbs
- Sanskrit grammar
- Vedic Sanskrit grammar
- Proto-Indo-Aryan
- Proto-Indo-Iranian
- Proto-Indo-European

== Bibliography ==
- Fortson, Benjamin W (2010). Indo-European Language and Culture (2010 ed.). Wiley-Blackwell. ISBN 978-1-4051-8895-1.
- Burrow, Thomas (2001). The Sanskrit Language (2001 ed.). Motilal Banarsidass. ISBN 81-208-1767-2.
- Whitney, William Dwight (January 2008). Sanskrit Grammar (2000 ed.). Motilal Banarsidass. ISBN 978-81-208-0620-7.
- W. D. Whitney, The Roots, Verb-Forms and Primary Derivatives of the Sanskrit Language (A Supplement to His Sanskrit Grammar)
- Coulson, Michael. Teach Yourself Sanskrit. Oxford: Hodder and Stoughton, 1986. (ISBN 0-340-32389-2)
- Coulson, Michael (2003). Sanskrit (2003 ed.). McGraw Hill. ISBN 0-340-85990-3.
- Bucknell, Roderick S (January 2010). Sanskrit Grammar (2000 ed.). Motilal Banarsidass. ISBN 978-81-208-1188-1.
- Kale, M R (1969). A Higher Sanskrit Grammar (2002 ed.). Motilal Banarsidass. ISBN 81-208-0177-6.
- Macdonell, A. A. A Sanskrit Grammar for Students. London: Oxford UP, 1927. (ISBN 81-246-0094-5)
- Delbrück, B. Altindische Tempuslehre (1876)
- Goldman, Robert P. & Sally J. Devavāṇīpraveśikā. Berkeley: Center for South Asian Studies, 2004. (ISBN 0-944613-40-3)
- Wackernagel, Debrunner, Altindische Grammatik, Göttingen.
  - vol. I. phonology Jacob Wackernagel (1896)
  - vol. II.1. introduction to morphology, nominal composition, Wackernagel (1905)
  - vol. II.2. nominal suffixes, J. Wackernagel and Albert Debrunner (1954)
  - vol. III. nominal inflection, numerals, pronouns, Wackernagel and Debrunner (1930)
