= Exponent (linguistics) =

Phonological manifestation of a morphosyntactic property

An exponent is a phonological manifestation of a morphosyntactic property. In non-technical language, it is the expression of one or more grammatical properties by sound. There are several kinds of exponents:

- Identity
- Affixation
- Reduplication
- Internal modification
- Subtraction

== Identity ==
The identity exponent is both simple and common: it has no phonological manifestation at all.

An example in English:

DEER + PLURAL → deer

== Affixation ==
Affixation is the addition of an affix (such as a prefix, suffix or infix) to a word.

Example in English:

want + PAST → wanted

== Reduplication ==
Reduplication is the repetition of part of a word.

An example in Sanskrit:

दा dā ("give") + PRESENT + ACTIVE + INDICATIVE + FIRST PERSON + SINGULAR → ददामि dadāmi (the da at the beginning is from reduplication of dā that involves a vowel change, a characteristic of class 3 verbs in Sanskrit)

== Internal modification ==
There are several types of internal modification. An internal modification may be segmental, meaning it changes a sound in the root.

An example in English:

STINK + PAST = stank (i becomes a)

An internal modification might be a suprasegmental modification. An example would be a change in pitch or stress.

An example of the latter in English (acute accent indicates stress):

RECÓRD + NOUN = récord

== Subtraction ==
Subtraction is the removal of a sound or a group of sounds.

An example in French:

OEUF /œf/ ("egg") + PLURAL = œufs /ø/ (final f is lost)
