= Vedic Sanskrit =

Historic form of Sanskrit

- Native to: South Asia
- Region: Northwestern Indian subcontinent
- Era: c. 1500 – 600 BCE
- Language family: Indo-European: Indo-Iranian; Indo-Aryan; Vedic Sanskrit
- Early forms: Proto-Indo-European: Proto-Indo-Iranian; Proto-Indo-Aryan

Language codes
- ISO 639-3: vsn
- Glottolog: vedi1234

Vedic Sanskrit, also simply referred as the Vedic language, is the earliest attested form of the Sanskrit and Prakrit languages: members of the Indo-Aryan subgroup of the Indo-European language family. It is attested in the Vedas and related literature compiled over the period of the mid-2nd to mid-1st millennium BCE. It is orally preserved, predating the local advent of writing by several centuries.

Extensive ancient literature in the Vedic Sanskrit language has survived into the modern era, and this has been a major source of information for reconstructing Proto-Indo-European and Proto-Indo-Iranian history.

== History ==
=== Prehistoric derivation ===
The separation of the Proto-Indo-Iranian language into Proto-Iranian and Proto-Indo-Aryan is estimated, on linguistic grounds, to have occurred around or before 1800 BCE. The date of composition of the oldest hymns of the Rigveda is vague at best, generally estimated to roughly 1500 BCE. Both Asko Parpola (1988) and J. P. Mallory (1998) place the locus of the division of Indo-Aryan from Iranian in the Bronze Age culture of the Bactria–Margiana Archaeological Complex (BMAC). Parpola (1999) elaborates the model and has "Proto-Rigvedic" Indo-Aryans intrude the BMAC around 1700 BCE. He assumes early Indo-Aryan presence in the Late Harappan horizon from about 1900 BCE, and "Proto-Rigvedic" (Proto-Dardic) intrusion to Punjab as corresponding to the Gandhara grave culture from about 1700 BCE. According to this model, Rigvedic within the larger Indo-Aryan group is the direct ancestor of the Dardic languages.

The early Vedic Sanskrit language was far less homogeneous compared to the language described by Pāṇini, that is, Classical Sanskrit. The language in the early Upanishads of Hinduism and the late Vedic literature approaches Classical Sanskrit. The formalization of the late form of Vedic Sanskrit language into the Classical Sanskrit form is credited to Pāṇini's Aṣṭādhyāyī, along with Patanjali's Mahabhasya and Katyayana's commentary that preceded Patanjali's work. The earliest epigraphic records of the indigenous rulers of India are written in the Prakrit language. Originally the epigraphic language of the whole of India was mainly Prakrit and Sanskrit is first noticed in the inscriptions of North India from about the second half of the 1st century BCE. Sanskrit gradually ousted Prakrit from the field of Indian epigraphy in all parts of the country.

=== Chronology ===
Five chronologically distinct strata can be identified within the Vedic language:

1. Ṛg-vedic
2. Mantra
3. Saṃhitā prose
4. Brāhmaṇa prose
5. Sūtras

The first three are commonly grouped together, as the Saṃhitās (Note: 'compiled', 'put together') comprising the four Vedas: (Note: from vid-, 'to know', cognate with Eng. 'wit') ṛg, atharvan, yajus, sāman, which together constitute the oldest texts in Sanskrit and the canonical foundation both of the Vedic religion, and the later religion known as Hinduism.

==== Ṛg-vedic ====
Many words in the Vedic Sanskrit of the Ṛg·veda have cognates or direct correspondences with the ancient Avestan language, but these do not appear in post-Rigvedic Indian texts. The text of the Ṛg·veda must have been essentially complete by around the 12th century BCE. The pre-1200 BCE layers mark a gradual change in Vedic Sanskrit, but there is disappearance of these archaic correspondences and linguistics in the post-Rigvedic period.

==== Mantra language ====
This period includes both the mantra and prose language of the Atharvaveda (Paippalada and Shaunakiya), the Ṛg·veda Khilani, the Samaveda Saṃhitā, and the mantras of the Yajurveda. These texts are largely derived from the Ṛg·veda, but have undergone certain changes, both by linguistic change and by reinterpretation. For example, the more ancient injunctive verb system is no longer in use.

==== Saṃhitā ====
An important linguistic change is the disappearance of the injunctive, subjunctive, optative, imperative (the aorist). New innovations in Vedic Sanskrit appear such as the development of periphrastic aorist forms. This must have occurred before the time of Pāṇini because Panini makes a list of those from the northwestern region of India who knew these older rules of Vedic Sanskrit.

==== Brāhmaṇa prose ====
In this layer of Vedic literature, the archaic Vedic Sanskrit verb system has been abandoned, and a prototype of pre-Panini Vedic Sanskrit structure emerges. The Yajñagāthās texts provide a probable link between Vedic Sanskrit, Classical Sanskrit and languages of the Epics. Complex meters such as Anuṣṭubh and rules of Sanskrit prosody had been or were being innovated by this time, but parts of the Brāhmaṇa layers show the language is still close to Vedic Sanskrit.

==== Sūtra language ====
This is the last stratum of Vedic literature, comprising the bulk of the Śrautasūtras and Gṛhyasūtras and some Upaniṣads such as the Kaṭha Upaniṣad and Maitrāyaṇiya Upaniṣad. These texts elucidate the state of the language which formed the basis of Pāṇini's codification into Classical Sanskrit.

== Phonology ==
Vedic differs from Classical Sanskrit to an extent comparable to the difference between Homeric Greek and Classical Greek.

The following differences between Vedic and Classical Sanskrit may be observed in the phonology:

- Vedic had a voiced retroflex lateral approximant [ɭ] as well as its breathy-voiced counterpart [ɭʱ], which are intervocal allophones of ḍ (/ɖ/) and ḍh (/ɖʱ/).
- The vowels e and o were realized in Vedic as diphthongs ai and au, but they became monophthongs in later Sanskrit, such as daivá- > devá-and áika->ekā-. However, the diphthongal quality still resurfaces in sandhi.
- The vowels ai and au were realized in Vedic as long diphthongs āi and āu, respectively, but they became correspondingly short in Classical Sanskrit: dyā́us > dyáus.
- The Prātiśākhyas claim that the "dental" consonants were articulated from the teeth ridge (dantamūlīya, alveolar), but they became dentals later, whereas most other authorities including Pāṇini designate them as dentals.
- The Prātiśākhyas are inconsistent about [r] but generally claim that it was also a dantamūlīya. According to Pāṇini it is a retroflex consonant.
- The pluti (trimoraic) vowels were on the verge of becoming phonemicized during middle Vedic, but disappeared again.
- Vedic often allowed two like vowels in certain cases to come together in hiatus without merger during sandhi, which has been reconstructed as the influence of an old laryngeal still present in the Proto-Indo-Iranian stage of the language: PIE *h₂weh₁·nt- → va·ata-. (Note: vā́ta-, wind)

=== Accent ===
Early Vedic had a tonal system inherited from the Proto-Indo-European accent, which only distinguishes tone height. However, the contraction of two syllables, the first of which carries an udātta (high pitch) and the second a so-called "dependent svarita" (high falling pitch), gave rise to a small number of words with the "independent svarita" on a short vowel in a late pronunciation of Vedic. The origin of the independent svarita can be inferred from metrically restored versions of the Rig Veda.

This tonal system persisted for some time after the Vedic period. Early Sanskrit grammarian Pāṇini marked the position of the accent, (Note: Today, the pitch accent can be heard only in the traditional Vedic chantings.) giving accent rules for both the spoken language of his time as well as the differences of Vedic accent. However, no extant post-Vedic text with accents are found.

=== Pluti ===
Pluta
ā3 (आ३)
ī3 (ई३)
ū3 (ऊ३)
ai3 (ए३)
āi4 (ऐ४)
ā3i (आ३इ)
au3 (ओ३)
āu4 (औ४)
ā3u (आ३उ)
ṝ3 (ॠ३)
ḹ3 (ॡ३)

Pluti, or prolation, is the term for the phenomenon of protracted or overlong vowels in Sanskrit; the overlong or prolated vowels are themselves called pluta. Pluta vowels are usually noted with a numeral "3" (३) indicating a length of three morae (trimātra).

A diphthong is prolated by prolongation of its first vowel. Pāṇinian grammarians recognise the phonetic occurrence of diphthongs measuring more than three morae in duration, but classify them all as prolated (i.e. trimoraic) to preserve a strict tripartite division of vocalic length between hrasva (short, 1 mora), dīrgha (long, 2 morae) and pluta (prolated, 3+ morae).

The syllable Aum (ओ३म्) rendered with pluta

Pluta vowels are recorded a total of 3 times in the Rigveda and 15 times in the Atharvaveda, typically in cases of questioning and particularly where two options are being compared. For example:

- adháḥ svid āsî3d upári svid āsī3t

"Was it above? Was it below?"
Rigveda 10.129.5d

- idáṃ bhûyā3 idâ3miti

"Is this larger? Or this?"
Atharvaveda 9.6.18

The pluti attained the peak of their popularity in the Brahmana period of late Vedic Sanskrit (roughly 8th century BC), with some 40 instances in the Shatapatha Brahmana alone.

== See also ==
- Classical Sanskrit
- Sanskrit epigraphy
- Vedic Sanskrit grammar
- Vedic metre
- Vedic period
- A Vedic Word Concordance
- Avestan, a closely related language
- Rudrakshajabala Upanishad

== Brahmic notes ==
Brahmic transliteration

== Bibliography ==
- Burrow, T. (2001). The Sanskrit language (1st Indian ed.). Delhi: Motilal Banarsidass. ISBN 9788120817678.
- Clackson, James (2007). Indo-European Linguistics. Cambridge. ISBN 978-0-521-65313-8.
- Kobayashi, Masato (2006). "Pāṇini's Phonological Rules and Vedic: Aṣṭādhyāyī 8.2*" (PDF). Journal of Indological Studies. 18.
- Macdonell, Arthur Anthony (1916). A Vedic Grammar for Students. Motilal Banarsidass. ISBN 978-81-208-1052-5.
- Michael Witzel (1989), Colette Caillat (ed.), Tracing the Vedic dialects, in Dialectes dans les litteratures Indo-Aryennes (PDF) (in French), Paris: de Boccard
- Reich, David (2019). Who we are and how we got here: ancient DNA and the new science of the human past. New York: First Vintage Books. ISBN 978-1-101-87346-5.
- Scharf, Peter M.; Hymann, Malcolm D. (2011). Linguistic Issues in Encoding Sanskrit (PDF) (1st ed.). Providence: The Sanskrit Library. ISBN 9788120835399.
- Whitney, William Dwight (1950). Sanskrit Grammar: Including both the Classical Language, and the older Dialects, of Veda and Brahmana. Cambridge, Massachusetts: Harvard University Press.
