= Injunctive mood =

Grammatical mood in Sanskrit

The injunctive mood was a grammatical mood in Sanskrit that was characterized by secondary endings but no augment, and usually looked like an augmentless aorist or imperfect. It typically stood in a main clause and had a subjunctive or imperative meaning; for example, it could indicate intention, e.g. RV 1.32.1 índrasya nú vīryā̀ṇi prá vocam "Indra's heroic deeds will/shall I now declaim". It was obligatory for use in prohibitions, where it follows mā́. By later Classical Sanskrit, this was the only use which remained in use.

Ancient Greek has words that are formally similar to the Sanskrit injunctive mood, consisting of aorist and imperfect forms lacking the augment. These are normally used in Homer and other epic poetry (see Homeric Greek).

It is generally assumed that the augment was originally a separate particle meaning something like "then", added to indicate the past time of a form that was once mostly aspectual, and neutral with respect to tense. Originally, its use appears to have been optional, added as necessary to clear up an otherwise ambiguous expression, similarly to time adverbs in Chinese. Gradually, it fused onto the verb form and became mandatory, but in the early stages of Greek and Sanskrit this change was not yet complete, and hence augmentless forms existed side-by-side with augmented forms. The modal semantics of the augmentless forms may then be a later development within Indo-Iranian or Indo-Aryan. It's also possible that the modal semantics developed in the parent language and later developments in Pre-Greek removed them and put back the basic meaning of the aorist and imperative, by analogy.
