= Proto-Indo-Aryan language =

Protolanguage of the Indo-Aryan language family

Proto-Indo-Aryan
- PIA, Proto-Indic
- Reconstruction of: Indo-Aryan languages
- Reconstructed ancestors: Proto-Indo-European: Proto-Indo-Iranian

Proto-Indo-Aryan (sometimes Proto-Indic (Note: In modern and colloquial context, the term "Indic" refers more generally to the languages of the Indian subcontinent, thus also including non-Aryan language families like Dravidian and Munda. See e.g. Reynolds, Mike; Verma, Mahendra (2007). "Indic languages". In Britain, David (ed.). Language in the British Isles. Cambridge: Cambridge University Press. pp. 293–307. ISBN 978-0-521-79488-6.)) is the reconstructed proto-language of the Indo-Aryan languages. It is intended to reconstruct the language of the Indo-Aryans, who had migrated into the Indian subcontinent. Being descended from Proto-Indo-Iranian (which in turn is descended from Proto-Indo-European), it has the characteristics of a satem language.

== History ==
Proto-Indo-Aryan is meant to be the predecessor of Old Indo-Aryan (1500–300 BCE), which is directly attested as Vedic and Classical Sanskrit, as well as by the Indo-Aryan superstrate in Mitanni. Indeed, Vedic Sanskrit is very close to Proto-Indo-Aryan.

This language is usually associated with the Fedorovo Culture, in the Andronovo Horizon.

Some of the Prakrits display a few minor features derived from Proto-Indo-Aryan that had already disappeared in Vedic Sanskrit.

Today, numerous modern Indo-Aryan languages are extant.

== Differences from Vedic ==
Despite the great archaicity of Vedic, the other Indo-Aryan languages preserve a small number of conservative features lost in Vedic.

One of these is the representation of Proto-Indo-European *l and *r. Vedic (as also most Iranic languages) merges both as /r/. Later, however, some instances of Indo-European /l/ again surface in Classical Sanskrit, indicating that the contrast survived in an early Indo-Aryan dialect parallel to Vedic. (A dialect with only /l/ is additionally posited to underlie Magadhi Prakrit.) However, it is not clear that the contrast actually survived anywhere in Indo-Iranian, not even in Proto-Indo-Iranian, as /l/ is also found in place of original *r in Indo-Iranian languages.

The common consonant cluster kṣ /kʂ/ of Vedic and later Sanskrit has a particularly wide range of Proto-Indo-European (PIE) and Proto-Indo-Iranian (PII) sources, which partly remain distinct in later Indo-Aryan languages:

- PIE *ks, *kʷs, *gs, *gʷs > PII *kš > Middle Indo-Aryan kh-, -kkh-
- PIE *dʰgʷʰ, *gʰs, *gʷʰs > PII *gʱžʱ > Middle Indo-Aryan gh-, -ggh-
- PIE *tḱ; *ǵs, *ḱs > PII *tć, *ćš > Middle Indo-Aryan ch-, -cch-
- PIE *dʰǵʰ, *ǵʰs > PII *ȷ́ʱžʱ > Middle Indo-Aryan jh-, -jh-

=== Personal pronouns (nominative case) ===
Most personal pronouns are identical between Proto-Indo-Iranian and Proto-Indo-Aryan and show modest differences between Proto-Indo-Aryan and Sanskrit

Pronoun	PIE	PII and PIA
I	*éǵ > *eǵHóm	*aȷ́Hám > *aȷ́ʰám > PIA *aźʰám > Skr अहम् (ahám)
You	*túh₂	*túH > PIA *tuHám > Skr त्वम् (tvám)
He	*ey- (*eyóm?) *só	*sá
She	*séh₂	*sáH > Skr सा (sā́)
It	*tód	*tád > Skr तद् (tad)
We	*wéy > *weyóm	*wayám
You (all)	*yū́	*yúH > Skr यूयम् (yūyám)
They (m.)	*tóy	*táy > Skr ते (te) /tai/
They (f.)	*téh₂es	*tā́s (or *táHas?) > Skr ताः (tāḥ)
They (n.)	*téh₂	*tá > Skr तानि (tāni)

=== Numerals ===
Most numerals are identical between Proto-Indo-Iranian and Proto-Indo-Aryan. Most number show minimal differences between Proto-Indo-Aryan and Sanskrit (e.g., the loss of the fricative sound *H).

Numeral	PIE	PII and PIA
One (1)	*h₁óynos > *h₁óykos	*Háykas > Skr एक (éka) /aika/
Two (2)	*dwóh₁	*dwáH > Skr द्व (dvá)
Three (3)	*tréyes	*tráyas > Skr त्रयः (tráyaḥ) [nom. plur.]
Four (4)	*kʷetwóres	*čatwā́ras > Skr चत्वारः (catvā́raḥ) [nom.]
Five (5)	*pénkʷe	*pánča
Six (6)	*swéḱs	*šwáćš > PIA *ṣwáṭṣ > Skr षट् (ṣáṭ)
Seven (7)	*septḿ̥	*saptá
Eight (8)	*oḱtṓw	*Haštā́ > PIA *Haṣṭā́ > Skr अष्ट (aṣṭá)
Nine (9)	*h₁néwn̥	*Hnáwa > Skr नव (náva)
Ten (10)	*déḱm̥	*dáća > PIA *dáśa
