= Boden Professor of Sanskrit =

Professorship at the University of Oxford

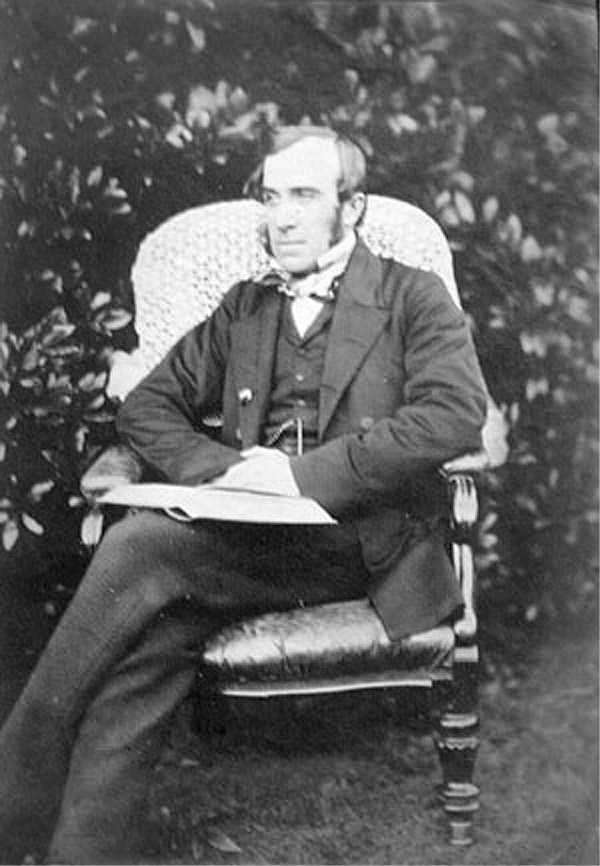
Monier Williams, the second Boden Professor of Sanskrit, photographed by Lewis Carroll

The position of Boden Professor of Sanskrit at the University of Oxford was established in 1832 with money bequeathed to the university by Lieutenant Colonel Joseph Boden, a retired soldier in the service of the East India Company. He wished the university to establish a Sanskrit professorship to assist in the conversion of the people of British India to Christianity, and his bequest was also used to fund scholarships in Sanskrit at Oxford. The first two professors were elected by Oxford graduates, as the university's statutes provided: Horace Hayman Wilson won by a narrow majority in 1832, and the 1860 election was hotly contested, as the rivals each claimed to be best at fulfilling Boden's intentions and presented different views about the nature and purpose of Sanskrit scholarship. Reforms of Oxford implemented in 1882 removed all mention of Boden's original purpose from the statutes, removed the power to elect the professor from graduates, and gave the holder of the professorship a fellowship at Balliol College, Oxford.

Four of the first five professors were born in British India or had worked there. To date, Sir Monier Monier-Williams (professor 1860–99) has held the chair the longest, although a deputy was appointed to carry out his teaching duties for the last 11 years of his life. The current holder (as of 2023), James Mallinson, was appointed in 2023 and is the ninth Boden professor. Richard Gombrich (professor 1976–2004) has said that he had to fight to ensure that he was replaced on retirement; his view was that Oxford retained the chair in Sanskrit because it was the last such position in the United Kingdom.

== Foundation ==
Extract from Joseph Boden's will, 15 August 1811

"I do hereby give and bequeath all and singular my said residuary estate and effects, with the accumulations thereof, if any, and the stocks, funds, and securities whereon the same shall have been laid out and invested, unto the University of Oxford, to be by that body appropriated in and towards the erection and endowment of a Professorship in the Shanskreet language, at or in any or either of the Colleges in the said University, being of opinion that a more general and critical knowledge of that language will be a means of enabling my countrymen to proceed in the conversion of the natives of India to the Christian Religion, by disseminating a knowledge of the Sacred Scriptures amongst them, more effectually than all other means whatsoever."

Lieutenant Colonel Joseph Boden, after whom the professorship in Sanskrit at the University of Oxford is named, served in the Bombay Native Infantry of the East India Company from 1781 until his retirement in 1807. He moved to Lisbon, Portugal, for the sake of his health, and died there on 21 November 1811. His daughter Elizabeth died in August 1827, and Boden's will provided that his estate should then pass to the University of Oxford to establish a professorship in Sanskrit. His purpose, as set out in his will dated 15 August 1811, was to convert the people of India (Note: At this time, "India" described the area covered by present-day India, Pakistan, Burma, Sri Lanka and Bangladesh.) to Christianity "by disseminating a knowledge of the Sacred scriptures among them". Elizabeth was buried in a vault at Holy Trinity Church, Cheltenham, where a memorial stone sets out an extract from Boden's will about the bequest, and records that Boden's estate was worth about £25,000 in 1827. (Note: In 2013 terms (the last year for which updating figures are available as of January 2015), £25,000 in 1827 would be equivalent to about £1.9M updated for inflation using the Retail Price Index or about £82M updated to represent an equivalent share of gross domestic product.) The university accepted Boden's bequest in November 1827, and the first professor was elected in 1832. His bequest is also used to fund the Boden Scholarship, awarded "for the encouragement of the study of, and proficiency in, the Sanskrit Language and Literature".

== Elections ==
=== Election of 1832 ===
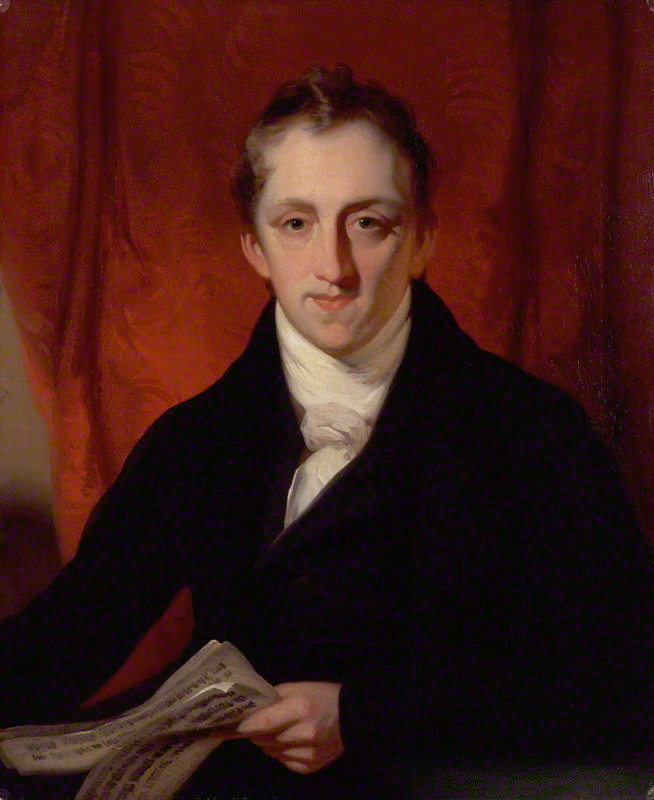
Horace Hayman Wilson (1786-1860), first Boden Professor of Sanskrit at Oxford University

The first and second Boden professors were chosen by Convocation (which at that time was the main governing body of the university, comprising all who had graduated with a master's degree or a doctorate). In 1832, the voters had a choice of two candidates: Horace Hayman Wilson and William Hodge Mill. Wilson, a surgeon by training, worked in India for the East India Company and was involved in various scholarly and educational activities. Mill had been principal of Bishop’s College, Calcutta, since 1820. Despite his abilities as a scholar, Wilson was seen by some in the university as too close to Hindu leaders to be appointed to a post which had the purpose of helping to convert India to Christianity, and his links to the theatrical world in Calcutta were considered to be disreputable. Nevertheless, he defeated Mill by 207 votes to 200 when the election was held on 15 March 1832. Another candidate, Graves Haughton (a professor at the East India Company College), had earlier withdrawn from the election in favour of Wilson (one of his former pupils) as they had many friends in common and he did not want to split their loyalties. For his "candid and honourable conduct" throughout the election he received a written address of appreciation signed by two hundred members of the university, including professors and the heads of seven of the colleges.

=== Election of 1860 ===
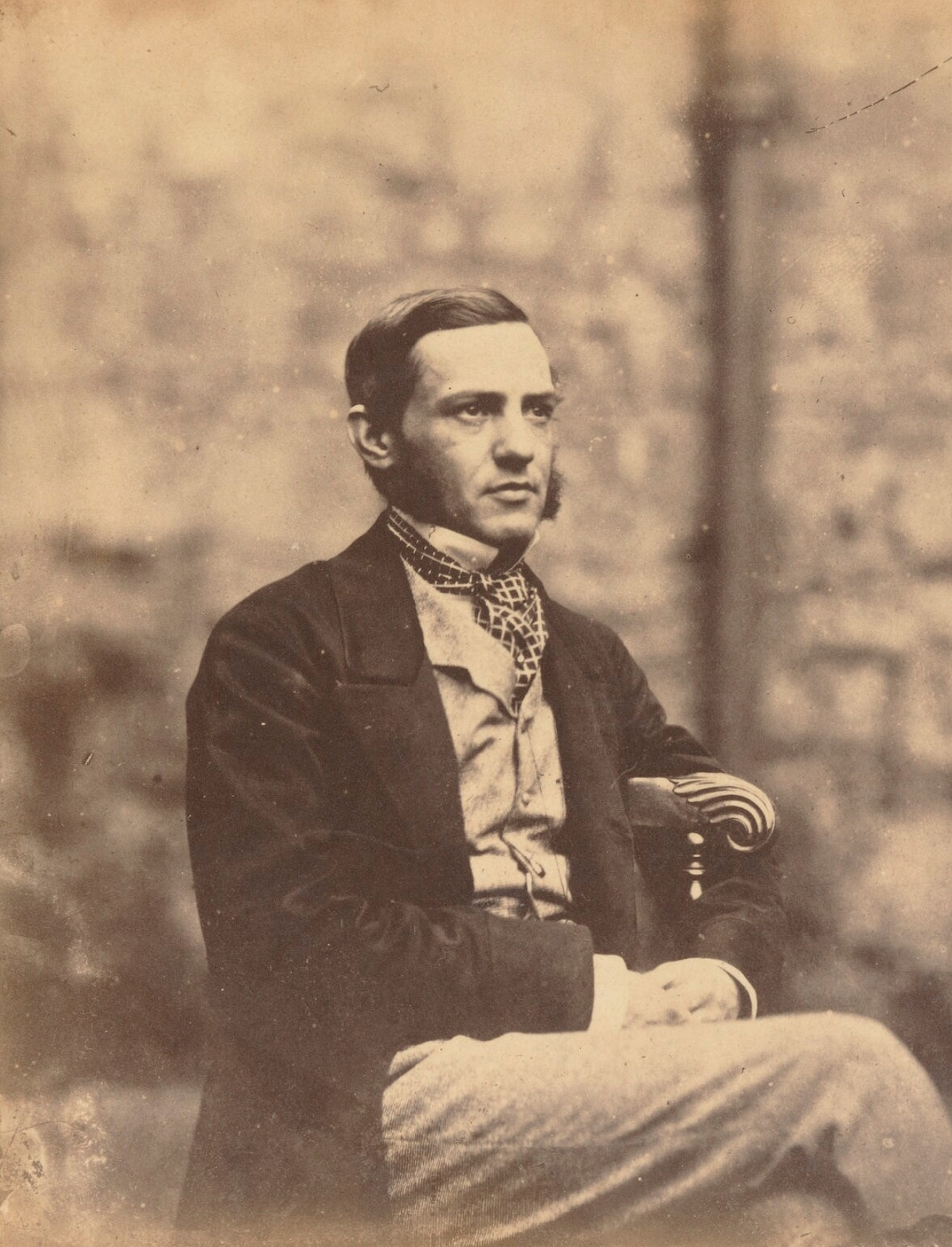
Friedrich Max Müller (1823-1900), photographed by Lewis Carroll

After Wilson's death in 1860, there was a contest between Monier Williams and Max Müller to succeed him. Williams was an Oxford-educated Englishman who had spent 14 years teaching Sanskrit to those preparing to work in British India for the East India Company. Müller was a German-born lecturer at Oxford specialising in comparative philology, the science of language. Williams laid great stress in his campaign on Boden's intention that the holder should assist in converting India through dissemination of the Christian scriptures. Müller's view was that his work was of great value to missionaries, and published testimonials accordingly, but was also a worthy end in itself. The rival campaigns took out newspaper advertisements and circulated manifestos, and different newspapers backed each man. The election came at a time of public debate about Britain's role in India particularly after the Indian Rebellion of 1857–58, in particular whether greater efforts should be made to convert India or whether to remain sensitive to local culture and traditions. Although generally regarded as superior to Williams in scholarship, Müller had the double disadvantage (in the eyes of some) of being German and having liberal Christian views. Some of the newspaper pronouncements in favour of Williams were based on a claimed national interest of having an Englishman as Boden professor to assist with the work of governing and converting India. As the religious historian Gwilym Beckerlegge has stated, "voting for the Boden Chair was increasingly taking on the appearance of being a test of patriotism." At the end of the hard-fought campaign, Williams won by a majority of over 220 votes.

== Duties and regulations ==
The Universities of Oxford and Cambridge Act 1877 continued a process of reform imposed by Parliament that had begun in the middle of the 19th century, and empowered a group of commissioners to lay down new statutes for the university and its colleges. The commissioners' powers included the ability to rewrite trusts and directions attached to gifts that were 50 years old or more. The statutes governing the Boden chair were revised by the commissioners in 1882; there was no mention thereafter of Joseph Boden's original proselytizing purpose. The professor was required to "deliver lectures and give instruction on the Sanskrit Language and Literature", to contribute towards the pursuit and advancement of knowledge, and to "aid generally the work of the University." He had to provide instruction for at least four days each week during at least twenty-one weeks each year, without further fee, to all students who had given him "reasonable notice" of attending, and to deliver public lectures. Instead of election by Convocation, the new statutes provided that the electors would be the Secretary of State for India, the Corpus Christi Professor of Comparative Philology, the Sanskrit Professor at the University of Cambridge, someone nominated by Balliol College and someone nominated by the university's governing body. Revisions by the commissioners to the statutes of Balliol College in 1882 provided that the Boden professor was to be a Fellow of the college from then onwards.

Further changes to the university's internal legislation in the 20th and early 21st centuries abolished specific statutes for the duties of, and rules for appointment to, individual chairs such as the Boden professorship. The University Council is now empowered to make appropriate arrangements for appointments and conditions of service, and the college to which any professorship is allocated (Balliol in the case of the Boden chair) has two representatives on the board of electors. In 2008, Richard Gombrich said that he had had to "fight a great battle" in 2004 to ensure that another Boden professor was appointed to succeed him on his retirement, and credited his victory to the university's realization that it was the last chair in Sanskrit left in the United Kingdom.

== List of professors ==
Boden Professors of Sanskrit with details of their work and background
Name	Years	Education (Note: At the University of Oxford, unless otherwise indicated)	College as Professor	Notes
Horace Wilson	1832–60	St Thomas' Hospital, London	Exeter (Note: Wilson matriculated as a member of Exeter on 21 May 1833 and was awarded a Master of Arts degree by decree by the university three days later. There is no record of him in Alumni Oxonienses being appointed as a Fellow of an Oxford college.)	Wilson trained as a surgeon and learnt Hindustani en route to India to work for the East India Company, where he studied Sanskrit and other languages. He published articles in the journal of the Asiatic Society of Bengal, of which he was secretary for 21 years. Opposing compulsory Christian tuition for Indian students, he favoured traditional Indian education mixed with studies of the English language and Western learning, although he regarded Indian culture as inferior to that of the Western world. He arrived in Oxford in 1833 after his election in 1832, but moved to London in 1836 to be librarian at East India House, the company's headquarters, travelling back to Oxford as necessary to carry out his duties. He held both positions until his death in 1860.
Monier Williams	1860–99	Balliol and University colleges	Balliol (from 1882) (Note: According to Alumni Oxoniensis, he did not hold a college fellowship until the chair was allocated to Balliol in 1882.)	Williams (who became Sir Monier Monier-Williams in 1887) was born in India, the son of an army officer. Educated in England, he trained for the East India Company's civil service at the company's college, but news of the death of his brother in battle in India prompted him to return to Oxford and study Sanskrit with Wilson, winning the Boden scholarship. Graduating in 1844, he was professor of Sanskrit, Persian and Hindustani at the company's college until 1858, when it closed after the Indian rebellion. As Boden professor, he wanted to create stronger links between India and England with the creation of a specialist institute at Oxford. His advocacy and fundraising at home and overseas led to the Indian Institute opening in 1884 (completed 1896), and he gave about 3,000 manuscripts and books to its library. He retired from teaching in 1887; Arthur Macdonell was appointed as his deputy in 1888 and in due course succeeded him.
Arthur Macdonell	1899–1926	University of Göttingen, Corpus Christi College, and University of Leipzig	Balliol (Note: When Macdonell was the deputy professor, he was a member of Corpus Christi but did not hold a fellowship.)	Macdonell was born in India, where his father was a colonel in a local regiment, and lived there until he was six or seven. He spent several school years in Germany before studying Sanskrit and comparative philology at Göttingen University. He studied literae humaniores (classics) at Oxford, also winning scholarships in German, Chinese and Sanskrit. After lecturing in German and Sanskrit at Oxford and obtaining his doctorate from Leipzig, he was appointed as deputy to Monier-Williams in 1888, succeeding him in 1899. Macdonell developed the library and museum of the Indian Institute, raised funds in India for a scholarly edition of the Mahābhārata, and helped the Bodleian Library acquire many Sanskrit manuscripts. His main scholarly interest was Vedic Sanskrit, producing books on its mythology and grammar, and editions of some Vedic texts.
Frederick Thomas	1927–37	Trinity College	Balliol	Thomas read classics and Indian languages at Cambridge then spent six years teaching before becoming assistant librarian, later the librarian, of the India Office. After 24 years as librarian, arranging and studying the many books and manuscripts the India Office had acquired, he spent 10 years as Boden professor. His main scholarly interests were in philology (the study of language in written historical sources), but he also studied Buddhism, Jainism, philosophy, logic and myth. He also helped produce the standard translation of Harshacharita, a 7th-century Sanskrit biography.
Edward Johnston	1937–42	New College	Balliol	After winning the Boden scholarship, Johnston served in the Indian Civil Service from 1909 to 1924, acquiring a knowledge of Indian language and culture which he improved on his return to England. He also learnt some Tibetan and Chinese to use sources in those languages. His writings drew upon his practical knowledge of Indian life. His main work was an edition and translation of Buddhacarita ("Acts of the Buddha") by the 2nd-century author Aśvaghoṣa, published between 1928 and 1936. As Boden professor, he helped to catalogue the Bodleian Library's Sanskrit manuscripts and to improve the Indian Institute's museum. The Times described his death as "a heavy loss ... to Sanskrit studies everywhere."
Thomas Burrow	1944–76	Christ's College, Cambridge, and the School of Oriental Studies, London	Balliol	Burrow studied classics and oriental languages at Cambridge, spending one year of his doctorate (on Prakrits, the later languages close to Sanskrit) in London. After two further years of research in Cambridge, he was assistant keeper in the Department of Oriental printed books and manuscripts at the British Museum for seven years, where he studied Dravidian languages, which thereafter was his main area of research and publication. As Boden professor, he taught Sanskrit, Pali and Prakrit; according to his successor, Richard Gombrich, Burrow may never have set any of his students the task of writing an essay. On field trips to India, he helped to record previously unstudied Dravidian languages. Gombrich described him as "amiable but socially passive and taciturn", and as "a single-minded scholar of great learning".
Richard Gombrich	1976–2004	Magdalen College and Harvard University	Balliol	Gombrich, the son of the art historian Sir Ernst Gombrich, was a Fellow of Wolfson College and university lecturer in Sanskrit and Pali from 1965 to 1976, when he was appointed to succeed Thomas Burrow. On his retirement in 2004, he helped to establish the Oxford Centre for Buddhist Studies, an institution affiliated to the university. He was its first academic director (2004–09) and thereafter was appointed its President. He served as general editor of the Clay Sanskrit Library. His writings include Buddhist Precept and Practice (1991), How Buddhism Began (1996) and various journal articles on Buddhist and other topics.
Christopher Minkowski	2005- 2023	Harvard College, University of Delhi and Harvard University	Balliol	Minkowski obtained a diploma in Hindi from the University of Delhi and his PhD in Sanskrit and Indian Studies from Harvard. After various academic posts, including a year at Wolfson College, he was a professor at Cornell University from 1989 until his appointment at Oxford. His research interests include intellectual history and the history of science within the 16th to 18th centuries, and he is part of a group at Oxford working on aspects of early modern South Asia.
James Mallinson	2023 onwards	University of Oxford and SOAS	Balliol	Mallinson was Reader in Sanskrit and Yoga Studies at SOAS, University of London from 2013 to 2023. Prior to his appointment at SOAS Mallinson worked as a principal translator for the Clay Sanskrit Library. He is the author of nine books, all of them translations and editions of Sanskrit texts on yoga, poetry, or epic tales. Mallinson has written numerous book chapters and papers on the history of yoga, in particular the early development of physical or Hatha Yoga, on which he is recognised as the world's leading expert. In 2014 he received a European Research Council Consolidator Grant worth €1.85 million for a five-year six-person research project on the history of Hatha Yoga. In 2018, he opened the SOAS Centre of Yoga Studies.

== See also ==
- List of professorships at the University of Oxford
