= L. S. Cousins =

Buddhist studies scholar

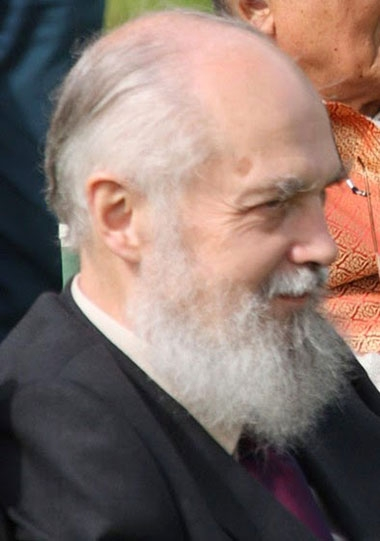
- Cousins in 2012
- Born: Lance Selwyn Cousins; 7 April 1942; Hitchin, England
- Died: 14 March 2015 (aged 72); Oxford, England
- Education: St John's College, Cambridge

Lance Selwyn Cousins (7 April 1942 – 14 March 2015) was a British scholar who specialised in the field of Buddhist Studies.

== Biography ==
Born in Hitchin, Hertfordshire, he studied history and oriental studies at Cambridge University, and took up a post in the Department of Comparative Religion at Manchester University as lecturer and then senior lecturer. After early retirement in the 1990s he settled in Oxford and continued to publish scholarly papers and reviews including a widely cited historical summary such as "The Dating of the Historical Buddha: A Review article," which was published in The Journal of the Royal Asiatic Society. He was a Fellow at Wolfson College University of Oxford and part of the faculty at the Oxford Centre for Buddhist Studies. Prior to this, he was briefly President (2002/3) of the Pali Text Society (PTS). Professor Richard Gombrich once described him as the leading authority in the West in the field of abhidhamma.

Cousins helped establish the Pali Canon on the web and assisted many publications being involved with a breadth of translations from Pali to English himself. He had completed two books by the time of his death that are likely to be published soon.

He received several awards including honorary professorships incorporating recognition of his contributions from among other places the Mahamakut Buddhist University, Bangkok, Thailand in 2013.

In addition to his academic work, he was also a teacher of Buddhist meditation in a Thai samatha tradition being a founder member of the Samatha Trust and the Samatha Association. He commenced samatha classes under Nai Boonman in 1963 at Hampstead. He was instrumental in founding the Cambridge University Buddhist Society and its samatha class in the 1960s. When he moved to Manchester in 1967, he started the Manchester University Buddhist Society and the class there that lead to the beginning of several similar classes in the rest of the UK and the eventual establishment of the Manchester Centre for Buddhist Meditation in Chorlton. He was an influential teacher and conducted several retreats incorporating the UK, particularly at the Samatha Centre, Greenstreete farm in Wales, The USA, Ireland and Sri Lanka.

He worked in the early 2000s with Somadeva Vasudeva, a visiting scholar from Kyoto University, on transliterating a number of sūtras of a newly discovered Dīrgha Āgama, including a fragment on when the consumption of meat is not appropriate for a monk. At the time of his death, he was preparing for publication a collection of lectures relating to meditation, to be edited by Sarah Shaw, and a translation of the Yamaka commentary and, with Charles Shaw, of the Yamaka. The first third of the latter has now been published: The Book of Pairs and its Commentary: A translation of the Yamaka and Yamakappakaraṇaṭṭhakathā, Vol I (2018), tr. C.M.M. Shaw and L.S. Cousins. It includes Lance's translation of the relevant portion of the ancient commentary, the Pañcappakaraṇa-aṭṭhakathā and is intended as the first of a planned three-volume translation of the whole Yamaka and its commentary.

== Publications ==
=== Book-length publications ===
- 1974. Buddhist Studies in Honour of I.B. Horner, ed. L .Cousins, A. Kunst and K.R. Norman. Dordrecht, Holland, D. Reidel Publishing Co.
- 1992. Special Issue in honour of K.R. Norman, Indo-Iranian Journal, ed. Cousins et al., 35 (2 & 3).
- 1995. Mahāniddesa Part III (index volume). Oxford, Pali Text Society.
- 1996. The Dispeller of Delusion (Sammohavinodanī), 2 vols, trans. Bhikkhu Ñāṇamoli, extensively revised for publication, with annotations and index, by L.S. Cousins, Nyanaponika Mahāthera and C.M.M. Shaw. Oxford, Pali Text Society.
- 1999. Reverse Index to the Mahāniddesa, with Y. Ousaka and M. Yamazaki, digital edition: http://hirose.sendai-nct.ac.jp/~ousaka/EngH.html
