= Edward Johnston (orientalist) =

British oriental scholar (1885–1942)

Edward Hamilton Johnston (26 March 1885 – 24 October 1942) was a British oriental scholar who was Boden Professor of Sanskrit at the University of Oxford from 1937 until his death.

== Life ==
Edward Hamilton Johnston was born on 26 March 1885; his father was Reginald Johnston, Governor of the Bank of England from 1909 to 1911. He was educated at Eton College before studying at New College, Oxford, switching to history after a year of mathematics and obtaining a first-class degree in 1907. He joined the Indian Civil Service, winning the Boden Sanskrit Scholarship during his probation, and worked in India from 1909 onwards in various capacities. He took the opportunity to retire in 1924 after working in India for 15 years, and returned to England. Thereafter he spent his time on the study of Sanskrit, later learning sufficient Tibetan and Chinese to make use of material available in those languages.

Although Johnston seems only to have published one article in India (on a group of medieval statues), his later works show that he had noted local Indian practices in agriculture and other areas, since he made reference to these in his analysis of Sanskrit texts. Between 1928 and 1936, he published an edition and translation of the Buddhacarita ("Acts of the Buddha") by the 2nd-century author Aśvaghoṣa; this was described by the writer of his obituary in The Times as his "magnum opus".

In 1937, he was elected Boden Professor of Sanskrit and Keeper of the Indian Institute at the University of Oxford, also becoming a Professorial Fellow of Balliol College. He started cataloguing the Sanskrit manuscripts acquired for the Bodleian Library by an earlier Boden professor, A. A. Macdonell, helped improve the museum of the Indian Institute, and worked on the manuscripts held by the India Office Library. He published several articles on a variety of topics.

Johnston married Iris May, daughter of Sir Henry May. Johnston's brother predeceased him and he then took his brother's children into his household. His family moved to safety in the United States during the Second World War while he stayed in Oxford, serving as an Air Raid Warden and in the Home Guard. He died on 24 October 1942 at the age of 57.

== Reputation ==
His obituary in The Times described his death as "a heavy loss not only to his friends and to Oxford but to Sanskrit studies everywhere." Writing in the Journal of the Royal Asiatic Society of Great Britain and Ireland, his predecessor as Boden Professor, F. W. Thomas, said that "friends and orientalists" will have "widely deplored" his death, since he was "favourably situated for a long continuation of the highly congenial work to which he had brought a vigorous competence." Thomas added that Johnston was "accessible and helpful" to his war-time students.
