= Recognised independent centre =

Status awarded to institutes and centres by Oxford University

A recognised independent centre (RIC) of Oxford University was a status awarded to acknowledge a special relationship with a small number of institutes and centres which are involved in teaching and research in their specialised areas in Oxford.

The University retired the status of RIC in August 2020, and the centres now operate under different arrangements.

== Overview ==
The status of RIC was awarded to educational charities based in the Oxford area which, while not part of the university, were recognised for their contribution to university research and teaching in contemporary and historical areas of interest. The formal designation was created in 2006. Five institutions were awarded RIC status.

While the RICs were independent financially and in governance they made a significant contribution to the university in research, tuition, and publishing. The university established a Joint Coordinating Committee for Recognised Independent Centres, which linked the university and RICs. The University Council and relevant faculties nominated members to sit on the governing bodies of the RICs.

A student at an RIC was not automatically a member of the university but could apply to use its facilities, as well as its libraries and manuscript collections. In practice the majority of students attached to RICs were also registered as students of Oxford University, and were members of colleges. Some academics held joint appointments made between university faculties and RICs.

== Recognised independent centres of Oxford University ==
Name	Founded	Notes
Oxford Centre for Buddhist Studies	2004	
Oxford Centre for Hebrew and Jewish Studies	1972	
Oxford Centre for Hindu Studies	1997	
Oxford Centre for Islamic Studies	1985	Gained royal charter in 2012
Oxford Institute for Energy Studies	1982	
