= Christopher Minkowski =

American academic (born 1953)

Christopher Zand Minkowski (/mɪŋˈkɔːfski, -ˈkɒf-/; born 13 May 1953) is an American academic, who was Boden Professor of Sanskrit at the University of Oxford from 2005 to 2023.

== Education and early career ==
Minkowski was educated at Gilman School before studying English at Harvard College. After receiving a diploma in Hindi from the University of Delhi in 1976, he returned to Harvard to obtain a master's degree, followed by a PhD in Sanskrit and Indian Studies in 1986. Thereafter, he taught at the University of Iowa and Brown University before a research year (as a junior research fellow) at Wolfson College, Oxford.

== Later career ==
Between 1989 and 2006, he taught at Cornell University, becoming Professor of Asian Studies and Classics. He was appointed Boden Professor of Sanskrit at the University of Oxford in 2005, a post that carries with it a professorial fellowship at Balliol College, Oxford.

Since 2024, he has been at the Johns Hopkins University, where he lectures on Sanskrit, and holds a Research Professorship in the Anthropology Department.

His writings include Priesthood in Ancient India (1991) as well as articles on Vedic religion and literature and the modern intellectual history of southern Asia. He includes as one of his recreations "further adventures in the improbable".
