= Graves Haughton =

Graves Haughton FRS
- Born: 1788
- Died: 28 August 1849 (aged 60–61); Saint-Cloud, France

Academic work
- Discipline: Oriental languages
- Main interests: Sanskrit and Bengali

Sir Graves Chamney Haughton FRS (1788 – 28 August 1849) was a British scholar of Oriental languages.

== Life and career ==
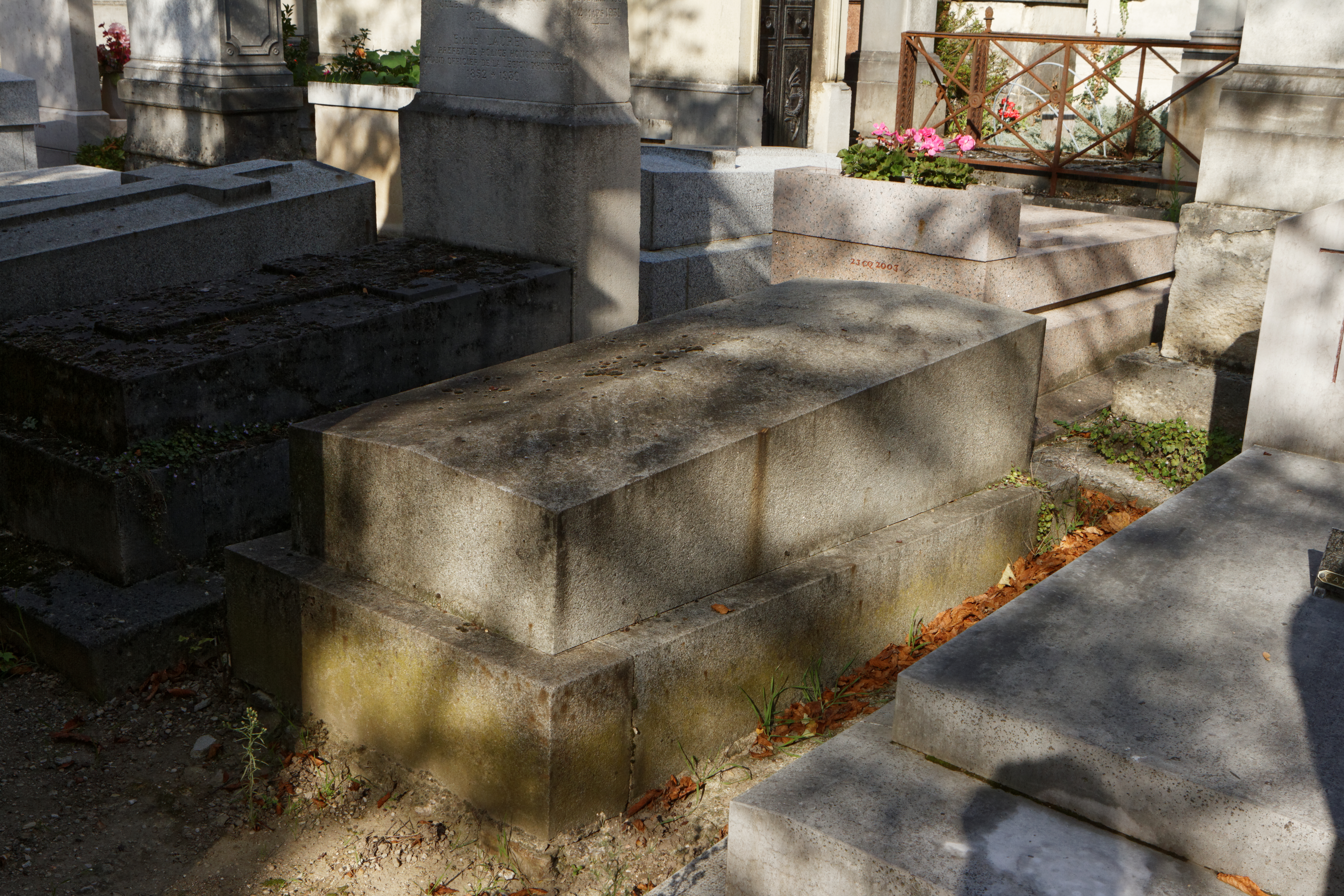
Père-Lachaise Cemetery.

Haughton, the son of a doctor, was educated in England before travelling to India in 1808 to take up a position in Bengal as a military cadet in the service of the East India Company. He became proficient in Hindustani and entered Fort William College in Calcutta to further his knowledge of oriental languages, winning several prizes. Ill-health caused by over-exerting himself in study caused him to return home in 1815. Two years later, he was appointed as an assistant professor at the East India College, Haileybury; he held the post of professor of Sanskrit and Bengali from 1819 to 1827, publishing instructional works in Bengali. He was awarded an honorary degree of Master of Arts by the University of Oxford in 1819, elected as a Fellow of the Royal Society (FRS) in 1821, and was a member of other learned institutions in Europe and India, including the Royal Asiatic Society which he helped to found. In 1833, he was created a knight of the Royal Guelphic Order.

He was supported by various prominent academics when he attempted in 1832 to be elected as the first Boden Professor of Sanskrit, but he stood down from the contest in favour of Horace Hayman Wilson, a decision which won him acclaim from many Oxford scholars and graduates. He published articles on various topics, including Sanskrit prepositions, the cause of cholera, and cause and effect as seen in Hindu and European thought. He died of cholera in the Paris suburb of Saint-Cloud, where he had resided towards the end of his life, on 28 August 1849. He left his estate to two daughters.
