= Indian Institute Library =

Library at the University of Oxford

Coordinates: 51.7551°N 1.2551°W

The Indian Institute Library was a library within the University of Oxford in Oxford, England. Opened in 1886, the library specialised in the history and culture of South Asia, Tibet and the Himalayas.

Until 1968, the library was located in the Indian Institute building on the corner of Holywell and Catte Street.

In 1968, the library was relocated to a newly constructed 'penthouse' on the roof of the New Bodleian Library. The move was not without controversy, since the original building had been constructed with the express intention of providing a permanent home to the institute. This resulted in the unusual situation of a lending library being based within a reference library. The library's collection is of international importance and includes over 100,000 volumes.

The library's reading room was closed on September 10, 2010. To access the books, readers now have to request their delivery to other reading rooms of the Bodleian library.

== See also ==
- Oxford Centre for Hindu Studies Library
