= Oxford Centre for Buddhist Studies =

Research institute in Oxford, England

The Oxford Centre for Buddhist Studies (OCBS) was founded in 2004 by Prof Richard Gombrich, Emeritus Boden Professor of Sanskrit at the University of Oxford. The centre is a recognised independent centre of the University of Oxford.

The OCBS is interdisciplinary in its approach to the broad field of Buddhist Studies and is most closely associated with the Buddhist Studies Unit of the Faculty of Oriental Studies in its interaction with the University. Through this unit the OCBS also maintains close links with the Faculty of Theology and the School of Anthropology.

The Centre arranges a broad range of seminars and lectures each year. It was responsible for the establishment of the first endowed Chair of Buddhist Studies in Oxford. The Numata Professor of Buddhist Studies is a Fellow of Balliol College, and a member of the Faculty of Oriental Studies.

The OCBS, in partnership with Equinox, publishes the Oxford Centre for Buddhist Studies Monographs Series, which is edited by Richard Gombrich.

== See also ==
- Lumbini_Buddhist_University
