= Boden Scholarship =

The Boden Scholarship at the University of Oxford was established in 1833 to support students learning Sanskrit.

== History and scholars ==
Lieutenant Colonel Joseph Boden, after whom the scholarship is named, served in the Bombay Native Infantry of the East India Company from 1781 until his retirement in 1807. He died on 21 November 1811, and his will provided that his estate should pass to the University of Oxford after his daughter's death to establish a professorship in Sanskrit. His daughter died in August 1827, the university accepted Boden's bequest in November 1827, and the first Boden Professor of Sanskrit was elected in 1832.

Boden's bequest is also used to provide scholarships "for the encouragement of the study of, and proficiency in, the Sanskrit Language and Literature". Under arrangements sanctioned by the Court of Chancery in 1830 and 1860, the scholarships (two at first, later increased to four) were open to students at the university under the age of 25, and were tenable for four years. The scholars received £50 annually in the 19th century. Women were allowed to compete for the scholarships from 1931 onwards.

As of 2012, scholarships are tenable only for two years, with the possibility of extension to a third year, and are open to all graduate members of the university (apart from those whose "vernacular language is any Indian language") under the age of 30 and who have not been at Oxford for more than three years. The number of scholars and the value of the award are no longer set and are decided by the university's Faculty of Oriental Studies.

== Scholars ==
- William Alder Strange (1833)
- Alexander Forbes, later Bishop of Brechin.
- Edward Johnston, Indologist
- Robert Payne Smith (later Dean of Canterbury)
- Brajendranath De, ICS, Divisional Commissioner (Acting), Burdwan, Bengal
- Har Dayal later founder of the Ghadar Party
- Arthur Venis, Sanskrit Scholar
