= Marjorie Wheeler-Barclay =

American historian

Marjorie Wheeler-Barclay is an American historian and university teacher who is the Charles A. Dana Professor of History at Randolph College. She specializes in medieval and modern European history, with a particular emphasis on the history of Britain. She is the author of The Science of Religion in Britain: 1860–1915, a book that has been called a "major contribution to the history of ideas, the history of religion, and British history". The work, first printed in 2010, studies the lives of Friedrich Max Muller, Edward B. Tylor, Andrew Lang, William Robertson Smith, James G. Frazer and Jane Ellen Harrison and traces the interplay of religion between academia and society, as well as each scholar's attempt to create a sober, scientific approach to the study of religion. Wheeler-Barclay has a Bachelor of Arts from the University of Illinois at Chicago and a Ph.D. from Northwestern University.

== Works ==
=== Books ===
- The Science of Religion in Britain, 1860–1915. University of Virginia Press. 2010.

=== Articles ===
- "Victorian Evangelicalism and the Sociology of Religion: The Career of William Robertson Smith". Journal of the History of Ideas. 54 (1): 59–78. January 1993. doi:10.2307/2709860. JSTOR 2709860.

=== Book reviews ===
- "After Ruskin: The Social and Political Legacies of a Victorian Prophet, 1870–1920 by Stuart Eagles]. (2012)". The American Historical Review. 117 (3): 934–935.
