= Richard Gombrich =

British Indologist (born 1937)

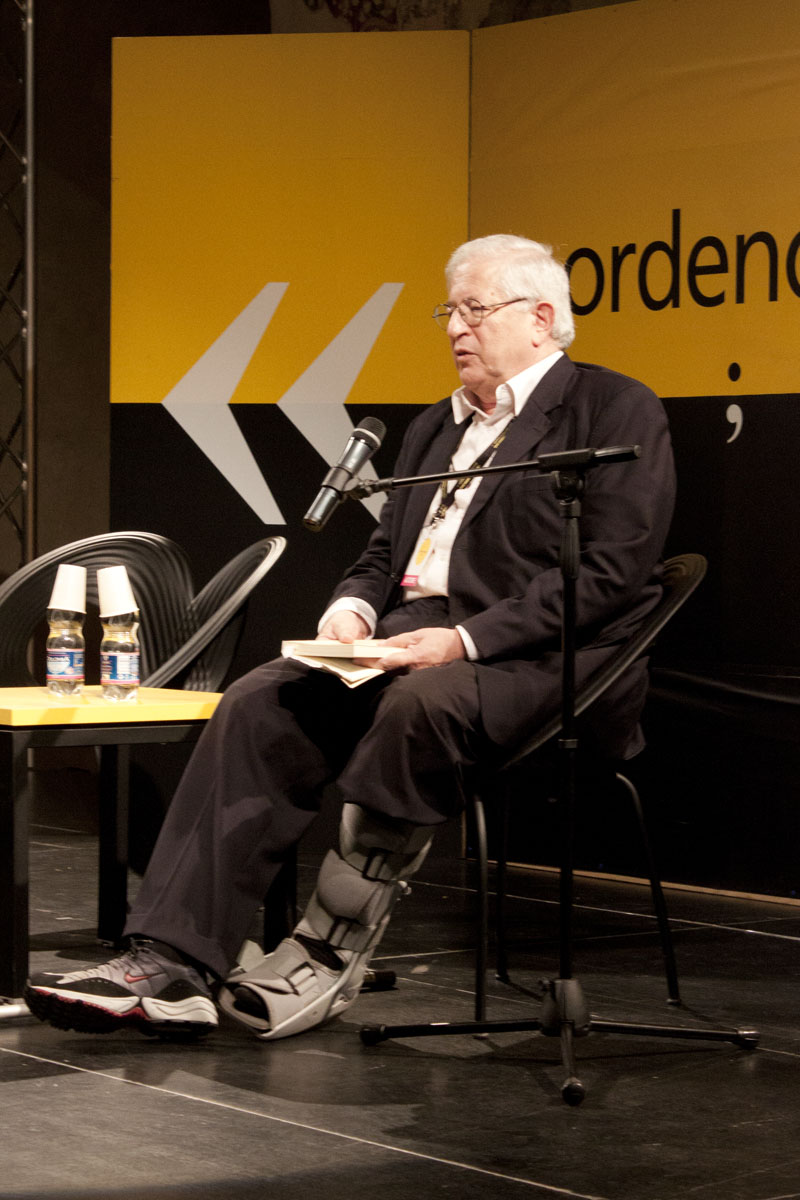
- Born: 17 July 1937 (age 89)
- Spouses: Dorothea Amanda Friedrich (m. 1964; div. 1984) Sanjukta Gupta (m. 1985)
- Children: Leonie Gombrich, Carl Gombrich
- Parents: Ernst Gombrich (father); Ilse Gombrich (mother)

Academic background
- Education: St Paul's School, London; Magdalen College, Oxford (B.A., D.Phil.); Harvard University (M.A.)
- Thesis: Contemporary Sinhalese Buddhism in Its Relation to the Pali Canon (1969)
- Doctoral advisor: Robert Charles Zaehner

Academic work
- Discipline: Indologist
- Institutions: University of Oxford
- Main interests: Sanskrit, Pali, Buddhism

Richard Francis Gombrich (/ˈɡɒmbrɪtʃ/; born 17 July 1937) is a British Indologist and scholar of Sanskrit, Pāli, and Buddhist studies. He was the Boden Professor of Sanskrit at the University of Oxford from 1976 to 2004. He is currently Founder-President of the Oxford Centre for Buddhist Studies. He is a past president of the Pali Text Society (1994–2002) and general editor emeritus of the Clay Sanskrit Library.

== Early life and education ==
Gombrich is the only child of classical pianist Ilse Gombrich (née Heller; 1910–2006), and Austrian-British art historian Sir Ernst Gombrich. He studied at St. Paul's School in London from 1950 to 1955 before attending Magdalen College, Oxford, in 1957. He received his B.A. from Oxford in 1961 and his DPhil from the same university in 1970. His doctoral thesis was entitled Contemporary Sinhalese Buddhism in its relation to the Pali canon. He received his M.A. from Harvard University in 1963.

== Early work ==
Gombrich's first major contribution in the field of Buddhist studies was an anthropological study of contemporary Sinhalese Buddhism entitled Precept and Practice: Traditional Buddhism in the Rural Highlands of Ceylon (1971). This study emphasised the compatibility between the normative Theravada Buddhism advocated in canonical Theravadin texts and the contemporary religious practices of Sinhalese Buddhists.

Contemporary Sinhalese religious practices often include such elements as sorcery and the worship of yakshas and Hindu deities; previous scholars of Buddhist studies had interpreted these practices as contradictory to or corruptions of the orthodox Buddhism of the Pāli Canon. Gombrich argues in Precept and Practice that, rather than being the mark of later corruptions of Theravada Buddhism, these practices can be traced to early periods in Buddhist history.

Furthermore, since the worship of Hindu deities and rituals involving sorcery are never explicitly forbidden to lay people in the Pāli Canon, Gombrich argues against viewing such practices as contradictory to orthodox Buddhism. It is also in Precept and Practice that Gombrich lays out his distinction between Buddhism at the cognitive level and Buddhism at the affective level.

At the cognitive level, Sinhalese Buddhists will attest to believing in such normative Buddhist doctrines as anatta, while, at the same time, their actions indicate a supposed affective acceptance of, for example, an individual, transmigrating soul. Gombrich's notion of a cognitive/affective divide in Sinhalese Buddhism has since come under criticism; Stanley Jeyaraja Tambiah considered it simplistic and insupportable.

== Major contributions and concepts ==
Gombrich's recent research has focused more on the origins of Buddhism. He stresses the importance of relating Buddhist texts and practices to other Indian religions. Rather than studying Buddhism, Jainism, and Vedism in isolation, Gombrich advocates a comparative method that has shed light on both Buddhist thought and the early history of Buddhism. He has been an active contributor to an ongoing discussion concerning the date of the Buddha's death, and has argued that data supplied in Pali texts composed in Sri Lanka enable us to date that event to about 404 BCE.

Whilst an undergraduate, Gombrich helped to edit the volume of papers by Karl Popper entitled "Conjectures and Refutations". Since then, he has followed this method in his research, seeking the best hypothesis available and then trying to test it against the evidence. This makes him oppose both facile scepticism and the quest for a method which can in any way substitute for the simple need for critical thought.

He was general editor of the Clay Sanskrit Library from its founding until February 2008.

== Meaning of the term "Gombrichian" in Buddhist studies ==
The term "Gombrichian" had already been coined in reference to Ernst Gombrich for some decades, and continues to be used in the context of art history with that denotation (e.g., "...a Gombrichian willingness to appeal to experimental evidence"), however, the use of "Gombrichian" in reference to Richard Gombrich has an entirely different denotation. In a review of 2003, Jon S. Walters defended the "Gombrichian" approach to textual tradition against the view attributed to Anne M. Blackburn that "colonial/Orientialist" scholarship is "epitomized here by Richard Gombrich". Whereas the earlier usage of "Gombrichian" seems to indicate a theory specifically set out by Ernst Gombrich in Art as Illusion, the usage of Gombrichian in the context of Buddhist Studies refers more vaguely to an emphasis on working with comparative reference to primary-source Pali texts found throughout Richard Gombrich's career.

== Personality and influence ==
Gombrich taught at Oxford for over 40 years. He was instrumental in Numata Foundation's endowing a chair in Buddhist Studies at Oxford. On taking mandatory retirement in 2004 he founded the Oxford Centre for Buddhist Studies and, with Geoff Bamford, the Society for the Wider Understanding of the Buddhist Tradition.

He holds strong views on higher education. In 2000, at the invitation of the Graduate Institute for Policy Studies at Tokyo University, he delivered a lecture "British Higher Education Policy in the last Twenty Years: The Murder of a Profession" and in 2008 he participated in the "Rally of the Impossible Professions: Beyond the False Promises of Security" hosted by the London Society of the New Lacanian School.

== Academic appointments ==
Gombritch was Harkness Fellow of the Commonwealth Fund from 1961 to 1963. He then began lecturing at the University of Oxford in 1965, before being appointed Boden Professor of Sanskrit (and fellow of Balliol College), in 1976, a post he retained until 2004.

While at Oxford, Gombrich was also a visiting professor at the University of Bristol (1981–82) and École des Hautes Études en Sciences Sociales (1982), and a visiting fellow at Princeton University (1986–87). In 1994, he delivered both the F. D. Maurice Lecture at King's College London and the Jordan Lecture at SOAS, in 1997 he delivered the Gonda Lecture at the Royal Netherlands Academy of Arts and Sciences and in 1998 he delivered the Edmund Perry Lecture at Northwestern University. He was co-editor of the Journal of the Pali Text Society from 1996 to 2002.

Since leaving Oxford, Gombritch has held visiting professorships at Dongguk University, Seoul, and Hong Kong University, both in 2008.

== Awards ==
The Asiatic Society of Calcutta awarded Gombrich the SC Chakraborty medal in 1993. The following year, he received the Sri Lanka Ranajana decoration from the President of Sri Lanka.

== Publications ==
- Precept and practice: traditional Buddhism in the rural highlands of Ceylon. Oxford: Clarendon Press, 1971.
- Teach yourself Sanskrit: an introduction to the classical language. (Editor: Coulson, Michael) London: Hodder & Stoughton, 1976.
- The perfect generosity of Prince Vessantara. (Co-author: Cone, Margaret) Oxford: Clarendon Press, 1977.
- On being Sanskritic: a plea for civilized study and the study of civilization. Oxford: Clarendon Press, 1978.
- Balasooriya, Somaratna, André Bareau, Richard Gombrich, Siri Gunasingha, Udaya Mallawarachchi and Edmund Perry eds. Buddhist studies in honour of Walpola Rahula. London: Gordon Fraser, 1980.
- Bechert, Heinz and Richard Gombrich eds. The world of Buddhism: Buddhist monks and nuns in society and culture. London: Thames & Hudson, 1984. Paperback ed. 1991.
- Dhammapala, Gatare, Richard Gombrich and K.R. Norman eds. Buddhist studies in honour of Hammalava Saddhatissa. Nugegoda, Sri Lanka: Hammalava Saddhatissa Felicitation Volume Committee, University of Sri Jayewardenepura, 1984.
- Theravåda Buddhism: a social history from ancient Benares to modern Colombo. London: Routledge and Kegan Paul, 1988.
- Gombrich, Richard, and Gananath Obeyesekere. Buddhism transformed: religious change in Sri Lanka. Princeton, NJ: Princeton University Press, 1988. Paperback ed. 1990.
- Editor. Indian ritual and its exegesis. Delhi: Oxford University Press, 1988.
- Buddhist precept and practice. (Revised edition of 1. above.) Delhi: Motilal Banarsidas, 1991.
- How Buddhism began: the conditioned genesis of the early teachings. London: The Athlone Press, 1996.
- Religious experience in early Buddhism? Eighth Annual BASR Lecture, 1997. British Association for the Study of Religions Occasional Paper 17. Printed by the University of Leeds Printing Service, Leeds [1998].
- Kindness and compassion as means to Nirvana. (1997 Gonda Lecture) Amsterdam: Royal Netherlands Academy of Arts and Sciences, 1998.
- Translation of 9 above into Japanese, trsln Iwao Shima, Kyoto: Hozokan, 2002.
- Translation of 8 above into Japanese, trsln, 2006.
- Theravåda Buddhism: a social history from ancient Benares to modern Colombo. 2nd rev. ed. London: Routledge, 2006.
- How Buddhism began: the conditioned genesis of the early teachings. 2nd ed. London: Routledge, 2006.
- Gombrich, Richard and Cristina Scherrer-Schaub, ed.: Buddhist Studies: Papers of the 12th World Sanskrit Conference, vol.8, Delhi: Motilal Banarsidass, 2008

Selected recent articles

- Making mountains without molehills: the case of the missing stupa. Journal of the Pali Text Society, vol. 15: 141–143, 1990.
- Reflections of an Indologist. In Religious pluralism and unbelief: Studies critical and comparative. I. Hamnett, editor. London and New York: Routledge, 243–261, 1990.
- Påtimokkha: purgative. In Studies in Buddhism and culture in honour of Professor Dr. Egaku Mayeda on his sixty-fifth birthday. The Editorial Committee of the Felicitation Volume for Professor Dr. Egaku Mayeda, editors. Tokyo: Sankibo Busshorin, 31–38, 1991.
- Can we know or control our futures? In Buddhist essays: A miscellany. G. Piyatissa Thera, L. Perera and K. Goonesena, editors. London: Sri Saddhatissa International Buddhist Centre, 240–252, 1992.
- The Buddha's Book of Genesis? Indo-Iranian Journal, vol. 35: 159–178, 1992.
- Dating the Buddha: a red herring revealed. In The Dating of the Historical Buddha/Die Datierung des historischen Buddha. Part 2. (Symposien zur Buddhismusforschung, IV,2) Heinz Bechert, editor. Göttingen: Vandenhoeck & Ruprecht, 237–259, 1992.
- Why is a khattiya called a khattiya? the Aggaññasutta revisited. Journal of the Pali Text Society, vol. XVII: 213–214, 1992.
- A momentous effect of translation: the "vehicles" of Buddhism. Apodosis: Essays presented to Dr. W.W. Cruickshank to mark his 80th birthday. St. Paul's School, London; 34–46, 1992.
- Buddhist prediction: how open is the future? Predicting the Future. Leo Howe, Alan Wain, editors. Cambridge; Cambridge University Press, 144–168, 1993.
- Buddhism in the modern world: secularization or protestantization? In Secularization, rationalism and sectarianism. Essays in honour of Bryan R. Wilson. Eileen Barker, James A. Beckford, Karel Dobbelaere, editors. Oxford; Clarendon Press, 1993.
- Understanding early Buddhist terminology in its context. Pali Daejangkang Urimal Olmgim Nonmon Moum II / "A Korean Translation of Pali Tipitaka Vol. II", 74–101, Seoul, 1993.
- The Buddha and the Jains: a reply to Professor Bronkhorst. Asiatische Studien XLVIII 4 1994, 1069–196.
- The monk in the Påli Vinaya: priest or wedding guest? Journal of the Pali Text Society, vol. XXI, 1995: 193–197.
- The earliest Brahmanical reference to Buddhism? Relativism, Suffering and Beyond. Essays in memory of Bimal K. Matilal, eds. P. Bilimoria and J. N. Mohanty. Delhi; OUP, 1997, 31–49.
- Is Dharma a good thing? Dialogue and Universalism no. 11–12, 1997, 147–163.
- The Buddhist attitude to thaumaturgy. Bauddhavidyasudhakarah: studies in honour of Heinz Bechert on the occasion of his 65th birthday, eds. Petra Kieffer-Pülz and Jens-Uwe Hartmann. Swisttal-Odendorf: Indica et Tibetica, 1997, 166–184.
- Obituary of the Venerable Dr Walpola Rahula. The Middle Way, vol. 73, no. 2, 1998, 115–119.
- Introduction. Sir William Jones 1746–1974, A Commemoration, ed. Alexander Murray. Oxford: OUP, 1998, 3–15.
- Organized bodhisattvas: a blind alley in Buddhist historiography. SËryacandråya: Essays in Honour of Akira Yuyama, eds. Paul Harrison and Gregory Schopen. Swisttal-Odendorf: Indica et Tibetica, 1998, 43–56. Reprinted in Studies in Hindu and Buddhist Art, ed. P. K. Mishra. New Delhi, Abhinav Publications, 1999.
- Discovering the Buddha’s date. Buddhism for the New Millennium, ed. Lakshman S. Perera. London; World Buddhist Foundation, 2000, 9–25.
- A visit to Brahmå the heron, Journal of Indian Philosophy, v.29, April 2001, 95–108.
- Another Buddhist criticism of Yåjñavalkya, Buddhist and Indian Studies in Honour of Professor Sodo Mori, Hammatsu: Kokusai Bukkyoto Kyokai, 2002, 21–23.
- “Obsession with origins”: attitudes to Buddhist studies in the old world and the new, Approaching the Dhamma: Buddhist texts and practices in South and Southeast Asia, eds. Anne M. Blackburn & Jeffrey Samuels. Seattle: BPS Pariyatti Editions, 2003, 3–15.
- Merit detached from volition: how a Buddhist doctrine came to wear a Jain aspect, Jainism and Early Buddhism: essays in honor of Padmanabh S. Jaini, ed. Olle Qvarnström. Fremont: Asian Humanities Press, 2003, 427–439.
- Vedånta stood on its head: sakkåya and sakkåya-di††hi, 2nd International Conference on Indian Studies: proceedings, eds. Renata Czekalska & Halina Marlewicz, (Cracow Indological series IV–V), Krakow: Ksiegarnia Akademicka, 2003, 227–238.
- Understanding the Buddha: methods and results. Korean Society for Indian Philosophy, 2004.
- Major new discoveries about the Buddha’s teachings. Buddhism in the West, eds. Galayaye Piyadassi …[et al]. London: World Buddhist Foundation, 2005, 149–152.
- Thoughts about karma. Buddhism and Jainism, essays in honour of Dr. Hojun Nagasaki on his seventieth birthday, ed. Committee. Kyoto: Heirakuji Shoten, 2005, 740–726 (sic).
- Is the Sri Lankan war a Buddhist fundamentalism?, Buddhism, conflict and violence in modern Sri Lanka, ed. Mahinda Deegalle. (Routledge Critical Studies in Buddhism series), London & New York: Routledge, 2006, pp. 22–37.
- Parodie und Ironie in den Reden des Buddha. RELIGIONEN unterwegs, vol. 12, no. 2, Mai 2006, 4–8.
- Popperian Vinaya: conjecture and refutation in practice. Pramåˆak¥rti˙: papers dedicated to Ernst Steinkellner on the occasion of his 70th birthday, eds. Birgit Kellner …[et al]. Wien: Arbeitskreis für Tibetische und Buddhistische Studien Universität Wien, 2007, pp. 203–211.
- Why the monks took no delight in the Buddha’s words. South Asian Religions & Culture, v.2 (1), 2008, pp. 83–87.
- Why has British education gone so wrong, and why can’t we stop the rot? Popper’s nightmare. Hurly-Burly (Intl. Lacanian Jnl of Psychoanalysis), (1) Mai 2009, pp. 185–192.
