= William Hodge Mill =

English churchman and orientalist

William Hodge Mill (1792–1853) was an English churchman and orientalist, the first principal of Bishop’s College, Calcutta and later Regius Professor of Hebrew at Cambridge.

== Life ==
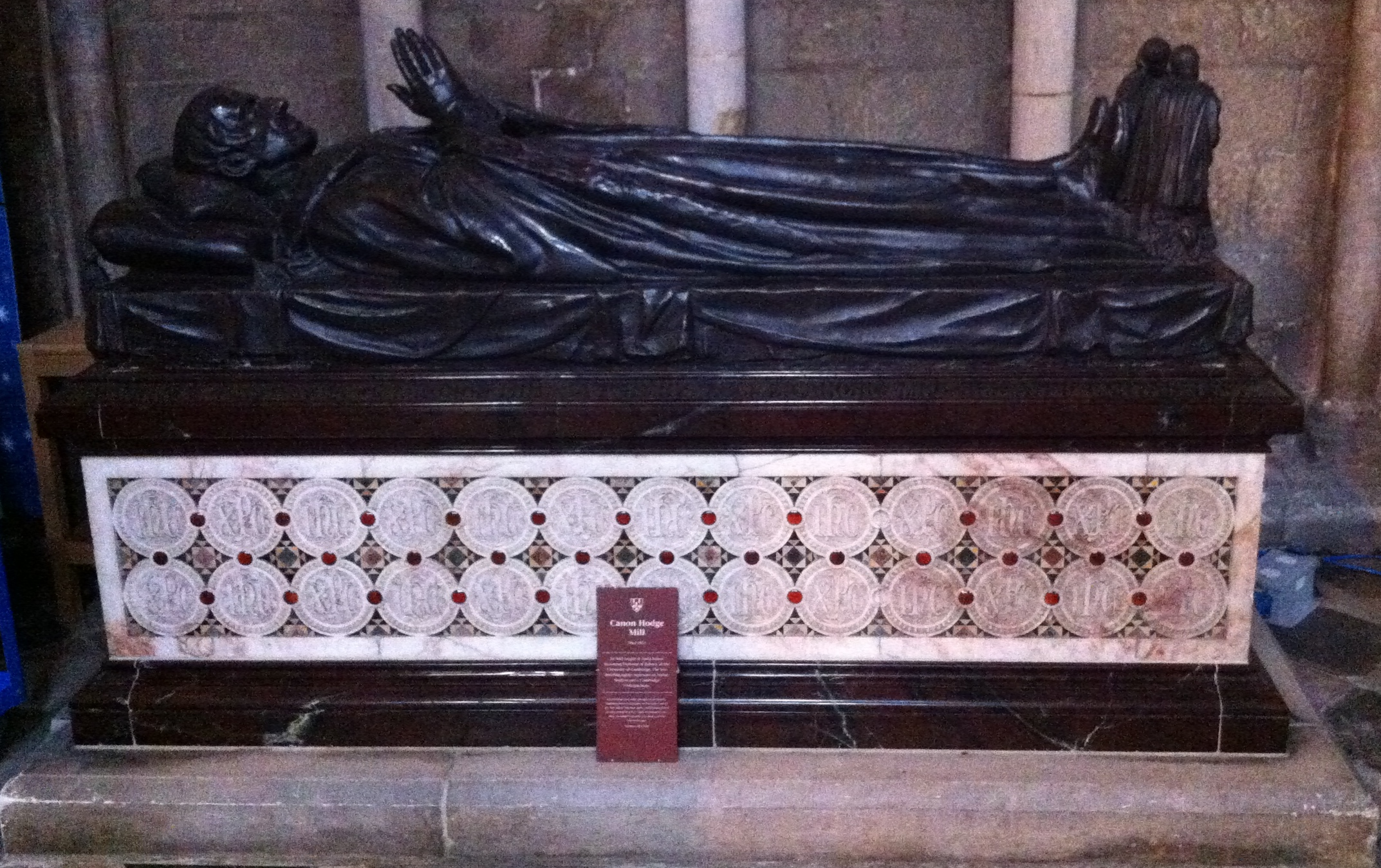
Memorial to Canon Hodge Mill in Ely Cathedral

He was son of John Mill, a native of Dundee, by his wife Martha née Hodge, and was born 18 July 1792 at Hackney, Middlesex. He was educated chiefly in private under Thomas Belsham. In 1809 he went to Trinity College, Cambridge, where he graduated B.A. as sixth wrangler in 1813, was elected Fellow in 1814, and proceeded M.A. in 1816. He took deacon's orders in 1817, and priest's in the following year, and continuing in residence at Cambridge.

In 1820 he was appointed the first principal of Bishop’s College, Calcutta, then just founded, under the superintendence of Bishop Thomas Fanshawe Middleton. There he assisted in the publication of works in Arabic, of which he had already gained some knowledge, and addressed himself to the study of the Indian vernaculars and Sanskrit, and he co-operated in the work of the Sanskrit and other native colleges. He was also a leading member of the Bengal Asiatic Society (vice-president 1833–7), and supported the society's Journal, then just founded, his contributions extending from vol. ii. to vol. vi. He also deciphered of several inscriptions, then little understood, especially those on the pillars at Allahabad and Bhitari.

Mill's health obliged him to return to Europe in 1838. He was appointed in 1839 chaplain to William Howley, Archbishop of Canterbury, and in the same year Christian Advocate on the Hulse foundation at Cambridge. In 1848 he became Regius Professor of Hebrew in the same university, with a canonry at Ely Cathedral. His lectures were chiefly on the text of the Psalms. He died 25 December 1853, at Brasted, Kent, a living to which he had been presented by the archbishop in 1843. He was buried in Ely Cathedral on New Year's Eve. A portion of a window in the chapel of Trinity College, Cambridge, was subsequently (1862) filled with stained glass to his memory.

== Works ==
His major work is ‘Christa-saṅgītā’ (Calcutta, 1831, 8vo; 2nd edition, 1837), a translation of the Gospel-story into the metre and style of the Sanskrit purānas; it was originally suggested to Mill by a Hindu pundit, who was the main author of the first canto.

Other works of the same period are a Sanskrit translation of the Sermon on the Mount, and contributions to the Arabic translation of the Anglican prayer-book. His Christian Advocate's publication for 1840–4, ‘On the attempted Application of Pantheistic Principles to the Criticism of the Gospel,’ appeared in two editions, and is mainly directed against David Strauss. Mill also published theological lectures and sermons.

== Family ==
Mill married Maria, daughter of James Ruthven Elphinstone. Their daughter Maria Elphinstone Mill married Benjamin Webb.
