= Indian Institute =

Former institute at the University of Oxford

Coordinates: 51°45′17.5″N 1°15′15.0″W

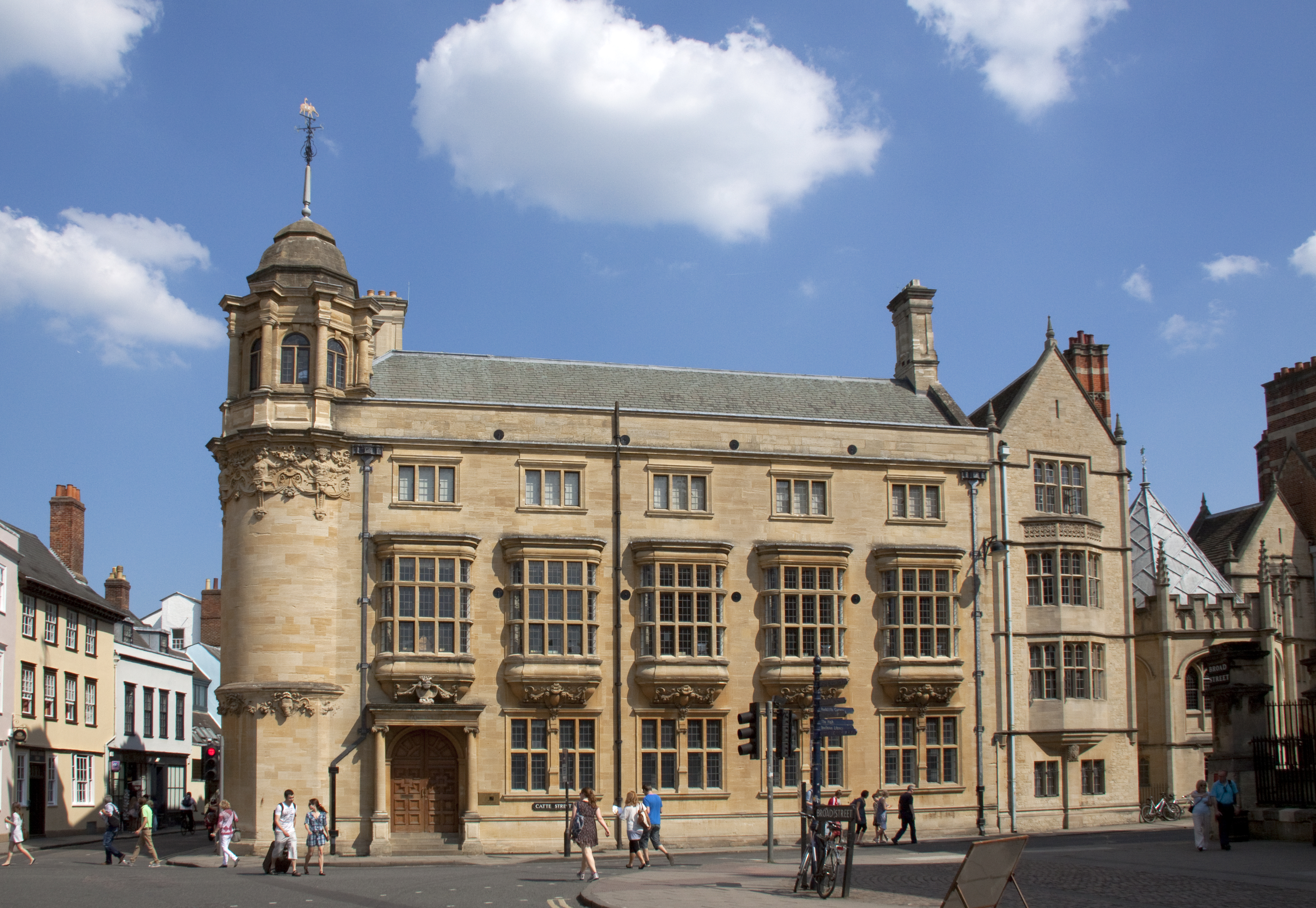
Indian Institute building seen from the north-west

The Indian Institute was an institute within the University of Oxford, focusing on the study of South Asia. The Institute was founded in 1883. Its former building stands at the north end of Catte Street, on the corner with Holywell Street, and facing down Broad Street from the east.

The Institute closed in 1968, at which point its building was repurposed for use by the Faculty of History. Since 2005, the building has been occupied by the Oxford Martin School.

== History and building ==
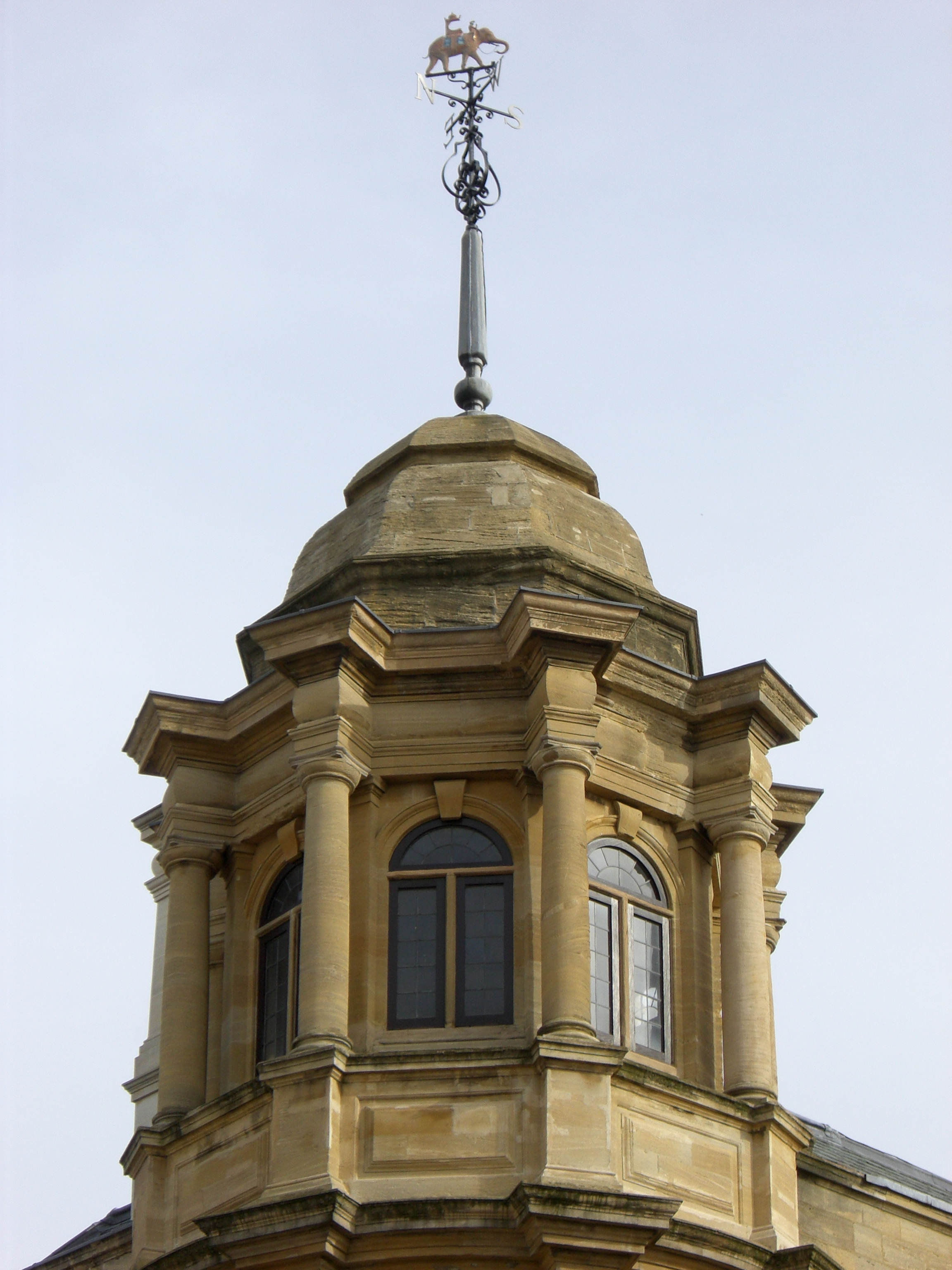
Corner cupola with elephant weathervane

It was started by Sir Monier Monier-Williams in 1883 to provide training for the Indian Civil Service of the British Raj.

In June 1881, plans were submitted to the University of Oxford's Hebdomadal Council to build an Indian Institute. The original site was occupied by four old buildings. The building was designed by Basil Champneys and the first section opened in 1884. Originally there was a low shop to the south, but neighbouring Hertford College has now encroached on the Institute with a much taller building. The Institute was built of Taynton stone in the style of the English Renaissance, with different oriental details to the designs of Champneys. In 1974 Nikolaus Pevsner observed that the rounded corner cupola made an excellent point de vue at the east end of Broad Street.

Along with the library (see below), the institute contained lecture rooms and a museum. Some contents of the museum are now present in the Ashmolean and Pitt Rivers Museums. The original Indian Institute building is now the Oxford Martin School of the University of Oxford, the History Faculty having moved first to the old City of Oxford School building on George Street and later to the Schwarzman Centre for the Humanities, and its library to the Radcliffe Camera.

== Indian Institute Library ==
The Indian Institute Library opened in 1886. It became a dependent library of the Bodleian Library, the main library of the University, in 1927. It specialises in the history and culture of South Asia, especially the Himalayas and Tibet. The library was formerly located in the Indian Institute building, but was moved to the top floor of the Weston Library.

== Indian Institute Museum ==
The Museum was an integral part of Monier-Williams’ design, modelled to some extent on the India Museum in South Kensington. Monier-Williams acquired some pieces during his fund-raising and collecting tour of India in 1883–1884, including from the International Exhibition, at Calcutta, and arranged for regional representatives to send objects to Oxford. Babu T. N. Mukharji was commissioned to catalogue the collections in 1886 (but he never finished doing so). The installation of the museum was done by Dr Heinrich Lüders, assisted by Mr. Long of the Pitt Rivers Museum, and completed in 1898. When Monier-Williams died in 1899, no financial provision had been made for running the museum. Gradually, the collections were dispersed: entomological and zoological collections to the University Museum; and many pieces to the Pitt Rivers Museum and the Ashmolean Museum. A summary catalogue of the museum was prepared by Mr. A. Rost (for a short handbook to the Institute, by Professor Arthur Macdonell, 1922, but never published).

== Closure ==
The building was financed entirely by private donors in India and Britain, for the sole purpose of constructing an edifice to house study for and on the Indian sub-continent. There was consequently great controversy in 1968, when the University's governing council evicted the Indian Institute from the premises without compensation, and then made a gift of the premises to the History Faculty, which specialises in European history to the exclusion of Indian history. The government of India filed a formal protest on behalf of the families of the original donors, who felt defrauded by the University's actions. The Oxford University Student Union went further still, accusing the University administration of racism in the decision.

== The Institute's aim ==
The aim of the Indian Institute was:

The work of fostering and facilitating Indian studies in the University; the work of making Englishmen, and even Indians themselves, appreciate better than they have done before the languages, literature and industries of India.

== See also ==
- University of Oxford
- Departments of the University of Oxford
- Buildings and structures in Oxford
- Oxford Centre for Hindu Studies
- Hertford College
- Oxford Martin School (currently housed in the old Indian Institute building)
