= Arthur Anthony Macdonell =

British Sanskrit scholar (1854–1930)

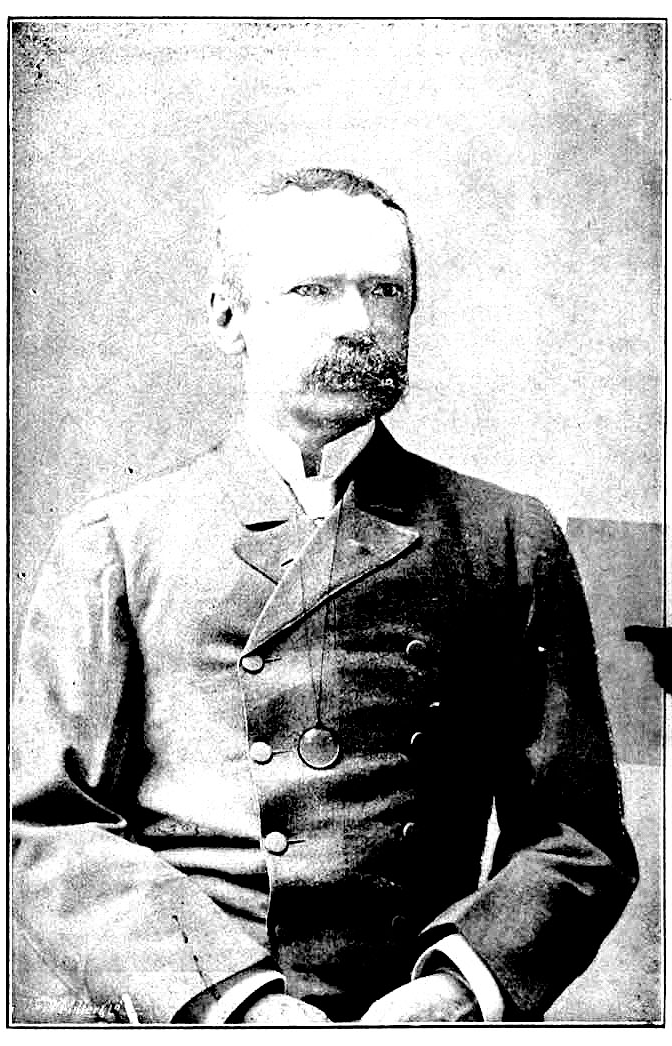
Macdonell in 1901

Arthur Anthony Macdonell, FBA (11 May 1854 – 28 December 1930) was an Indian-born British linguist and Sanskrit scholar.

== Biography ==
Macdonell was born at Muzaffarpur in the Tirhut region of the state of Bihar in British India, the son of Charles Alexander Macdonell, of the Indian Army. He was educated at Göttingen University, then matriculated in 1876 at Corpus Christi College, Oxford, gaining a classical exhibition and three scholarships (for German, Chinese, and the Boden Scholarship for Sanskrit). He graduated with classical honours in 1880 and was appointed Taylorian Teacher of German (language) at Oxford. In 1883 he obtained his PhD from the University of Leipzig, and then became Deputy Professor of Sanskrit at Oxford in 1888, and Boden Professor of Sanskrit in 1899 (a post that carried with it a fellowship of Balliol College, Oxford).

Macdonell edited various Sanskrit texts, wrote a grammar, compiled a dictionary, and published a Vedic grammar, a Vedic Reader, and a work on Vedic mythology; he also wrote a history of Sanskrit.

In 1924, Macdonell supervised the B.Litt. dissertation of future Indian parliamentarian Seeta Parmanand (née Ajgaonkar), "The Position of Women in Ancient India, as per the Dharmaśāstras."

== Selected works ==
- A Sanskrit-English Dictionary. London: Longmans, Green, and Co. 1893. OCLC 457790041.
- Vedic Mythology. Strassburg: Karl J. Trübner. 1897. OCLC 866585190.
- A History of Sanskrit Literature. New York: D. Appleton and Company. 1900.
- A Sanskrit Grammar for Beginners (Second ed.). London: Longmans, Green and Co. 1901 [1886]. OCLC 1256737328.
- Bṛhad-devatā, attributed to Saunaka: a summary of the deities and myths of the Rig-veda; Part I Introduction and text and Appendices. Harvard Oriental Series. Vol. V. Cambridge: Harvard University. 1904. OCLC 466061914.
- Bṛhad-devatā, attributed to Saunaka: a summary of the deities and myths of the Rig-veda; Part II Translation and Notes. Harvard Oriental Series. Vol. VI. Cambridge: Harvard University. 1904. OCLC 466061914.
- Vedic Grammar. Strassburg: Karl J. Trübner. 1910. OCLC 1141304420.
- MacDonell, Arthur Anthony; Keith, Arthur Barriedale (1912). Vedic Index of Names and Subjects. Vol. 1. London: John Murray. OCLC 877534019.
- MacDonell, Arthur Anthony; Keith, Arthur Barriedale (1912). Vedic Index of Names and Subjects. Vol. 2. London: John Murray. OCLC 877534019.
- A Vedic Reader for Students. Oxford: Clarendon Press. 1917. OCLC 954916863.
- Hymns from the Rigveda. London: Oxford University Press. 1922. OCLC 827188.
- Lectures On Comparative Religion. Calcutta: University of Calcutta. 1925. OCLC 557945422.
- India's past: A Survey of her Literatures, Religions, Languages, and Antiquities. Oxford: Clarendon Press. 1927. OCLC 39784406.
