= Mahesh Chandra Nyayratna Bhattacharyya =

Mahamahopadhyay Pandit Mahesh Chandra Nyayratna Bhattacharyya CIE
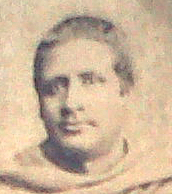
- Born: 22 February 1836; Narit, Bengal Presidency, British India (now West Bengal, India)
- Died: 12 April 1906 (aged 70)
- Known for: Sanskrit; Academic administration Social welfare Philosophy
- Title: Companion of the Order of the Indian Empire (1881); Mahamahopadhyay (1887)
- Scientific career
- Fields: Sanskrit, academics, academic administration, social welfare, philosophy
- Workplaces: Sanskrit College; University of Calcutta; Narit Nyayratna Institution; Hungarian Academy of Sciences; Bengal Asiatic Society; Indian Association for the Cultivation of Science; Anthropological Society of Bombay; Government Engineering College, Shibpur

Mahamahopadhyaya Pandit Mahesh Chandra Nyayratna Bhattacharyya CIE (22 February 1836 – 12 April 1906), was an Indian Sanskrit scholar during the Bengal Renaissance. He served as the principal of the Sanskrit College from 1876 to 1895 and was a colleague of Ishwar Chandra Vidyasagar.

== Biography ==
=== Personal life ===
Mahesh Chandra Nyayratna Bhattacharyya was born on 22 February 1836 into the Kulin Brahmin Bhattacharyya family of Narit. His father, Harinarayan Tarka Siddhanta, and his two uncles, Guruprasad Tarka Panchanan and Thakurdas Churamani, were Pandits. His elder brother, Pandit Madhab Chandra Sarvabhauma, was the Sabha Pandit of Mahishadal Raj.

In 1848, he married Mandakini, daughter of Pandit Ram Chand Tarkabagish, in Jehanabad, Hooghly.

He had a daughter, Manorama, and three sons: Manmatha Nath Vidyaratna Bhattacharyya (born April 1863), who became Indian Accountant General of Madras; Munindra Nath Bhattacharyya (born February 1868), who served as an attorney of the High Court of Calcutta; and Mahima Nath Bhattacharyya (born April 1870), who became a collector in the Department of Excise of the Government of India.

He died on 12 April 1906, at the age of 70.

=== Academic career ===
In 1876, he succeeded Prasanna Kumar Sarbadhikari as the principal of the Sanskrit College. During his 19-year tenure, he introduced the Sanskrit Title Examination to give titles to students in specialized areas of Sanskrit learning.

He later started a secondary Anglo-Sanskrit school in 1885 in his native village of Narit, named the Narit Nyayratna Institution.

He was also in charge of Sanskrit education during the Bengal presidency, which then comprised the present states of West Bengal, Bihar, and Orissa.

=== Life's works ===
He wrote and edited the books Kavya Prakash, Mimansa Darshan, and the Krishna Yajurveda. He also wrote pamphlets, including remarks on Dayananda Saraswati's Veda-Bhashya, Thulasidharan Mimansa, the authorship of Mrichchhakatika, and Lupta Samvatsara, Mahesh Chandra Nyayratna Bhattacharyya, ed. (1889). The Mimansa Darsana (Bibliotheca Indica) (in Hindi). Baptist Mission Press. He made contributions to the development of roads and infrastructure, including the establishment of tramways in Narit and Howrah.

=== Honours and titles ===
The title of Mahamahopadhyaya was conferred on 16 February 1887, on the occasion of the Jubilee of Queen Victoria's reign, in recognition of outstanding contributions to oriental learning. It entitled him to take rank in the Durbar immediately after the titular Rajas.

He was made a Companion of the Most Eminent Order of the Indian Empire (CIE) on 24 May 1881. He also held the title of Nyayratna.

He held positions such as Visitor at the Government Engineering College at Shibpur, Howrah.

Nyayratna Lane and Manmatha Bhattacharyya Street in Shyambazar, North Kolkata, are named after him.
