= James Atkinson (Persian scholar) =

English surgeon, artist and scholar (1780–1852)

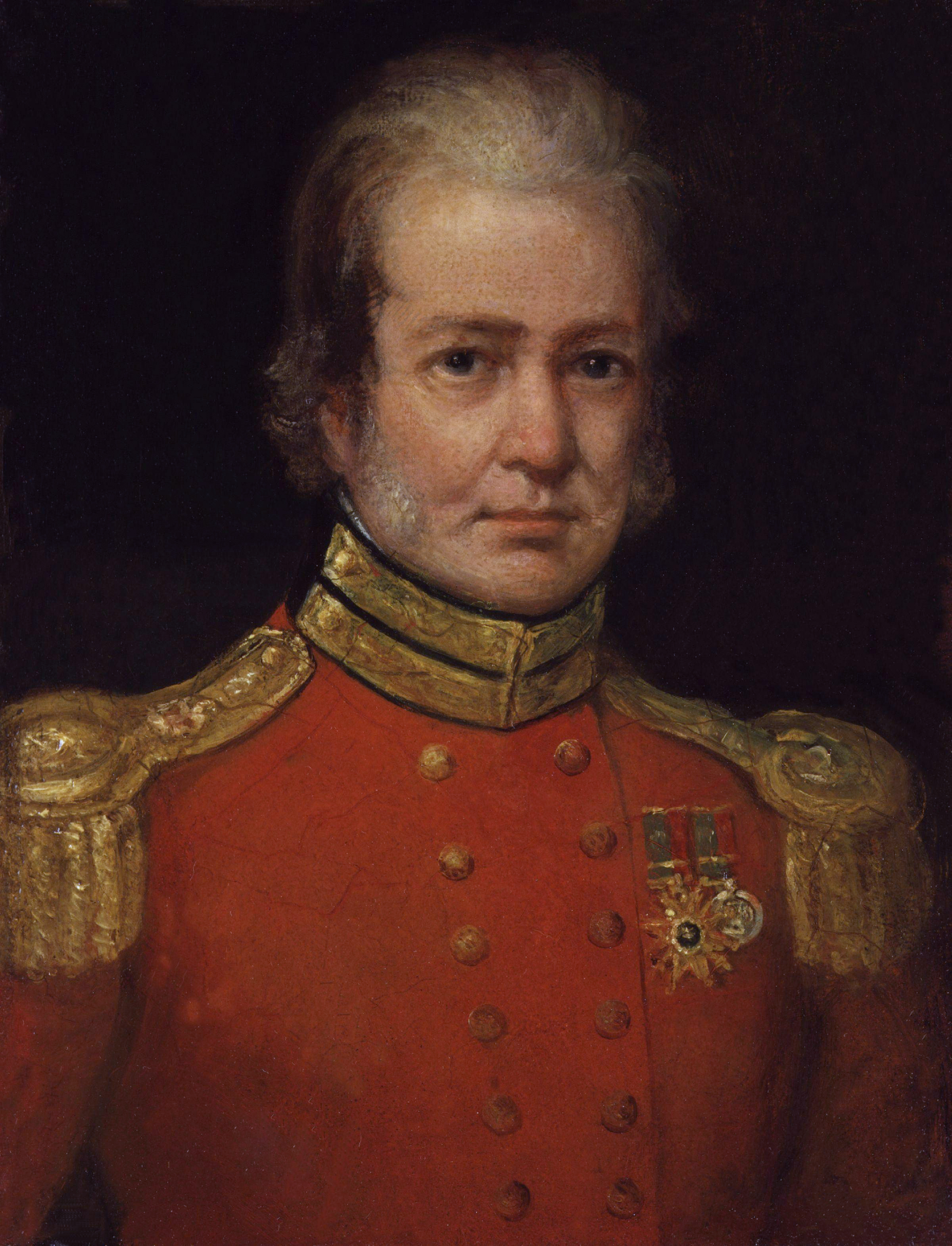
Self-portrait ca. 1845, National Portrait Gallery, London

James Atkinson (17 March 1780 – 7 August 1852) was a surgeon, artist and Persian scholar — "a Renaissance man among Anglo-Indians".

First arriving in India in 1802 as a surgeon, he was later appointed Assistant to the Assay Master at the Calcutta Mint in 1812; and was also editor of the Calcutta Gazette. Closely associated with the British colonial authorities and their community in India, he would meet Lord Minto and Lord Bentick, the latter with whom he had a notorious disagreement. He was best known for his study of Persian and his translation of a number of texts in to English. He was a gifted amateur artist and published a number of illustrated books, including on his travels in Afghanistan in the early 1840s.

== Early life ==
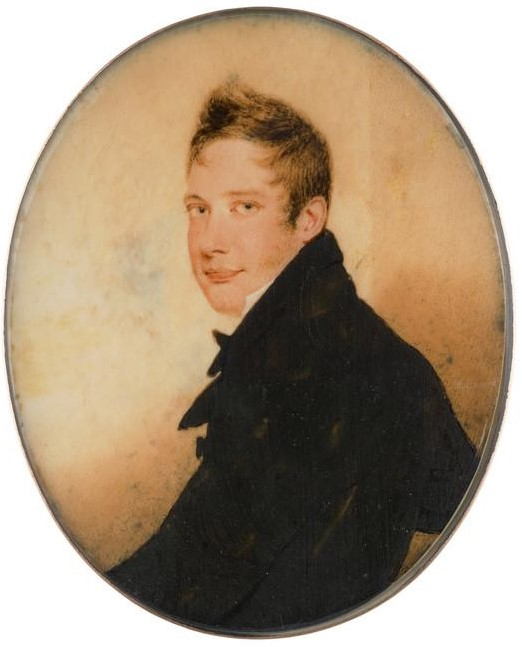
Miniature portrait of the young James Atkinson

Atkinson was born in Darlington, County Durham, England, the son of a woolcomber. He showed at an early age a remarkable gift for languages and portraiture and was enabled by the kindness of a friend to study medicine at Edinburgh and London. He first sailed to India in 1802 as Surgeon's Mate on board a ship of the Honourable East India Company (HEIC). On his second trip in 1805 he was appointed Assistant Surgeon in the Bengal service of the HEIC and placed in medical charge of the station of Backergunj near Dacca in present-day Bangladesh.

It was whilst at Backergunj that he began his study of Persian and other oriental languages. He became a close friend of Sir Charles D’Oyly who was the Collector of Dacca (1808–1812) and a keen amateur artist. George Chinnery stayed with D’Oyly during this period and both D’Oyly and Atkinson became his pupils becoming heavily influenced by his passion for painting Indian landscapes and village life.

== Calcutta ==
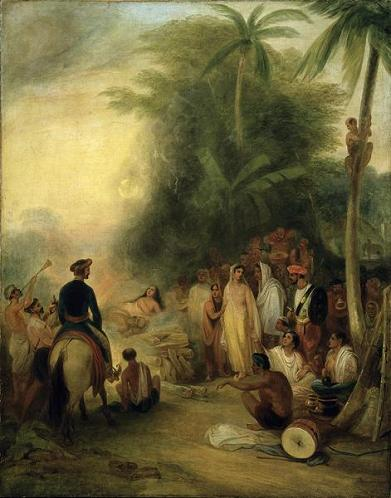
Suttee, a painting by James Atkinson 1831

It was Atkinson's proficiency with languages that brought him to the attention of The Lord Minto, the Governor General of India, who invited Atkinson to Calcutta in 1812 where he was appointed Assistant to the Assay Master at the Calcutta Mint (appointed Deputy Assay Master in 1818). The Assay Master was Horace Hayman Wilson, orientalist and Secretary to the Asiatic Society of Bengal, who published the first Sanskrit to English dictionary in 1819. For most of 1820 while Wilson was setting up the new Mint at Benares Atkinson worked alongside James Prinsep, the antiquarian and numismatist, at the Calcutta Mint.

The appointment at the Mint while not a sinecure as such afforded Atkinson a considerable amount of free time to pursue more academic pursuits. He published a 'free' translation of the poem Soohrab an extract from the Sha Nameh by the Persian poet Firdausi in 1814; Hatim Ta’ee, an old romance in the Persian language in 1818 for the use of the students at Fort William College where he held the Deputy Chair of Persian for that year; in 1819 The Aubid an eastern tale and in 1824 The City of Palaces, a collection of poems, the title of which became the epithet for Calcutta during the period of British rule.

Atkinson was a member of the Asiatic Society of Bengal, the Medical and Physical Society of Calcutta and sat on the committee of the Chowringhee Theatre.

== Government Gazette ==
Atkinson was also editor of the Calcutta Gazette, one of the earliest English language newspapers in India being founded in 1784. It was a weekly newspaper which had the exclusive rights of publishing Government announcements and advertisements affording it an increased circulation and the potential of increased advertising revenues from other sources. In 1815, the Government transferred these rights to the Bengal Military Orphan Society in order to provide an income for the charity as well as providing the orphans with a potential trade. The new paper was named the Government Gazette and was thenceforth printed from the Orphan Society's Press. Atkinson became the Editor of the new Government Gazette in 1815; in 1817, he became the Superintendent of the Press.

Under Atkinson the Government Gazette continued to be a great success publishing two issues per week from 1823 and in 1827 it was the most widely circulated of all the English language newspapers in Bengal. The Government Gazette included local and national news including extracts from English newspapers and those of Bombay and Madras, letters from correspondents, information on the customs and manners of the people of India as well as occasionally translations of Sanskrit hymns and Persian poetry. For the years 1825-1828 Atkinson leased the Press and the Government Gazette from the Orphan Society for an annual fee of 40,000 rupees effectively becoming its proprietor to run as his own business.

== Epic of Kings ==
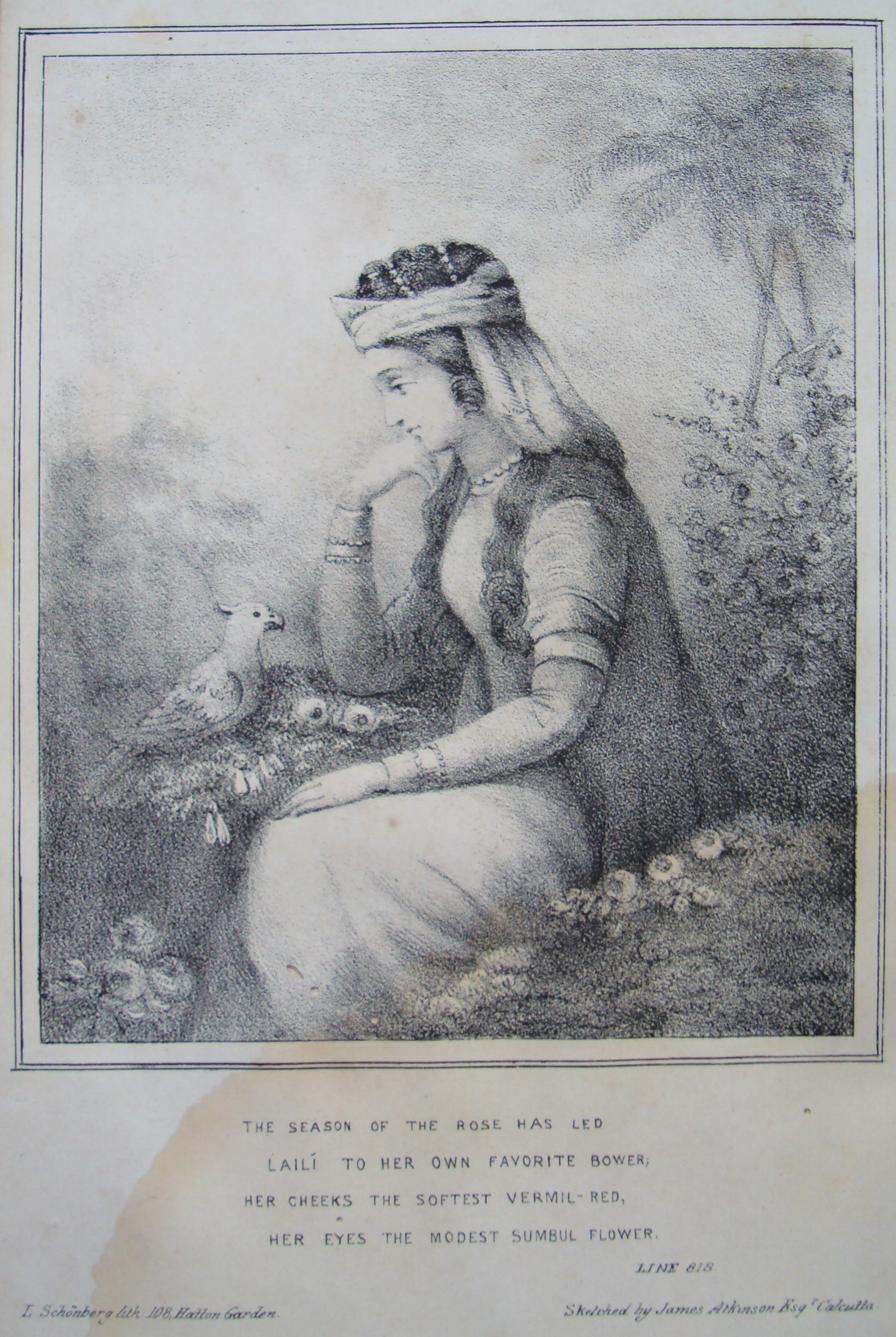
Laili and Majnun

In 1829 Atkinson left India after a disagreement with the newly arrived Governor General Lord Bentinck concerning Atkinson's role at the Government Gazette and he spent the next five years in England. It was at this time he took the opportunity to translate an abridged version of the Sha Nameh of the Persian poet Firdausi in prose and verse published in 1832 which won the gold medal of the Oriental Translation Fund. In the same year he published Customs and Manners of the Women of Persia, and their domestic superstitions, translated from the original Persian manuscript (Kitábi Kulsúm Naneh).

In 1833 he returned to India resuming his former profession of Surgeon with the HEIC, during which time he had published a translation of Nizami Ganjavi's Laili and Majnun and Makhzan ul Asrar (the Treasury of Secrets) by the Oriental Translation Fund in 1836.

== Afghanistan ==
In 1838, he was appointed Superintending Surgeon (ranking with Lieutenant-Colonel) of the Army of the Indus, Bengal Division. He proceeded with the Army under Sir John Keane on its ill-fated expedition into Afghanistan to replace the unpopular and weak, but pro-British, Shah Shoojah-ool-Moolk on the throne and oust Dost Mohamed Khan who had been making political overtures to the Russians. Atkinson was present at the storming of Ghuznee in July 1839 and the eventual capture of Kabul shortly after in the First Afghan War; for his part he was awarded the Order of the Dooranee Empire (3rd class). Atkinson was recalled to India in December 1840 to take up his post as Superintending Surgeon of the Cawnpore Division and thus avoided the fate of the remaining British garrison which was destroyed whilst attempting to withdraw to Jellalabad in the winter of 1841.

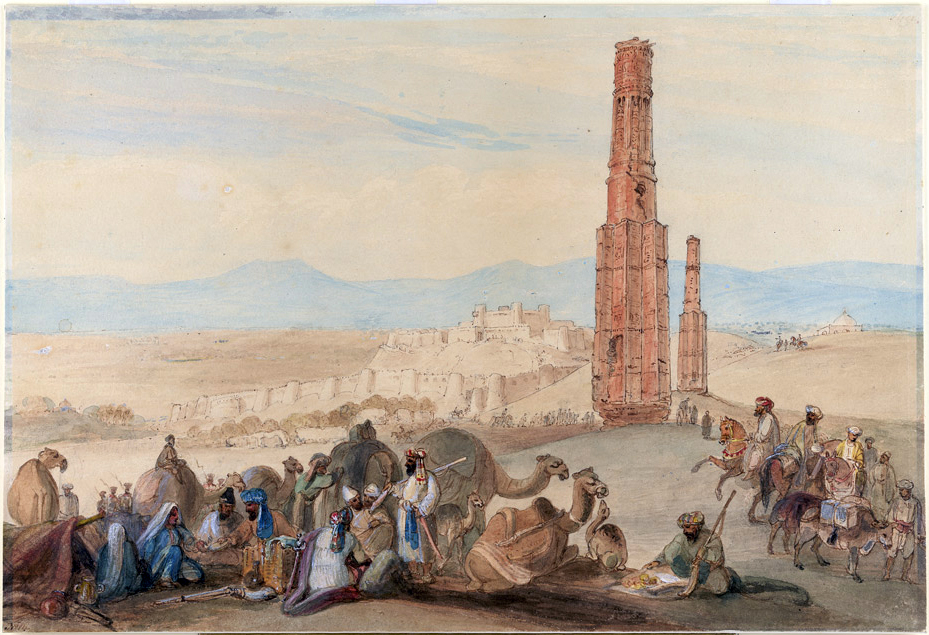
A sketch by Atkinson of the Fortress and Citadel of Ghuznee and two Minars, for his book Sketches in Afghaunistan

Atkinson published his journals of his involvement in the campaign in 1842 in The Expedition into Affghanistan, including a background to the conflict, his own journey across northern India to join the Army and his return, the hardship endured by the Army and its followers through the harsh terrain of Afghanistan beset by Beloochee tribesmen and also of the time he spent in Kabul.

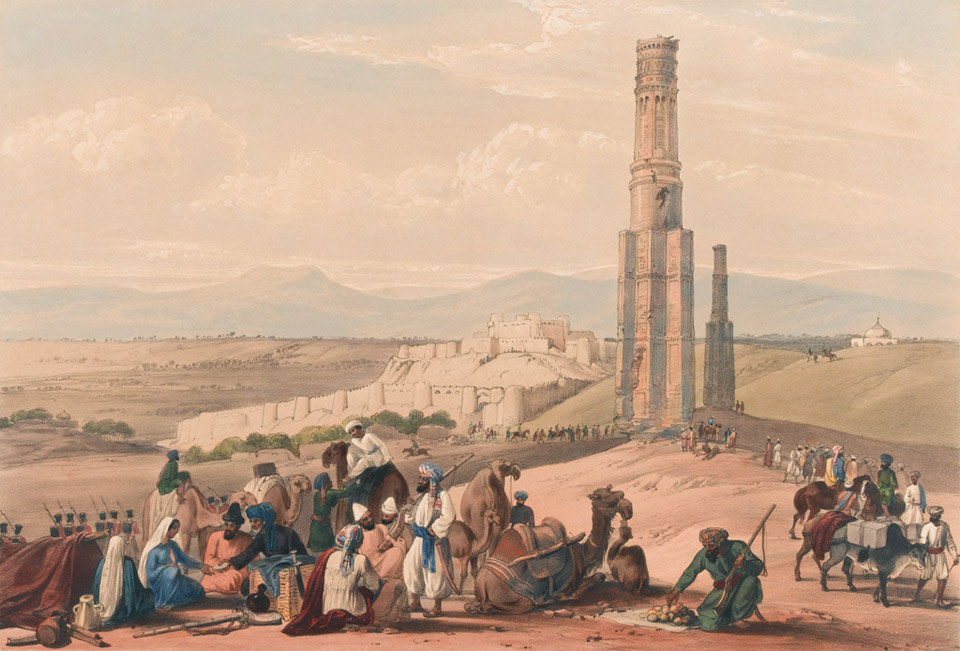
The following published lithograph

He writes of the history of the land, its buildings and people, having met and painted many of the protagonists in the campaign, including both Shah Shoojah-ool-Moolk and Dost Mohammad Khan. He realised the impossibility of controlling a country like Afghanistan in his line "Like Sisyphus, we have rolled up the huge stone to the top of the mountain, and if we do not keep it there, our labour will be lost". The same year Atkinson published Sketches in Afghaunistan, a folio of 25 tinted lithographed plates showing the topography and landscapes of Afghanistan and the Punjab creating an important record of "what was then an unexplored country". Atkinson had planned a second volume but the 'worked up' paintings were lost at sea en route to his British publisher where they were to be engraved; the original sketches he had prepared on the spot however are in the British Library.

== Retirement ==
Atkinson became a member of the Medical Board in Calcutta in 1845 and was made Inspector General of Hospitals (ranking with Brigadier-General), he retired two years later after 45 years in the company's service and returned to England. He died on 7 August 1852 and was interred at Brompton Cemetery, London.

== Marriage ==
Atkinson married Jane Bathie on 4 October 1815 at Fort William, Calcutta. Together they had four sons and one daughter: Frederick Dayot, Charles D’Oyly, George Francklin, Julia and James Augustus.

== Publications ==
- Rodolpho, a poetical romance. London, Edinburgh: J Denovan for R Phillips & W Glendinning, Booksellers. 1801. OCLC 1152636821.
- Soohrab, a poem, from the original Persian of Firdousee, being a portion of the Shahnama of that celebrated poet. London: Smith, Elder & Co. 1814. OCLC 474687892.
- Antiquities of Dacca, with engravings by J Landseer from drawings by Sir C D'Oyly. John Landseer. 1816. (James Atkinson wrote the descriptive text.)
- Hatim Ta'ee, an old romance in the Persian language. Philip Pereira, at the Hindoostanee Press (Calcutta). 1818. OCLC 46460413.
- First Canto of Ricciardetto. Calcutta. 1818. OCLC 644012027.
- The Aubid, an eastern tale. London: Black, Kingsbury, Parbury and Allen. 1819. OCLC 838238141.
- Ricciarda, a tragedy in five acts from the Italian of Ugo Foscolo. Calcutta: W M Thacker & Co. 1823. OCLC 711952959.
- The City of Palaces, a fragment and other poems. Calcutta: Government Gazette Press. 1824. OCLC 55043997.
- Prospectus of The Calcutta Liberal – postscript. Calcutta. 1824. OCLC 643957204.
- La secchia rapita; or, The rape of the bucket an heroic-comical poem in twelve cantos. Translated from the Italian of Alessandro Tassoni, with notes. Cornhill: J M Richardson. 1825. OCLC 1194045224.
- Tom Raw, the Griffin: a Burlesque Poem in Twelve Cantos Illustrated by Twenty-Five Engravings Descriptive of the Adventures of a Cadet in the East India Company's Service, from the Period of His Quitting England to His Obtaining a Staff Situation. London: R Ackermann. 1828. OCLC 75469561. (The drawings were by Sir Charles D'Oyly and the verses by James Atkinson.)
- Description of The New Process of Perforating and Destroying The Stone in The Bladder. London: S Highley. 1831. OCLC 1049045735.
- The Sha Nameh of the Persian Poet Firdausi, translated and abridged in prose and verse with notes and illustrations. Oriental Translation Fund of Great Britain and Ireland. 1832. OCLC 457993937.
- Customs and Manners of the Women of Persia, and their domestic superstitions, translated from the original Persian manuscript (Kitábi Kulsúm Nanch). London: Oriental Translation Fund. 1832. OCLC 251762072.
- The Loves of Laili and Majnun, a poem, from the original Persian of Nazami. London: A J Valpy. 1836. OCLC 645568090.
- Makhzan ul Asrar, the Treasury of Secrets, a Poem; a translation from the poet Nazami. London: Oriental Translation Fund of Great Britain and Ireland. 1836.
- The Expedition into Afghanistan: notes and sketches descriptive of the country, contained in a personal narrative during the campaign of 1839 & 1840, etc. London: W H Allen & Co. 1842. OCLC 682392925.
- Sketches in Afghaunistan. London: H Graves & Co. 1842. OCLC 832235468.
