= Thomas Latta =

British medical innovator (c.1796–1833)

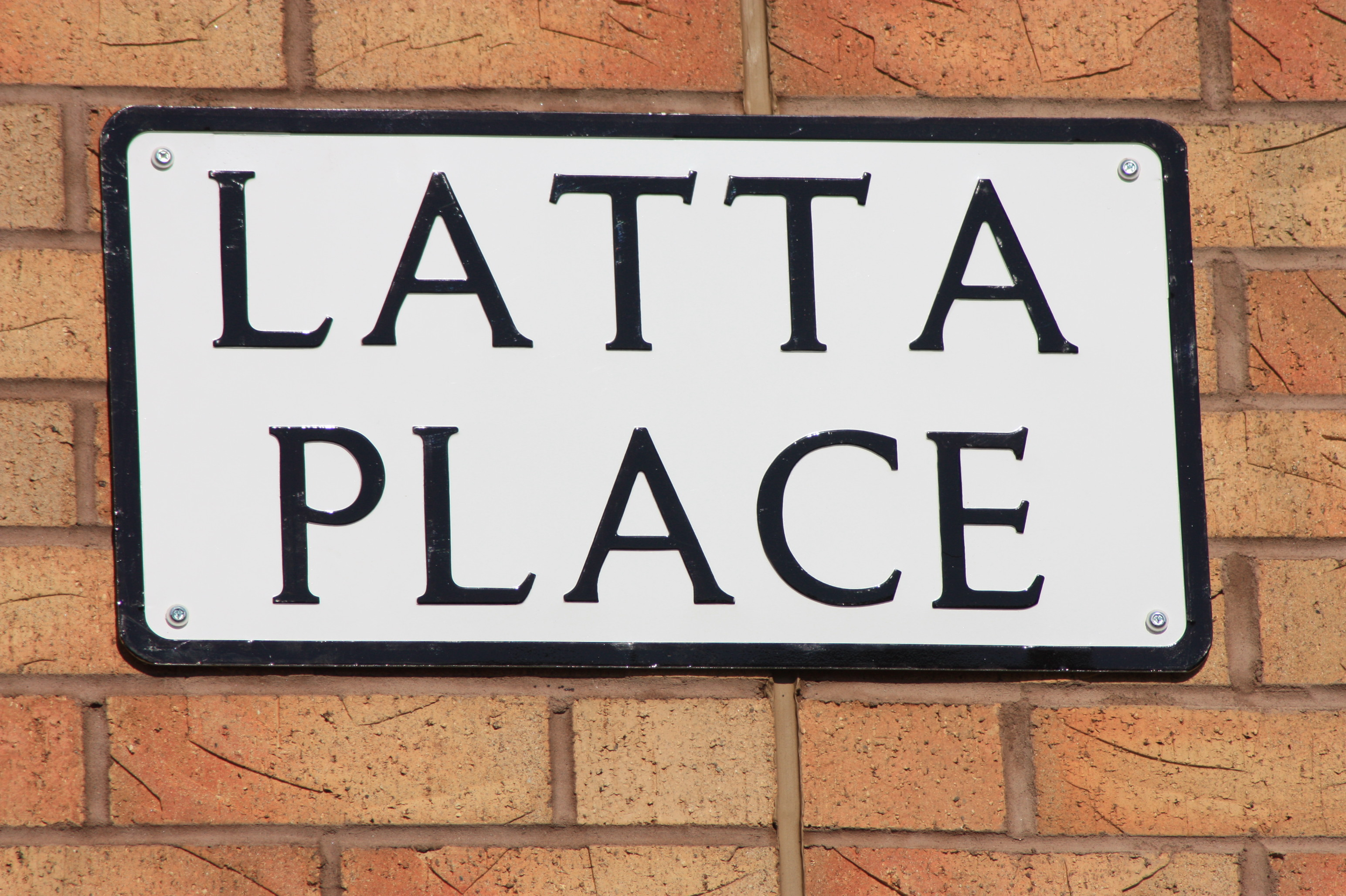
Latta Place in Edinburgh

Thomas Aitchison Latta (c. 1796 – 19 October 1833) was a medical pioneer who was responsible for the introduction of the saline solution ("saline drip") methodology into the treatment of patients.

== Life ==
Thomas Latta was born at Jessfield House, near the fishing village of Newhaven near Edinburgh. His father Alexander Latta acquired the property in 1796. No birth records have been found probably because the Latta family were members of a dissenting congregation The Associate Congregation of Leith, and as such would not feature in the baptism records of established Church. His maternal grandfather is thought to be Rev Thomas Aitchison of Leith.

He attended the University of Edinburgh, graduating MD in 1819 with a thesis about scurvy. Latta set up in medical practice in the port of Leith in 1822. He continued to live at Jessfield, which he inherited from his father Alexander Latta (d.1807), before moving to Leith. During his time in practice in Leith he lived at Bridge Street, Sandport Street, Constitution Street and finally at 15 Charlotte Street.

=== Intravenous infusion of saline ===
Latta introduced the technique of intravenous infusion in 1832 during a cholera epidemic which had reached Britain in the previous year and was responsible for the deaths of large numbers of people. Latta was the leader of a group of three Leith doctors, the other two being Dr Thomas Craigie and Dr Robert Lewins. Whilst all three were based in Leith, Latta's pioneering intravenous treatment was carried out on five patients in the Edinburgh Cholera Hospital on Drummond Street, a building which was the original Old Surgeons' Hall and which had been bought by the Royal Infirmary of Edinburgh. The value of isolating such patients in specialist hospitals had been learned early in the epidemic. Although his technique proved effective in saving human lives, the research appears be have forgotten for 70 years before re-emerging and becoming widely adopted.

Intravenous theory had existed prior to 1832 but had never been successfully put into practice. The critical aspect of Latta's theory was the nature of the liquid, as he correctly speculated that a salt solution could substitute for blood in restoring the circulating blood volume. Basing his experiments on the theories of Dr William Brooke O'Shaughnessy, Latta had observed that cholera victims lost a huge proportion of water content from their blood. Replenishment of this in combination with "oxygenating salts" were seen as key to patient recovery. The theory was then put into practice. Latta had at first administeedr the salt solution rectally, 'I attempted', he wrote 'to restore the blood to its natural state, by injecting copiously into the larger intestines warm water... trusting that the power of absorption might not be altogether lost, but by these means I produced, in no case, any permanent benefit.'

The rectal infusion having failed, on 23 May 1832 Latta wrote to the Central Board of Health notifying them of his intention to begin the treatment intravenously. He used a Read's patent syringe to administer the salt solution. These large metal syringes were normally used to administer enemas or to withdraw ingested poisons from the stomach. He first inserted a metal cannula into the basilica vein in the arm and connected this to the syringe with rubber tubing. The salt solution was strained through "shammy leather" and his first patient had a total of six pints (3.4 litres) was injected over 30 minutes.

His letter described his method and the patient's response:: ' I at length resolved to throw the fluid immediately into the circulation. In this, having no precedent to direct me, I proceeded with much caution. The first subject of experiment was an aged female. She had apparently reached the last moments of her earthly existence, and now nothing could injure her – indeed, so entirely was she reduced, that I feared I should be unable to get my apparatus ready ere she expired. Having inserted a tube into the basilic vein, cautiously – anxiously, I watched the effects; ounce after ounce was injected, but no visible change was produced. Still persevering, I though she began to breathe less laboriously, soon the sharpened features, and sunken eye, and fallen jaw, pale and cold, bearing the manifest impress of death's signet, began to glow with returning animation; the pulse, which had long ceased, returned to the wrist; at first small and quick, by degrees it became more and more distinct ... and in the short space of half an hour, when six pints had been injected, she expressed in a firm voice that she was free from all uneasiness, actually became jocular, and fancied all she needed was a little sleep." Shortly after Latta left her the vomiting and diarrhoea returned and she died some 5 hours later.

The technique was then used on other patients with further success but some failure. The results were published in The Lancet on 23 June 1832 and the methodology began to spread; by then the epidemic was on the wane.

This extract from The Lancet graphically illustrates the effects of successful treatment: "The very remarkable effects of this remedy require to be witnessed to be believed. Shortly after the commencement of the injection the pulse, which was not perceptible, gradually returns; the eyes, which were sunk and turned upwards, are suddenly brought forward, and the patient looks round as if in health, the natural heat of the body is gradually restored, the tongue and breath, which were in some cases at the temperature of 79° and 80°, rise to 88° and 90°, and soon become natural, the laborious respiration and oppression of weight of the chest are relieved ... the whole countenance assumes a natural healthy appearance".

Results were inconsistent, almost certainly because the correct proportions of salt for physiological saline were then unknown, leaving Latta unable to gauge the proportions of potassium, sodium, bicarbonate, and chloride in the blood so as to prevent hemolysis and the destruction of red blood cells. Though a few of Latta's patients appear to have survived, most died after a temporary period of excitation like that described in his letter to the Lancet. The standard use of saline solutions (largely for recovery procedures) did not begin until 1902, when electrolyte balance and the mechanisms of hypovolemic shock were better understood.

== Personal ==
In November, 1825 Latta married Mary Millar, the daughter of a Canongate builder. They had four sons together: Thomas Allison Latta (1826-38), John Millar Latta (1828), Walter Buchanan Latta (1830-51), and Peter Anderson Latta (1833-40). His son Walter died in London in 1851 from tuberculosis and was buried in the graveyard of South Leith Parish Church.

Latta was based at the Leith Dispensary and Humane Society at 17 Broad Wynd, the forerunners of Leith Hospital. Having suffered from tuberculosis for several years, he died in 1833. His death certificate was signed by Dr James Scarth Combe. His wife Mary died in 1873 and was buried near her son Walter. In her will she expressed a wish to be buried next to her husband and children, so it is likely Dr Thomas Latta is also buried there.

Thomas Latta also contributed publications on the subject of Arctic science, after having sailed as "surgeon and companion" with Captain William Scoresby on a whaling expedition, while still a medical student.

== Memorials ==
In 2014, a new street, on the site of the Eastern General Hospital, was named Latta Place in his memory.
