= William Brooke O'Shaughnessy =

Irish physician (1809–1889)

Sir William Brooke O'Shaughnessy FRS
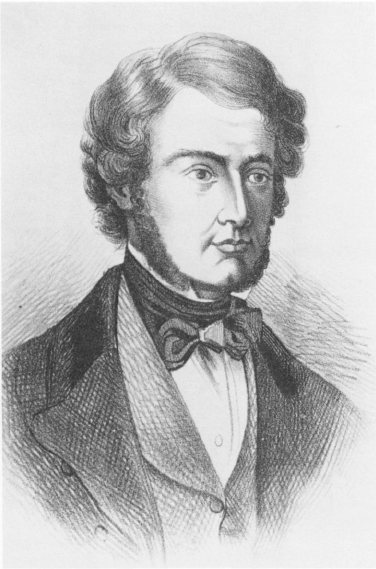
- Born: October 1809; Limerick, Ireland
- Died: 8 January 1889 (aged 79); Southsea, Hampshire, England
- Education: University of Edinburgh (MD)
- Known for: Saline; Medical cannabis
- Awards: FRS (1843); Knighthood (1856)
- Medical career
- Field: Medicine
- Institutions: Medical College, Bengal; Medical and Physical Society of Calcutta

Sir William Brooke O'Shaughnessy (from 1861 as William O'Shaughnessy Brooke) FRS (October 1809 – 8 January 1889) was an Irish physician famous for his wide-ranging scientific work in pharmacology, chemistry, and inventions related to telegraphy and its use in India. His medical research led to the development of intravenous therapy and introduced the therapeutic use of medical cannabis to Western medicine.

== Early life ==
O'Shaughnessy was born in Limerick in 1809 to Daniel O'Shaughnessy and Sarah Boswell. His mother was a Protestant and many in the family were clergymen. An uncle of his was the Dean of Ennis and a great uncle the Roman Catholic Bishop of Killaloe. William studied briefly at Trinity College, Dublin matriculating in 1825 but moved to Scotland before graduating. O'Shaughnessy studied forensic toxicology and chemistry in Scotland, and graduated in 1829 with an MD from the University of Edinburgh Medical School. In 1829 he was a clinical assistant of William Alison. In 1831, at the age of 22, as a result of his analysis of the blood of cholera victims, O'Shaughnessy laid the foundation, along with Thomas Aitchison Latta, for what was to become intravenous fluid and electrolyte-replacement therapy in the treatment of cholera. O'Shaughnessy analyzed the urine and blood of cholera patients and came to the conclusion that oxygen in the blood could reverse the actions. He found the blood deficient in water, salt, and "free alkali" and suggested that injecting salts would help. The method was tried by O'Shaughnessy on a dog and developed further by Latta.

O'Shaughnessy failed to obtain a position Professor of Medical Jurisprudence in the University of London and his marriage forced him to join the service of the British East India Company on 8 August 1833 and he moved to Calcutta, remaining in India and serving initially at Gyah and Cuttack before joining the 72nd Bengal Native Infantry. He joined the 10th Regiment Bengal Light Cavalry in 1835 and was an assistant to the Opium Agent in Bihar till 5 August 1835 when he became Professor of the medical college in Calcutta. He served on the committee of the Materia Medica until 1840 and later was Chemical Examiner to the government. As chemical examiner he developed methods for forensic studies for detecting arsenic poisoning as well as botanical toxins (such as from Plumbago used as an abortifacient). He went on furlough to England in 1841 to 1844 and returned to join as Chemical Examiner and additionally as Deputy Assay Master of the Calcutta Mint.

== Work in India ==
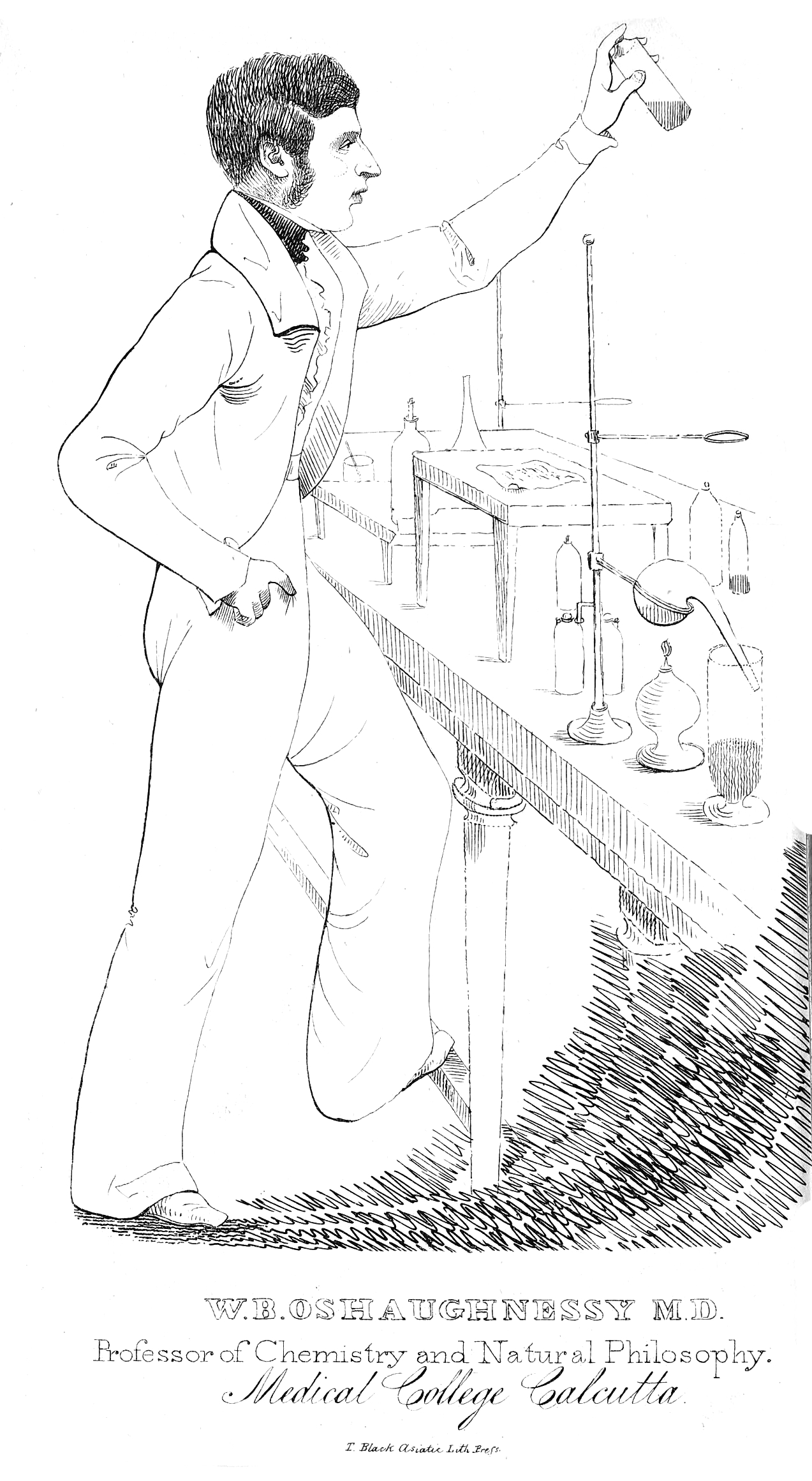
Portrait by Colesworthey Grant

His first stint in India was marked by work in the subjects of botanical pharmacology, chemistry, galvanic electricity, and underwater conduction, among others. He worked on modifications to the Daniell cell and the use of tanned leather semi-permeable membranes in them. He identified the use of zinc to reduce the rusting of iron before the process of galvanizing had been established. O'Shaughnessy also analyzed the gun-cotton developed by Christian Friedrich Schönbein and recognized the role of nitrogen and correctly identified the role of sulphuric acid in removing water from the cotton. He also developed a silver chloride electrode and experimented on adding colour tones to the Daguerre photographic process. At Calcutta, he was a member of the Medical and Physical Society of Calcutta, where he published one of his first papers on medical applications of cannabis. He validated folk uses of cannabis in India, discovered new applications, and ultimately recommended cannabis for a great variety of therapeutic purposes. O'Shaughnessy established his reputation by successfully relieving the pain of rheumatism and stilling the convulsions of an infant with cannabis. He eventually popularized its use back in England. His most famous success came when he quelled the wrenching muscle spasm of tetanus and rabies with resin. While he could not cure tetanus, he observed that the cannabis mixture reduced their symptoms of spasticity and their suffering. In 1837 he published his independent design of an electric motor. In 1839, O'Shaughnessy conducted experiments on an experimental telegraphy system that he set up in the Botanical Garden at Calcutta with the assistance of Nathaniel Wallich. A length of 22 miles of wire was laid by zigzagging them over bamboo posts. In 1841, he returned to England, where he introduced Cannabis indica to Western medicine and continued his scientific writings. He was a member of the London Electrical Society and was elected a fellow of the Royal Society on 16 March 1843. The Candidature for Election to Fellow of the Royal Society stated that he was "distinguished for his acquaintance with the science of Medicine and Chemistry, eminent as a Physician and as a promoter of education among the natives of Bengal". O'Shaughnessy was a supporter of the idea of education in native languages in medicine. He also wanted locally available sources of medicine to be utilized to provide inexpensive aid. As a teacher, he took students on field trips to the Botanical Garden to introduce them to the local medicinal plants. In 1837 he prepared a Manual of Chemistry of which a thousand copies were printed for use in Calcutta. A second edition was produced in 1842. Another major book was the Bengal Dispensatory and Pharmacopeia which included an appendix on the "improvement of Bengal pottery" (1840) since earthenware imports from Europe were proving to be expensive. The Bengal Dispensatory included descriptions of several plant species that were made or overseen by Wallich including those of Abelmoschus longifolius, Pharbitis caerulea, Hebradendron pictorium and Garcinia pictoria. These descriptions have often been overlooked by botanists in the past.

== Return to India ==
In 1844, O'Shaughnessy returned to India, where he worked in various government positions in the fields of pharmacology and assay. Lord Dalhousie became interested in the establishment of a telegraphic network and he learnt of the work of O'Shaugnessy and found that he could work on the scheme. Dalhousie informed the Military Board that O'Shaugnessy was to work directly under Dalhousie's supervision and report directly without any other intermediary authorities. During this period he began work on various telegraph instruments and systems. After briefly returning to England in 1852, O'Shaughnessy was appointed Superintendent of Telegraphs in 1852. During the years 1853-5 3500 miles of telegraph were installed across India and he wrote numerous manuals and reports on his telegraph inventions. O'Shaughnessy was on leave in England during the mutiny year but in the same year Morse code was introduced into India and a message from Delhi to Punjab helped in moving troops in time. In 1858 a cable was laid in the Gulf of Mannar between India and Ceylon. O'Shaughnessy introduced a coil of fine wire in the circuit to protect the cables from lightning. His successor in the telegraphs department, Charles Adley, became a fierce critic of O'Shaughnessy's work.

== Knighthood and return to England ==
In 1856 he was knighted by Queen Victoria for his work on the telegraph in India. He was appointed Director-General of Telegraphs at this time. During the following years O'Shaughnessy wrote on telegraphy-related subjects, including a book of private codes for encrypted telegraphy. In 1860, O'Shaughnessy returned to Europe for sick leave where he remained in obscurity until his death from senile asthenia at Southsea on 8 January 1889. He was buried at Highland Road Cemetery, Portsmouth.

He adopted the surname Brooke by Royal Licence in 1861 on the death of a relative. He was married three times. His second wife was the daughter of Francis O'Shaughnessy and his third was Julia Greenly, daughter of Captain Sabine.
