= Mary Latta =

- Born: October 30, 1803; Edinburgh
- Died: July 21, 1873; Edinburgh
- Occupation: Writer
- Spouse: Thomas Latta

Mary Latta (October 30, 1803 – July 21, 1873) was a Scottish novelist.

Mary Latta was born on October 30, 1803 in Edinburgh, the daughter of John Miller, a Canongate builder, and Joanna Hepburn Miller. In November 1825, she married Dr. Thomas Aitchison Latta, who became famous for introducing the saline drip to treat patients during an 1831-32 cholera outbreak. They would have four sons, three of whom died in childhood, and Dr. Latta himself died in 1833.

She commemorated her children in her 1840s book The Pious Brothers: A tribute to the memory of three beloved children. She published a novel, The Orphans of Glenulva (1862). The title page of that book credits her with another work, The Everlasting Kingdom.

Mary Latta died of breast cancer on 21 July 1873 in Edinburgh.

== Bibliography ==
- The pious brothers : a tribute to the memory of three beloved children. Third edition. Edinburgh: William Oliphant and Sons, 1845.
- The Orphans of Glenulva: A Story of Scottish Life. 1 vol. Edinburgh: William Oliphant and Son, 1862.
