= Ramkamal Sen =

Bengali scholar

- রামকমল সেন
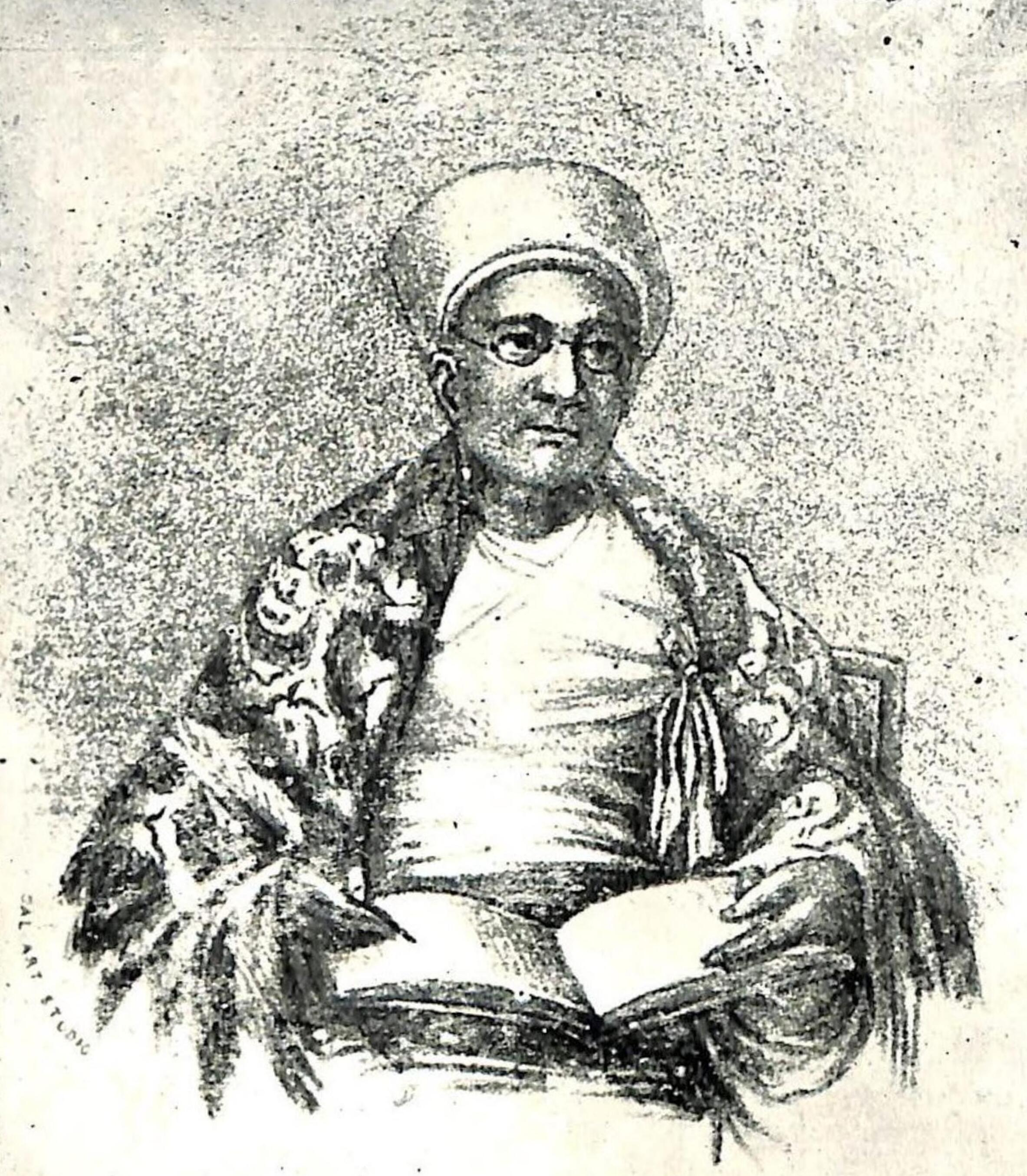
- Born: 15 March 1783; Garifa Village, Hooghly, Bengal, British India (today Naihati, West Bengal, India)
- Died: 2 August 1844 (aged 61); Calcutta, Bengal, British India (today Kolkata, West Bengal, India)
- Occupations: Scholar, Writer, Lexicographer
- Notable work: Nitikatha (1818); Ausadhsar Sangraha (1819); Hitopadesh (1820)
- Spouse: Chandramani Debi
- Father: Gokul Bihari Sen

Ramkamal Sen (1783–1844) was a Bengali scholar, writer, and lexicographer in the 18th century. He was known as the Diwan of the Treasury, Treasurer of the Bank of Bengal and Secretary of the Asiatic Society, Calcutta.

== Childhood ==
Born at Garifa, Naihati town in North 24 pargana district. on the banks of the Hooghly River in a Baidya family, he proceeded to Kolkata in 1791 for his education. His father was Gokul Bihari Sen and his wife was Chandramani Debi.

His grandson was the pre-eminent social reformer and founder of the Nababidhan Brahmo Samaj, Keshab Chandra Sen"

== Career ==
A self-made man, starting as a petty compositor earning eight rupees a month, "He worked for several years in a Hindustani press after which he was appointed as a clerk in the Asiatic Society". Shibnath Shastri writes, "by dint of his capabilities, hard work and diligence, he rose to be its indigenous secretary. He was subsequently nominated a member of its committee."

In 1812, he secured a job in Fort William College. Finally, he rose to be a Dewani of the Treasury, and treasurer of the Bengal Bank.

== Social works ==
He was connected with many of the social activities of his time. When Hindu College was established in 1817, he was a member of its committee. After a failed first attempt to remove Derozio from the school for preaching Christianity, he also became principal of the newly established Sanskrit College for sometime.

Sastri wrote: "Babu Ramkamal Sen acting as their mouthpeice, ... called a Committee meeting, and moved that Mr Derozios's manners and conduct was such as to injure the morals of the boys in touch with him and he should be removed from the staff of masters."

He was a member of the Medical Commission set up by Lord William Bentinck.

Ramkamal Sen was well known as being a staunch pro-sati activist and lifelong opponent of Ram Mohan Roy. He publicly opposed (with Radhakanta Deb) Roy's agitation against sati (the practice of forcing Hindu widows to be burnt on their husbands funeral pyre). He was also President of the Gaudiya Sabha, (a prominent association of Bengali Hindu ultra-conservatives).

Along with Radhakanta Deb, he was appointed as an Indian member of the "Tea Committee" in 1834. In the same year he published an English-Bengalee dictionary in 2 volumes with 58,000 words which was commissioned by the Serampore Baptist Mission (1817–1834). Another famous book that he co-authored was Hitopadesha in 1820, a collection of fables modelled on Aesop's.
