= Sanskrit College and University =

University in West Bengal, India

The Sanskrit College and University
- Former name: Sanskrit College (1824–2015)
- Motto in English: Keeping to the root, reaching for the future.
- Type: Public university
- Established: c. 1824; 202 years ago
- Affiliations: UGC
- Budget: ₹0.6918 crore (US$72,000) (2021–22 est.)
- Chancellor: Governor of West Bengal
- Vice-Chancellor: Ayan Bhattacharjee
- Location: Kolkata, West Bengal, India; 22°34′33″N 88°21′51″E
- Campus: Kolkata (College Street) and Nabadwip
- Website: sanskritcollegeanduniversity.ac.in

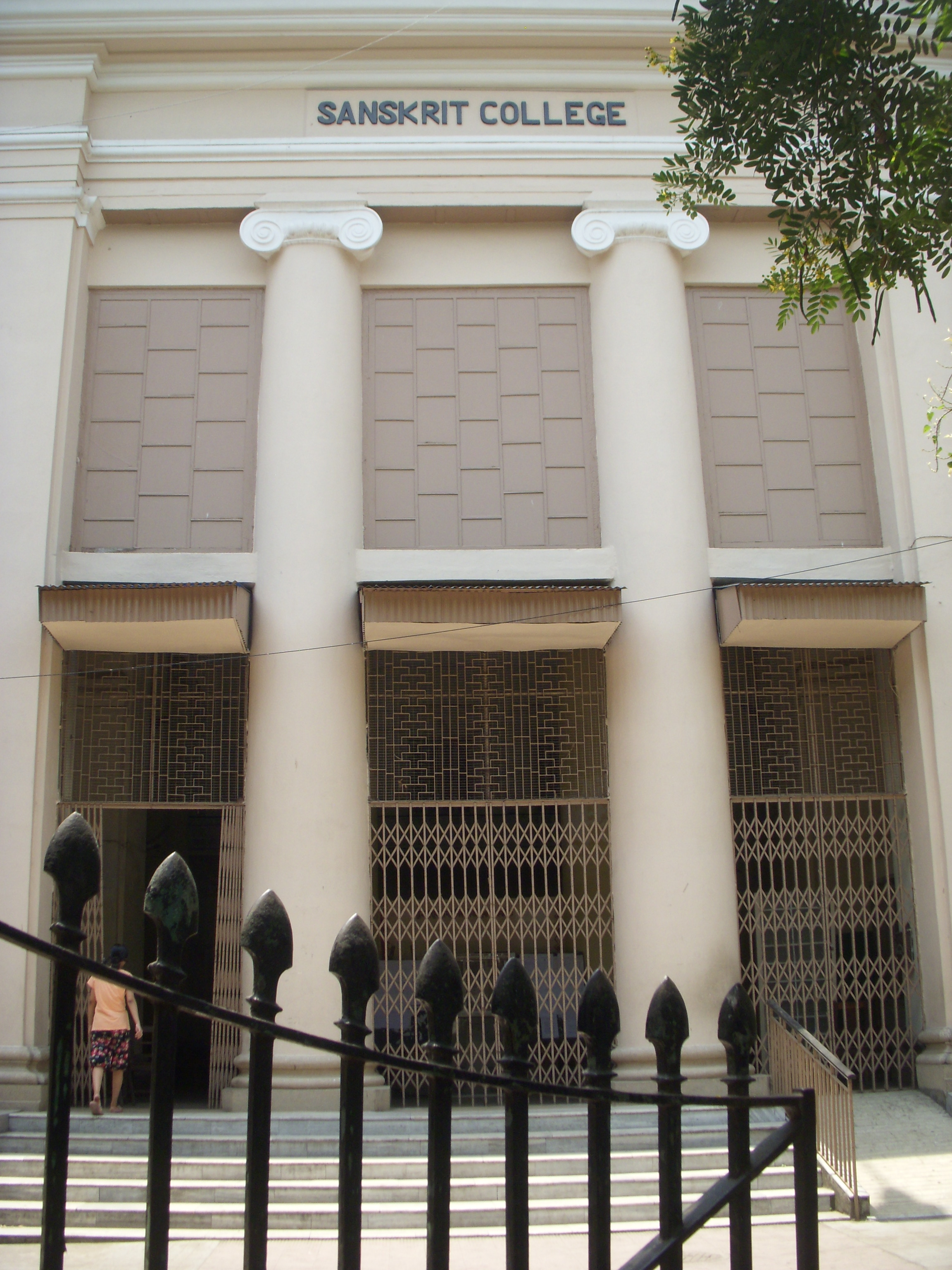
Entrance to the main building

Sanskrit College and University (erstwhile Sanskrit College) is a state university located in Kolkata, West Bengal, India. It focuses on liberal arts, offering both undergraduate and postgraduate degrees in Ancient Indian and world history, Bengali, English, Sanskrit, Philosophy, Linguistics, and traditional oriental learning (Advaitya Vedanta) and Pali.

== History ==
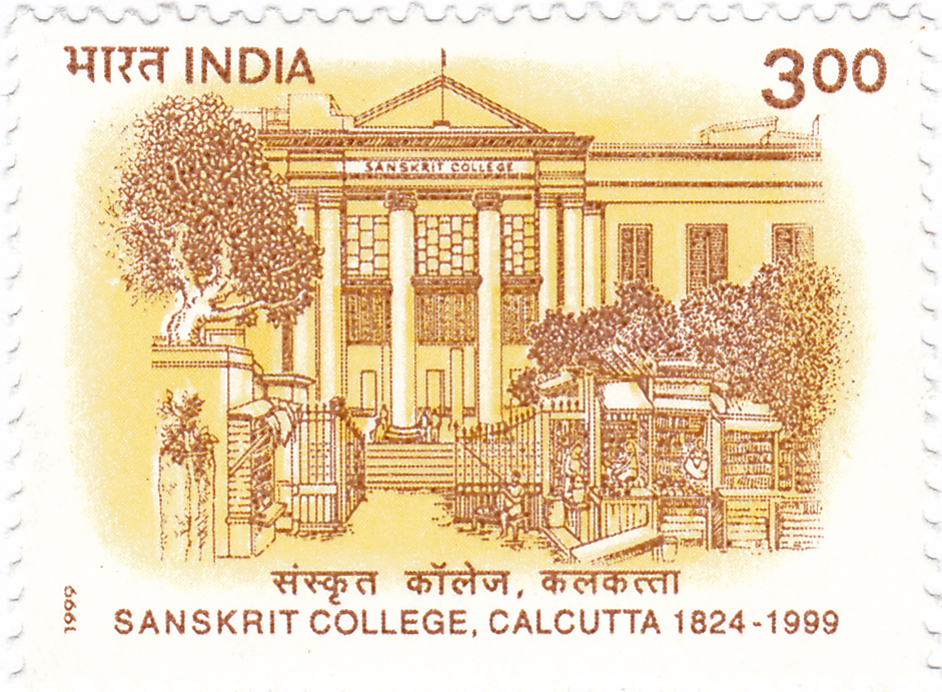
A 1999 stamp dedicated to the 175th anniversary of the Sanskrit College

Sanskrit College was founded on 1 January 1824, during the Governor-Generalship of Lord Amherst, based on a recommendation by James Prinsep and Thomas Babington Macaulay among others.

Secretaries
- 1824–1832: W. A. Price
- 1832: Horace Hayman Wilson (offg)
- 1832–1833: Leftt. Todd
- 1833: Horace Hayman Wilson (offg)
- 1832–1839: A. Troyer
- 1835–1839: Ramkamal Sen
- 1836–1837: Radhakanta Dev (interim)
- ?: J. C. C. Sutherland (3 months)
- 1840–1841: T. A. Wise
- 1841–1851: Rasamoy Dutt
Principals
- 1851–1858: Ishwar Chandra Vidyasagar
- 1858–1864: Edward Byles Cowell
- 1864–1876: Prasanna Kumar Sarbadhikary
- 1876–1895: Mahesh Chandra Nyayratna Bhattacharyya
- 1895–1900: Nilmani Mukhopadhyaya
- 1900–1908: Haraprasad Shastri
- 1908–1910: Kaliprasanna Vidyaratna
- 1910–1920: Satish Chandra Vidyabhusan
- 1920–1923: Ashutosh Shastri
- 1924–1931: Aditya Nath Mukhopadhyay
- 1931–1942: Surendranath Dasgupta
- 1944–1946: Anantaprasad Banerjee Shastri
- 1947–1948: Jatindra Bimal Chaudhury
- 1948–1954: Sadananda Bhaduri
- 1954–1957: Prabodh Chandra Lahiri
- 1957–1967: Gaurinath Shastri
- 1967–1968: Kalicharan Shastri
- 1968–1969: Tarashankar Bhattacharya
- 1969–1983: Bishnupada Bhattacharya
- 1983: Munishwar Jha
- 1983–1985: Herambanath Chatterjee Shastri
- 1990–1994: Dilip Kumar Kanjilal
- 1997–1999: Sukomal Choudhury
- 1999–2000: Manjula Mitra
- 2000-2000: Pradip Kumar Majumdar
- 2007–2012: Anadi Kumar Kundu
- 2012–2016: Sanjukta Das
Vice Chancellors
- 2016–2017: Dilip Kumar Mohanto
- 2017–2019: Paula Banerjee
- 2019–2023: Soma Bandhopadhyay
- 2023–2026: Raj Kumar Kothari
- 2026–present: Ayan Bhattacharjee

Mahesh Chandra Nyayratna Bhattacharyya, the scholar of Sanskrit, was the principal of the college for over 18 years. He was made a Companion of the Most Eminent Order of the Indian Empire (C.I.E.), and a member of the Most Eminent Order of the Indian Empire.

He played a crucial role in colonial Bengal's educational reformation. He revived the tol system in Sanskrit education, and introduced titles or "Upadhi".

The institution rose to prominence during the principalship of Ishwar Chandra Vidyasagar in 1851, who admitted students from other than the Brahmin and Baidya caste. In particular, the tol or traditional Indian training school model was incorporated as a department in the 1870s.

From 1824 until 1851 the college did not have the post of principal but was headed by a secretary. From 1851 the college was headed by a principal.

=== Transformation into a university ===
The Sanskrit College and University, West Bengal Bill 2015, aimed at transforming Sanskrit College into a university was passed in West Bengal Assembly on 17 December 2015. The university was established vide The Sanskrit College and University, West Bengal Act 2015 on 19 February 2016 and became functional on 15 June 2016 when the first vice-chancellor, Dilip Kumar Mohanto, joined the institute.

== Campus ==
The Sanskrit College and University is located on College Street in central Kolkata, India. Its centrality is heightened by its proximity to Hindu School, Medical College Kolkata, Presidency University, University of Calcutta, and the Indian Coffee House. It has also an academic and research campus at Nabadwip.

== Organization and Administration ==
=== Governance ===
The Governor of West Bengal is the chancellor of the Sanskrit College and University. The Vice-chancellor of the Sanskrit College and University is the chief executive officer of the university. Ayan Bhattacharjee is the current Vice-chancellor of the university.

=== Departments ===
Sanskrit College and University consist of the departments of Ancient Indian & World History, Bengali, English, Linguistics, Philosophy, Pali, Sanskrit, and Traditional Orientation Learning(Advaita Vedanta, Panini Vyakarana, and Sahitya).

== Academics ==
=== Courses ===
Sanskrit College and University offer different undergraduate and postgraduate courses:

- Four year Undergraduate Degree (B.A. Honours/Research ) courses: English, Ancient Indian & World History(AIWH ), Bengali, Linguistics, Philosophy, Pali, Sanskrit, Advaita Vedanta, Panini Vyakarana, and Sahitya.
- Two-year Postgraduate Degree (M.A.) Courses: Ancient Indian & World History(AIWH ), Bengali, English, Philosophy, Sanskrit, Pali and Linguistics.
- Two-year Acharya degree (equivalent to M.A.) in Traditional Oriental Learning (Advaita Vedanta).(TOL ).
- PhD degrees are also offered.
- They have well-established English, Bengali, Sanskrit, Linguistics and Pali departments. Moreover, the English department is the renowned one which has many excellent faculties.

=== Central Library ===
The central library of the Sanskrit College and University is infatuating for many researchers. It contains over 2,000,000 books and 25,000 manuscripts, including many that are rare. This had led the university to start a digitization program, in order to include these manuscripts in the cultural commons.

== Sanskrit Charcha Kendra, Nabadwip Campus ==
The Sanskrit College and University has established a Sanskrit Charcha Kendra, in Nabadwip, Nadia, West Bengal. This state-of-the-art research center provides an opportunity to research scholars, and academics to harvest the traditional Indic knowledge base already present in University's repository and to take Indological and Sanskrit studies to the future.

- Sanskrit College and University offer Postgraduate Courses (like MA Bengali and Sanskrit ) at Nabadwip Campus.

== Notable alumni ==
- Saradaranjan Ray
- Bijoy Krishna Goswami
- Surendranath Dasgupta
- Krishna Kanta Handique
- Mahanambrata Brahmachari
- Bimal Krishna Matilal
- Abanindranath Tagore
- Ishwar Chandra Vidyasagar
- Madanmohan Tarkalankar

== See also ==
- List of Sanskrit universities in India
- Sanskrit revival
- Education in India
- Education in West Bengal
