= Medical and Physical Society of Calcutta =

Society of British officials

- Abbreviation: MPSC
- Formation: 1823; 203 years ago
- Headquarters: Calcutta

The Medical and Physical Society of Calcutta was a society of British officials, mostly physicians, formed on March 1, 1823. The society published a quarterly journal and met at the Asiatic Society. The journal published articles on diseases prevailing in India and their links with environment and sanitation. Prominent members included Sir James Ranald Martin who was instrumental in publishing medico-topographical reports of British India and establishing links between environment and health, and deforestation and William Brooke O'Shaughnessy, who published one of the first medical uses of marijuana in the journal of the society. There are few records of the journal after 1857.

The society was also referred to as Medical and Physical Society of Bengal and Calcutta Medical and Physical Society.

== Notable members ==
- James Atkinson
- Henry John Carter
- James Ranald Martin
- William Brooke O'Shaughnessy
- Horace Hayman Wilson
