= James Ranald Martin =

British military surgeon

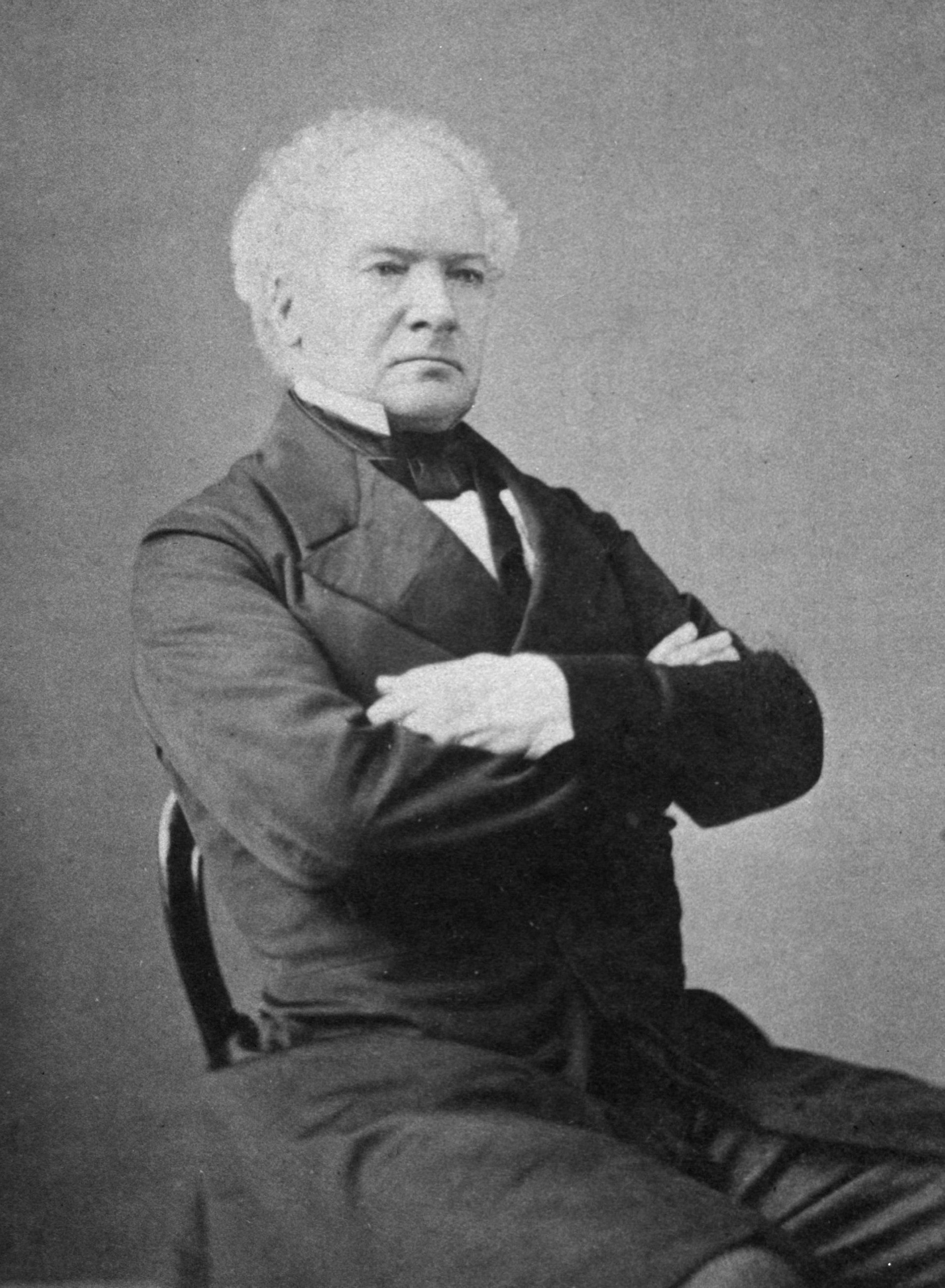
James Ranald Martin

Sir James Ranald Martin (12 May 1796 – 27 November 1874) was a British military surgeon in Colonial India who worked in the service of the Honourable East India Company and was instrumental in publicising the effects of deforestation, and finding links between human and environmental health.

== Early life ==
Born in the Isle of Skye in one of the oldest families living on the island, his father was Rev. Donald Martin and his mother was the daughter of Norman Macdonald and sister of Lieut-Gn. Sir John Macdonald. Martin was educated at St George's and Windmill Street School. He became a C.C.S. in 1811 and entered the Bengal Medical Service on 5 September 1817. He obtained commission of assistant-surgeon through the interest of his uncle, Sir John MacDonald, the Adjutant-General to the Forces.

== Work ==
He reached India at the port of Calcutta in June 1817 by ship, the Lord Hungerford, and reported for duty with the Bengal service on 2 December 1817.

In 1818 he served the British Army's 17th (Leicestershire) and 59th (2nd Nottinghamshire) regiments of foot, which formed the garrison of Fort William in Calcutta. Here he came to see the effect of cholera. He was then sent to Orissa where a malignant fever had prevailed and destroyed more than half the inhabitants of Ganjam. He saw action in a number of military engagements during the 1820s. The most notable of these was the First Burmese War from 1823 to 1826. His war experiences, especially the fact that diseases affected the natives and the Europeans differently, led him to believe that mapping of the medical features of the empire in much the same way as topography was critical for military and economic development. His notes on the medical topography of Calcutta pioneered a genre of works that explored linkages between climate, public health and development. He was made the President of the East India Company's medical board in 1843. In 1856, he substantially re-wrote and extended the then well-known treatise on diseases in the tropics, Influence of Tropical Climates originally authored by James Johnson. He was also appointed as a member of the Sanitary Commission and contributed to the report of the Commission published in 1863.

Smallpox vaccinations had been started in India around 1803, well before his arrival but Martin was the first major advocate of preventive medicine. He proposed in 1835 that Company medical officers should collect statistics of places so that they could be collated for study. His pioneering report on the need for public health measures and the universal provision of clean water in Calcutta in 1836 called for a whole series of medico-topographical reports on India by the medical service. During the Burma War, a number of his colleagues in the Medical Department of the Bengal Army wrote topographies of Rakhine State, and in the following years other Company surgeons began to follow suit, producing detailed medical surveys of their town or district. The Medical and Physical Society of Calcutta, of which Martin was a prominent member, and its counterparts in other presidencies, encouraged the publication of such reports in their transactions. Many of these reports spoke about the rapid rates of deforestation since the early 1820s. Such reports were instrumental in institutionalization of forest conservation activities in British India through the establishment of Forest Departments and the Indian Forest Service.

== Sources ==
- Grove, R. H. (1997) Ecology, Climate and Empire The White House Press, UK, pp. 237
- Sir Joseph Fayrer, Life of the Inspector General Sir James Ranald Martin (London, 1897) D.N.B., 12, pp. I 165–6.
