= George Francklin Atkinson =

- Born: 1822
- Died: 1859 (aged 36–37)
- Parent(s): James Atkinson

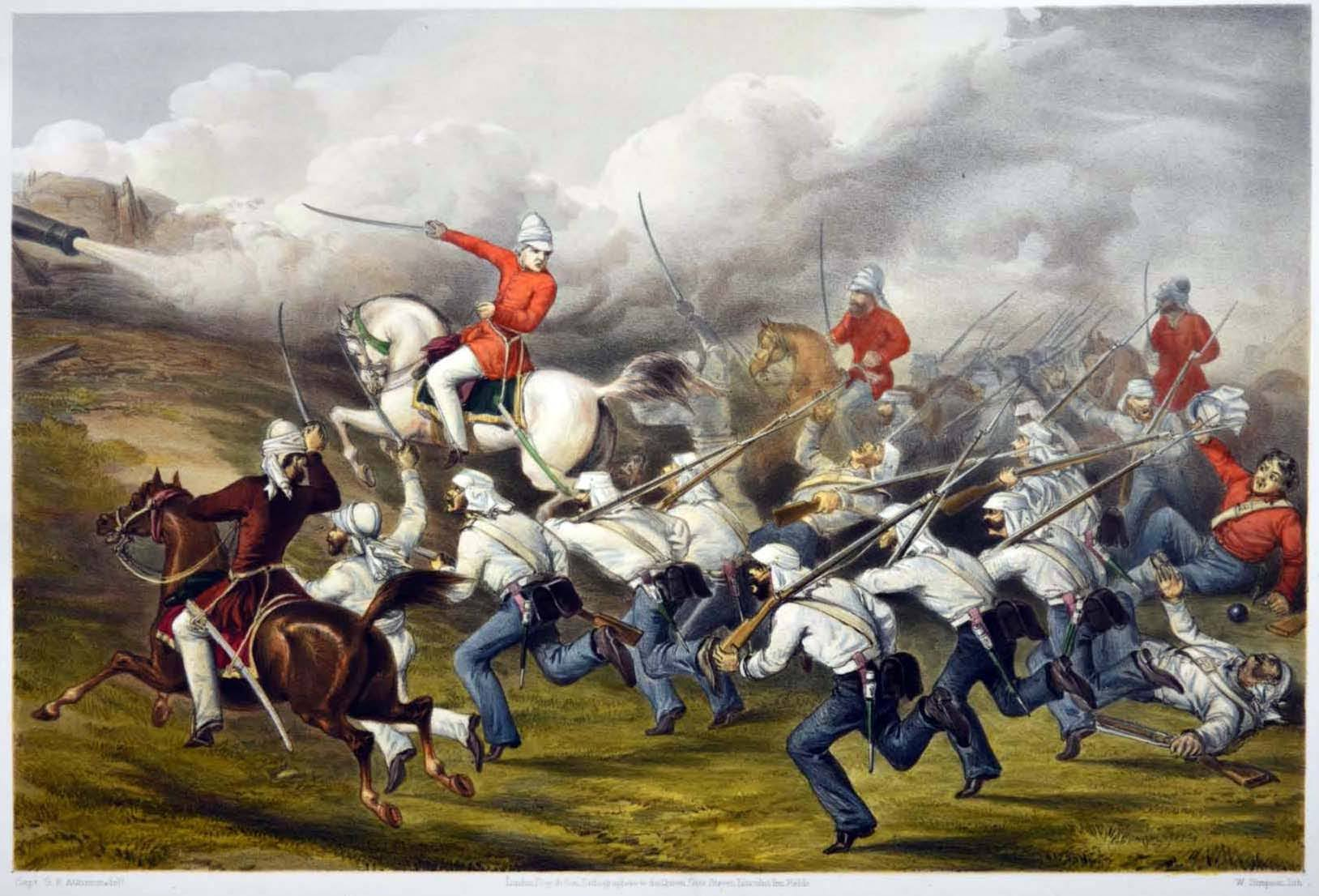
Storming the Batteries at Badle-Serai, depicting the Sepoy Rebellion of 1857

George Francklin Atkinson (1822–1859), was a British artist and writer and an officer of the Bengal Engineers. His paintings depicted colonial life and military battles, mainly in India.

He was the son of James Atkinson who was also an artist, as well as a surgeon and a Persian scholar. Atkinson served with the Bengal Engineers between 1840 and 1859, and witnessed the Sepoy Rebellion of 1857.
