= H. H. Wilson =

British Indologist (1786–1860)

Horace Hayman Wilson
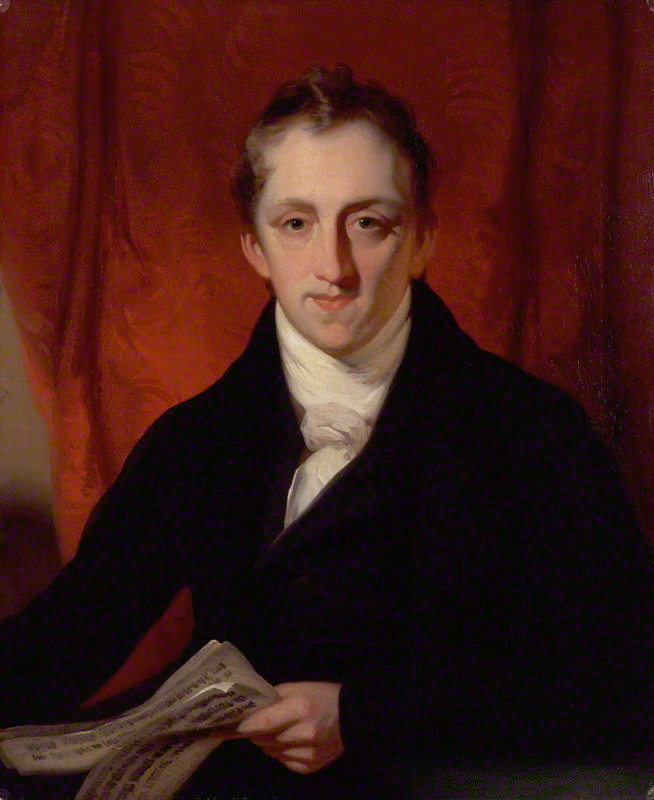
- Born: 26 September 1786; London, Great Britain (present-day London, UK)
- Died: 8 May 1860 (aged 73); London, Great Britain
- Resting place: Kensal Green Cemetery
- Other names: H. H. Wilson
- Occupations: Translator; Writer; Professor; Lexicographer; Numismatist
- Notable work: 𝄪Translations of: ·Meghduta (1813) ·Vishnu Purana (1840) 𝄪Books: ·Sanskrit English Dictionary (1819) ·Theatre of the Hindus (1820) ·Lectures on the Religious and Philosophical (1840) ·Systems of the Hindus (1840) ·Ariana Antiqua (1841) ·A Historical Account of the Burmese War (1852)
- Spouse: Frances Sarah Parr Siddons (m. 1829)
- Children: 7

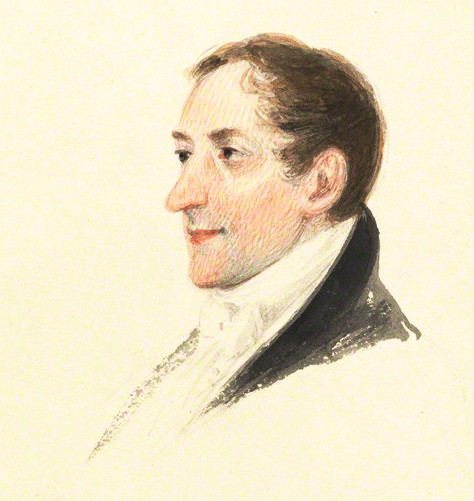
Watercolour by James Atkinson, 1821

Horace Hayman Wilson (26 September 1786 – 8 May 1860) was an English orientalist who was elected the first Boden Professor of Sanskrit at Oxford University.

== Life ==
He studied medicine at St Thomas's Hospital, and went out to India in 1808 as assistant-surgeon on the Bengal establishment of the British East India Company. His knowledge of metallurgy caused him to be attached to the mint at Calcutta, where he was for a time associated with John Leyden.

He acted for many years as secretary to the committee of public instruction, and superintended the studies of the Sanskrit College in Calcutta. He was one of the staunchest opponents of the proposal that English should be made the sole medium of instruction in native schools, and became for a time the object of bitter attacks.

In 1832 Oxford University selected Wilson to be the first occupant of the newly founded Boden chair of Sanskrit: he had placed a column length advertisement in The Times on 6 March 1832 p. 3, giving a list of his achievements and intended activities, along with testimonials, including one from a rival candidate, as to his suitability for the post. In 1836 he was appointed librarian to the East India Company. He also taught at the East India Company College. On 10 April 1834 he was elected as a Fellow of the Royal Society of London.

On the recommendation of Henry Thomas Colebrooke, Wilson was in 1811 appointed secretary to the Asiatic Society of Bengal. He was a member of the Medical and Physical Society of Calcutta and was an original member of the Royal Asiatic Society, of which he was director from 1837 up to the time of his death.

He married Frances Siddons, a grand-daughter of the famous actress Sarah Siddons through her son George.

Wilson died on 8 May 1860 and is buried in Kensal Green Cemetery.

== Works ==
Wilson became deeply interested in the ancient language and literature of India, and was the first person to translate the Rigveda into English. In 1813 he published the Sanskrit text with a free translation in English rhymed verse of Kalidasa's lyrical poem, the Meghadūta, or Cloud-Messenger.

He prepared the first Sanskrit–English Dictionary (1819) from materials compiled by native scholars, supplemented by his own researches. This work was only superseded by the Sanskritwörterbuch (1853–1876) of Rudolf Roth and Otto von Böhtlingk, who expressed their obligations to Wilson in the preface to their great work.

He was interested in Ayurveda and traditional Indian medical and surgical practices. He compiled the local practices observed for cholera and leprosy in his publications in the Medical and Physical Society of Calcutta.

In 1827 Wilson published Select Specimens of the Theatre of the Hindus, which contained a very full survey of the Indian drama, translations of six complete plays and short accounts of twenty-three others. His Mackenzie Collection (1828) is a descriptive catalogue of the extensive collection of Oriental, especially South Indian, manuscripts and antiquities made by Colonel Colin Mackenzie, then deposited partly in the India Office, London (now part of the Oriental and India Office Collections of the British Library) and partly at Madras (Chennai). He also wrote a Historical Sketch of the First Burmese War, with Documents, Political and Geographical (1827), a Review of the External Commerce of Bengal from 1813 to 1828 (1830), a translation of Vishnu Purana (1840), and a History of British India from 1805 to 1835, (1844–1848) in continuation of James Mill's 1818 The History of British India.

=== Publications ===
- 1813 The Mēgha Dūta; or, Cloud messenger by Kālidāsa (Revised Second Edition, 1843)
- 1819 A Dictionary, Sanscrit and English (Revised Second Edition, 1832)
- 1827 Select Specimens of the Theatre of the Hindus Volume 1, Volume 2 (Revised Second Edition, 1835 Volume 1, Volume 2)
- 1827 Documents Illustrative of the Burmese War
- 1828 Mackenzie Collection: A Descriptive Catalogue of the Oriental Manuscripts, co-authored with Colin Mackenzie
- 1828 Sketch of the Religious Sects of the Hindus, in Asiatic Researches, Volume XVI, Calcutta. (Expanded edition, 1846)
- 1840 The Vishnu Purána: a system of Hindu mythology and tradition
- 1841 Travels in the Himalyayan Provinces of Hindustan and the Panjab... Volume 1, Volume 2
- 1841 Ariana Antiqua: A descriptive account of the antiquities and coins of Afghanistan
- 1841 An Introduction to the Grammar of Sanskrit Language for the Use of Early Students
- 1845–48 The history of British India from 1805–1835 Volume 1, Volume 2, Volume 3
- 1850–88 Rig-veda Sanhitá : a collection of ancient Hindu hymns Volume 1, Volume 2, Volume 3, Volume 4, Volume 5, Volume 6
- 1852 Narrative of the Burmese war, in 1824–25
- 1855 A glossary of judicial and revenue terms and of useful words occurring in official documents relating to the administration of the government of British India
- 1860 The Hindu History of Kashmir
- 1862–71 Posthumous Collected Edition: Works by the Late Horace Hayman Wilson Volume 1: Religion of the Hindus Vol 1, Volume 2: Religion of the Hindus Vol 2, Volume 3: Essays on Sanskrit Literature Vol 1, Volume 4: Essays on Sanskrit Literature Vol 2, Volume 5: Essays on Sanskrit Literature Vol 3, Volume 6: The Vishnu Purana Vol 1, Volume 7: The Vishnu Purana Vol 2, Volume 8: The Vishnu Purana Vol 3, Volume 9: The Vishnu Purana Vol 4, Volume 10: The Vishnu Purana Vol 5, Volume 11: Theatre of the Hindus Vol 1, Volume 12: Theatre of the Hindus Vol 2
- Principles of Hindu and Mohammedan Law
- Metaphysics of Puranas
