= Raj Kumar Kothari =

Indian academic and Vice-Chancellor of the Sanskrit College and University

Vice-Chancellor of the Sanskrit College and University
- In office 2 June 2023 – 21 January 2026
- Preceded by: Soma Bandhopadhyay
- Succeeded by: Ayan Bhattacharjee

Personal details
- Born: May 8, 1965 (age 61)
- Education: University of Kalyani (M.A.); Pondicherry University (M.Phil.); University of Mumbai (Ph.D.)

Raj Kumar Kothari (born 8 May 1965) is an Indian political scientist and academic. He served as the Vice-Chancellor of the Sanskrit College and University in Kolkata, from 2023 to 2026. Previously, he served as a professor at Diamond Harbour Women's University and Vidyasagar University.

== Education ==
He obtained his M.A. degree in political science from the University of Kalyani in 1988, securing First Class First position. He then earned his M.Phil. degree in International Studies from Pondicherry University in 1990. In 1994, he completed his Ph.D. in political science from the University of Mumbai. In addition, he obtained a Diploma in Russian Language from the University of Mumbai in 1992.

== Career ==
Dr. Kothari has held various teaching and administrative positions at different higher education institutions throughout his career. He served as a Professor and Head of the Department of Political Science at Diamond Harbour Women's University in West Bengal. From 2005 to 2021, he worked as a professor of Political Science at Vidyasagar University. On 2 June 2023, he assumed office as the Vice-Chancellor of the Sanskrit College and University, until January 2026.
