= The Asiatic Society =

Indian learned society (1784-present)

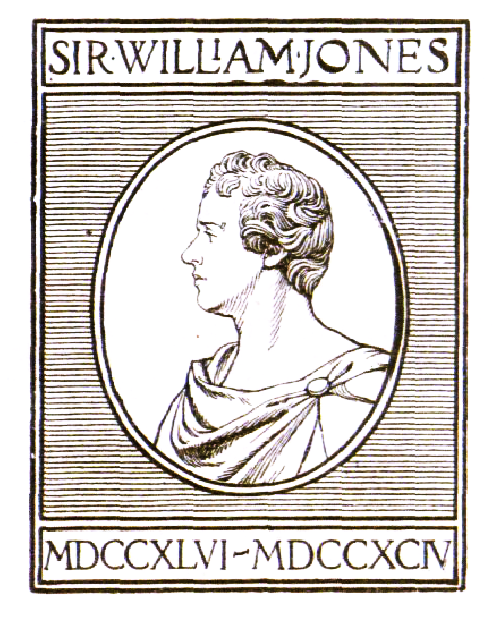

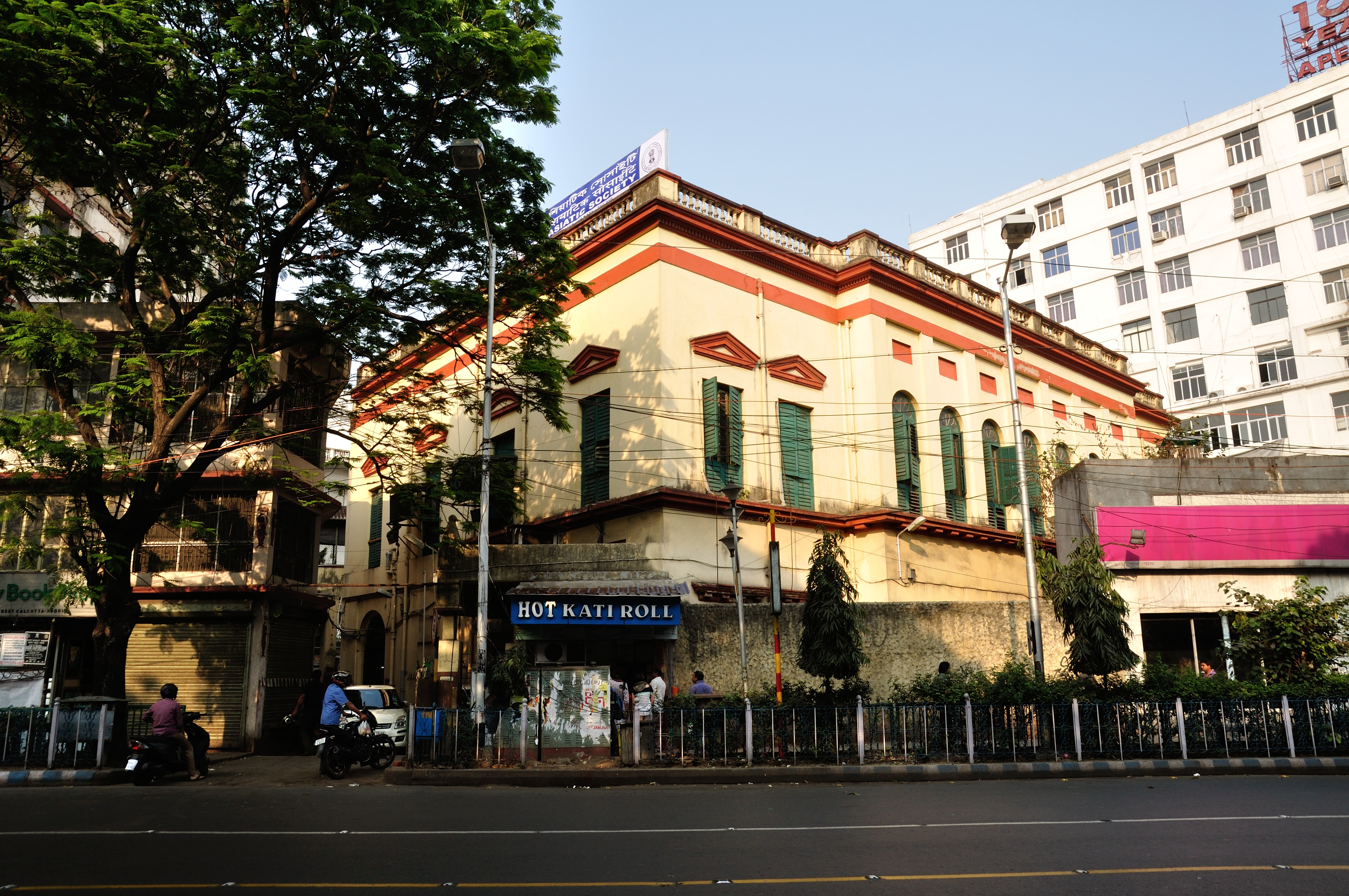
- The Asiatic Society old building in Kolkata
- Established: 15 January 1784; 242 years ago
- Location: 1 Park Street, Kolkata, West Bengal, India
- Coordinates: 22.555175°N 88.350521°E
- Type: Learned society
- Founder: Sir William Jones
- Administrator: Lt. Col. Anant Sinha
- Public transit access: Park Street
- Website: asiaticsociety.culture.gov.in

The Asiatic Society is a learned society under the Ministry of Culture, founded during the Company rule in India to enhance and further the cause of "Oriental research" (in this case, research into India and the surrounding regions). It was founded by the philologist William Jones on 15 January 1784 in a meeting presided over by Justice Robert Chambers in Calcutta, the then-capital of the Presidency of Fort William.

At the time of its foundation, this Society was named as "Asiatick Society". In 1825, the society was renamed as "The Asiatic Society". In 1832 the name was changed to "The Asiatic Society of Bengal" and again in 1936 it was renamed as "The Royal Asiatic Society of Bengal". Finally, on 1 July 1951, the name of the society was changed to its present one. The Society is housed in a building at Park Street in Kolkata (Calcutta). The Society moved into this building during 1808. In 1823, the Medical and Physical Society of Calcutta was formed and all the meetings of this society were held in the Asiatic Society.

== History ==
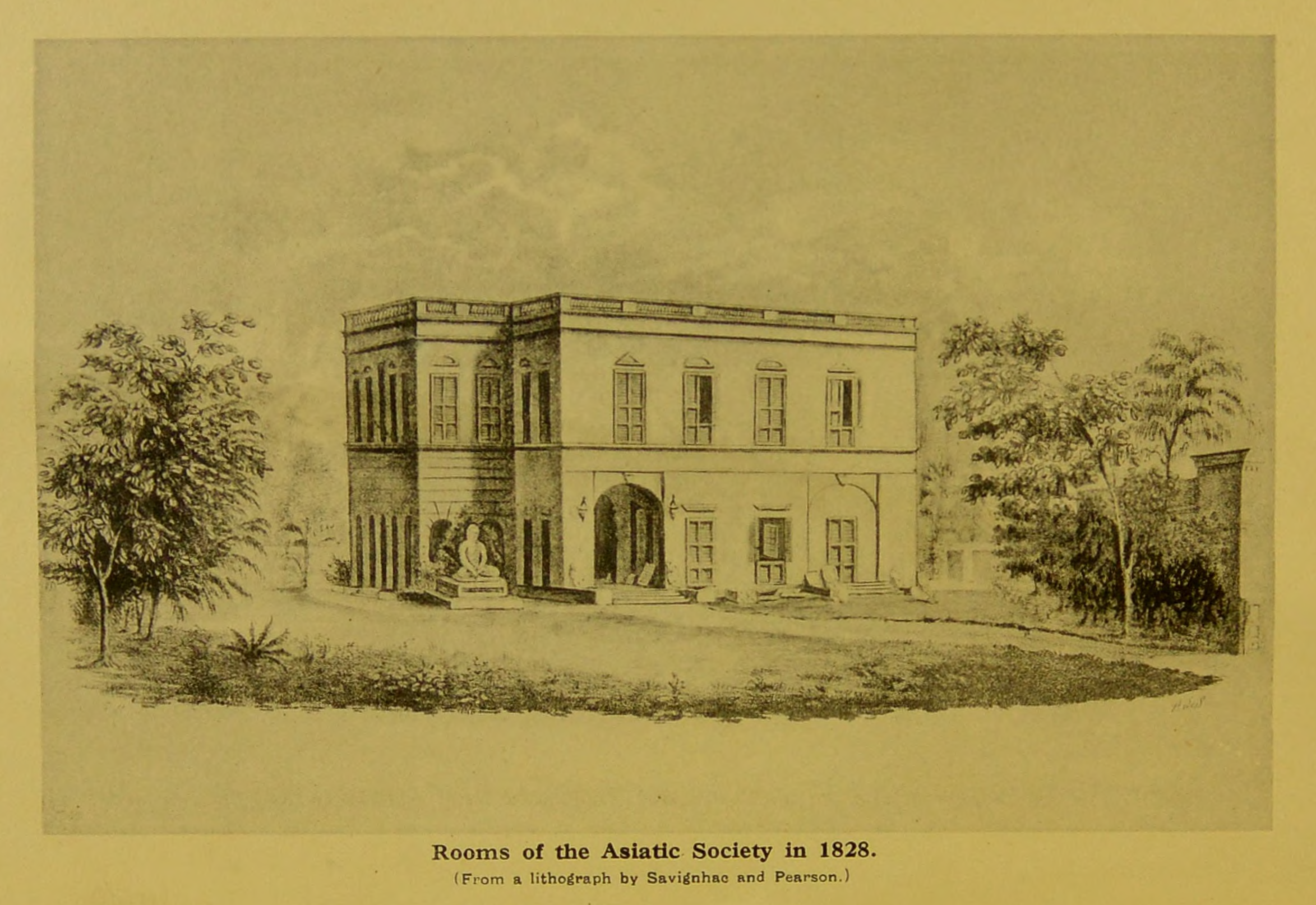
Old building of The Asiatic Society, c. 1828, an early 19th century lithograph

In January 1784, Sir William Jones sent out a circular-letter to a selected number of British residents of Calcutta with a view to establish a society for the Asiatic studies. At his invitation, 30 British residents met in the Grand Jury Room of the Supreme Court (in Calcutta's Fort William) on 15 January 1784. The meeting was presided over by Sir Robert Chambers. At this meeting, Jones explained the aims of the Society he would establish. The Memorandum of Articles of the Asiatic Society, prepared by Jones said:

The bounds of investigations will be the geographical limits of Asia, and within these limits its enquiries will be extended to whatever is performed by man or produced by nature.

Notable early members were Charles Wilkins and Alexander Hamilton (the cousin of the American statesman). Initially, the Grand Jury Room of the Supreme Court was used for the meetings of the members, who had to pay a quarterly fee of two mohurs. The members were elected through ballot-voting. On 29 September 1796, the Society decided to have its own building. J.H. Harrington, then vice-president, selected the corner of Park Street and Chowringhee Road (present location) for the Society's house. The site was granted to the Society on 15 May 1805. The original plan for the new building was prepared by Captain Thomas Preston. The French architect Jean-Jacques Pichou made certain modifications to it and constructed a two-storeyed building at the site. This 15,071 ft^{2} building was built at a cost of Rs. 30,000. The first quarterly meeting of the Society for 1808 was held at its new building on 3 February 1808.

From 1784 to 1828, only Europeans were elected members of the Society. In 1829, at the initiative of H.H. Wilson, a number of Indians were elected members, which include Dwarakanath Tagore, Baboo Rajchunder Das, Sivchandra Das, Maharaja Baidyanath Roy, Maharaja Bunwari Govind Roy, Raja Kalikrishna Bahadur, Ram Comul Sen, and Prasanna Coomar Tagore (member of the Pathuriaghata branch of the Tagore family). On 12 December 1832, Ram Comul Sen was elected 'Native Secretary'. Later, Rajendralal Mitra became the first Indian President in 1885. Both the orientalist Brajendranath De, and one of his grandsons, the historian Barun De, were for some time vice-president of the Asiatic Society.

== Library ==
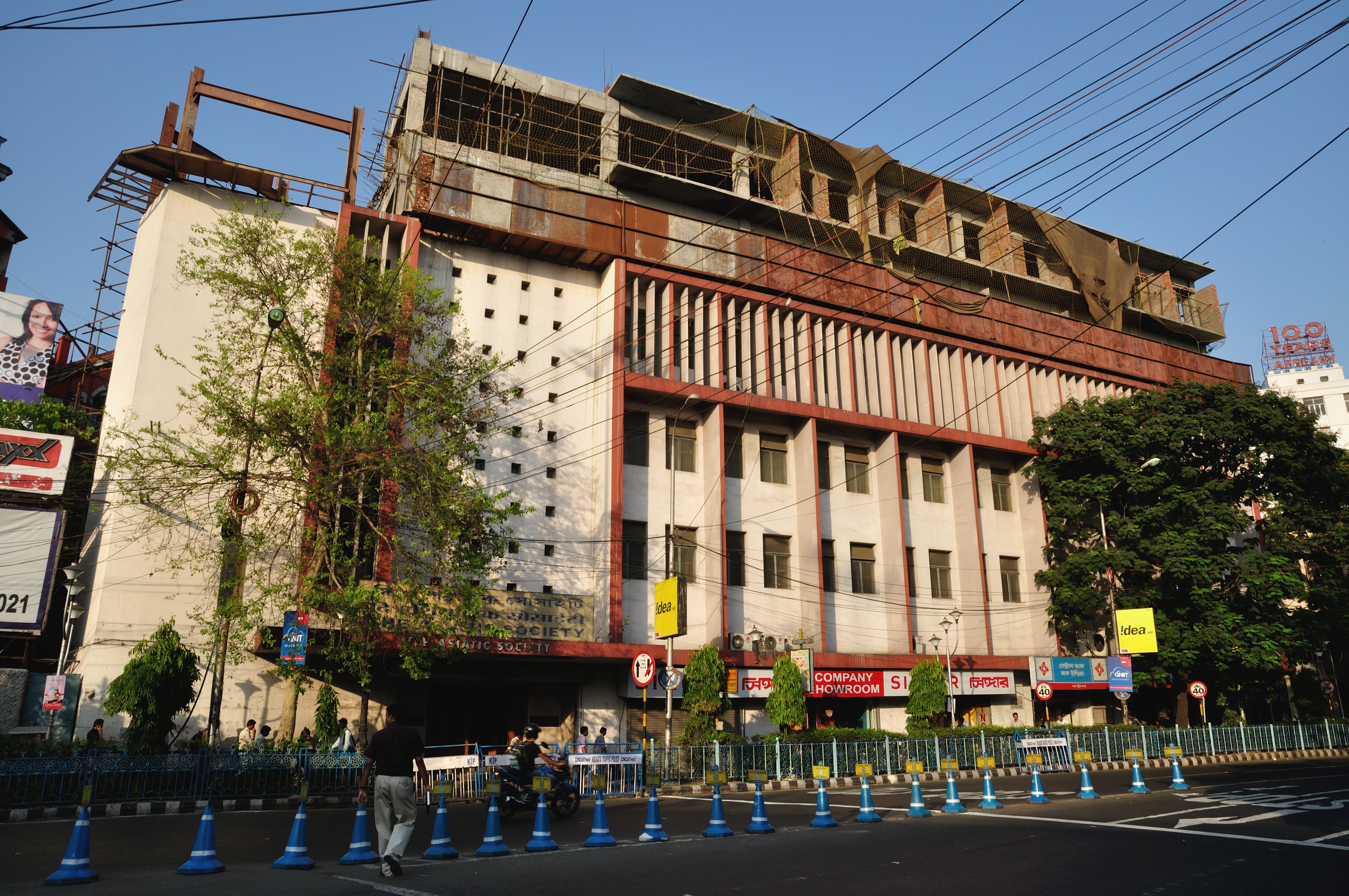
The Asiatic Society building, Park Street, Kolkata, April 2013.

One of the main activities of the Asiatic Society was to collect the old manuscripts of India. There was an enormous collection of Sanskrit manuscripts with the society. At present, the library of the Asiatic Society has a collection of about 117,000 books and 79,000 journals printed in almost all the major languages of the world. It has also a collection of 293 maps, microfiche of 48,000 works, microfilm of 387,003 pages, 182 paintings, 2500 pamphlets, and 2150 photographs. The earliest printed book preserved in this library is Julius Firmicus's Astronomicorum libri octo published in 1499. It has in its possession a large number of books printed in India in the late 18th and early 19th centuries. The library also possesses many rare and scarcely available books. The library has a rich collection of about 47,000 manuscripts in 26 scripts. The most notable amongst them are an illustrated manuscript of the Qur'an, a manuscript of the Gulistan text, and a manuscript of Padshah Nama bearing the signature of Emperor Shahjahan. The library also has coins issued by Chhatrapati Shivaji Maharaj.

The early collection of this library was enriched by the contributions it received from its members. On 25 March 1784, the library received seven Persian manuscripts from Henri Richardson. The next contribution came from William Marsden, who donated his book The History of Sumatra (1783) on 10 November 1784. Robert Home, the first Library-in-Charge (1804) donated his small but valuable collection of works on art. The first accession of importance was a gift from the Seringapatam Committee on 3 February 1808 consisting of a collection from the Palace Library of Tipu Sultan. The library received the Surveyor-General Colonel Mackenzie's collection of manuscripts and drawings in December 1822.

Since 1849, the Society has printed Bibliotheca Indica, a collection of rare and unpublished works belonging to or treating of Oriental literature and containing original text-editions as well as translations into English, and also grammars, dictionaries, bibliographies, and studies.

== Museum ==
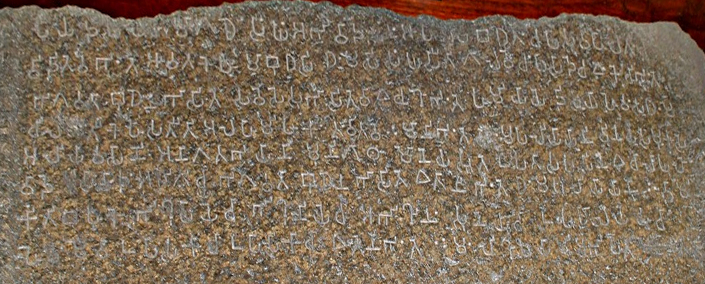
The Bairat Minor Rock Edict of Ashoka (circa 250 BCE) is visible at the Asiatic Society.

The museum of the Society was founded in 1814 under the superintendence of Nathaniel Wallich. The rapid growth of its collection is evident from its first catalogue, published in 1849. By 1849, the Society had its own museum consisting of inscriptions in stone and metal, icons, old coins, and Sanskrit manuscripts etc.

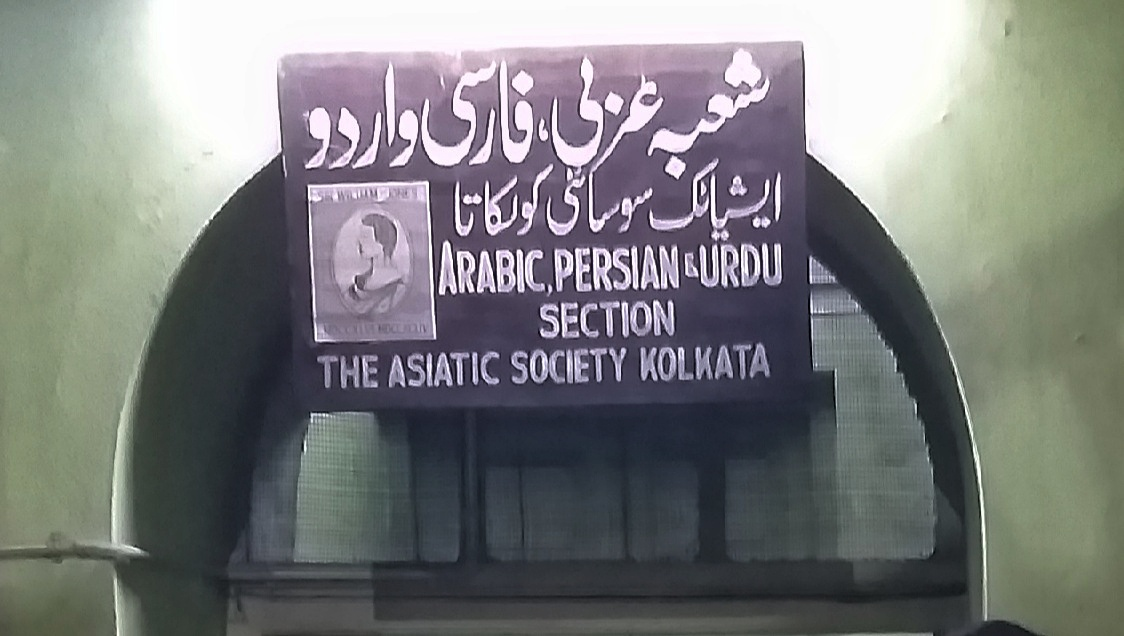
The Arabic, Persian and Urdu section of the Asiatic Society.

When the Indian Museum of Calcutta was established in 1814, the Society handed over most of its valuable collections to it. The Society, however, still has a museum of its own which possesses a rock edict of Asoka (c. 250 BCE) and a significant collection of copper plate inscriptions, coins, sculptures, manuscripts, and archival records. Some masterpieces, like Joshua Reynolds' Cupid asleep on Cloud, Guido Cagnacci's Cleopatra, Thomas Daniell's A Ghat at Benares, and Peter Paul Rubens' Infant Christ are also in the possession of this museum.

== Journal of the Asiatic Society ==
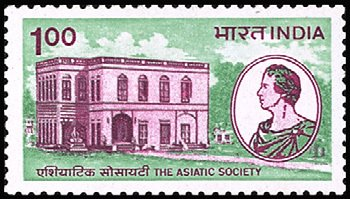
Stamp of India 1984 The Asiatic Society

The Society's journal has had several changes of name, sometimes reflecting changes in the Society. It is currently called the Journal of the Asiatic Society.

- 1798-1842 Asiatick Researches, Transactions of the Society Instituted in Bengal, for enquiring into the History and Antiquities, the Arts, Sciences and Literature, of Asia
- 1832 The Journal of the Asiatic Society of Bengal – James Prinsep was the founding editor
- 1953 The Journal of the Asiatic Society

== See also ==
- The Asiatic Society of Mumbai
- Asiatic Society of Bangladesh
- Calcutta Historical Society
- Société Asiatique
- South Asian Studies

== Works ==
- Asiatic Society of Bengal (1832). Asiatic researches or transactions of the Society instituted in Bengal, for inquiring into the history and antiquities, the arts, sciences, and literature, of Asia, Volume 17.
- Asiatick researches. 1832.
- Asiatick Researches, Or, Transactions of the Society Instituted in Bengal, for Inquiring into the History and Antiquities, the Arts, Sciences, and Literature of Asia, Volume 17. Contributor Asiatick Society (Calcutta, India). Bengal Military Orphans Press. 1832.

In 2025, the Asiatic Society of Kolkata launched 'Anukriti' at its 243rd Foundation Day. Anukriti focuses on the physical recreation of damaged manuscripts using technologies developed in collaboration with the IPCV Laboratory, IIT Kharagpur and CDAC Kolkata.

== References and sources ==
Sources

- Mitra, S.K. (1974). The Asiatic Society, Calcutta: The Asiatic Society.
