= Pushkar (name) =

Pushkar is a name of the following people

Given name

- Pushkar Bhan (1926–2008), radio actor and script writer from Kashmir
- Pushkar Goggiaa, Indian television actor
- Pushkar Lele (born 1979), Hindustani classical vocalist
- Chautariya Pushkar Shah (1784–1841), prime minister of Nepal
- Pushkar Shah, Nepalese peace and democracy activist and adventurer
- Pushkar Sharma (medical researcher), Indian medical scientist
- Pushkar Shrotri, Indian film and theatre actor

Surname

- Pushkar-Gayathri, Tamil film director duo
- Martyn Pushkar (died 1658), Ukrainian Cossack leader and government official
- Pankaj Pushkar, Indian politician
- Sunanda Pushkar (1962–2014), Indian businesswoman
- Vitali Pushkar (born 1983), Israeli swimmer
- Vitaliy Pushkar (born 1987), Ukrainian rally driver

== See also ==
- Pushkar (city in India)
- Pushka (disambiguation) (Пушка a gun or cannon in the Russian language)
  - Pushkaryov
  - Puškarić
  - Pușcaș
  - Puskás (disambiguation)
