= Government Post Graduate College Mardan =

College in Mardan, Pakistan

Coordinates: 34°11′28″N 72°2′9.9″E

- Motto: رَّبِّ زِدْنِي عِلْمًا (Arabic)
- Motto in English: “O my Lord! Advance me in Knowledge.”
- Address: Nowshera Mardan Road, Mardan, Pakistan
- Type: Public
- Established: 1952; 69 years ago
- Principal: Prof. Syed Taskeen Shah
- Location: Mardan, Khyber Pakhtunkhwa, Pakistan
- Campus: Urban
- Journal: Shafaq
- Colours: White, Black & Navy Blue
- Nickname: Mardan College
- Website: www.admission.hed.gkp.pk/college.php?college_id=36

Government Post Graduate College Mardan is a public sector college located in Mardan, Khyber Pakhtunkhwa, Pakistan. The college offers programs for intermediate level in Science, Arts and General Science group and affiliated with Board of Intermediate and Secondary Education Mardan. The college also offers 4 years BS programs in various disciplines for which it is affiliated with Abdul Wali Khan University Mardan.

== History ==
Government Post Graduate College Mardan was established on 14 December 1952 by Governor of Khyber Pakhtunkhwa Khawja Shahab ud Din. At the start it was intermediate college and was called Akbar Memorial College after the name of wealthy family in Mardan, who provided the free land for the college. Later it became a Degree college and became Government College Mardan after purchasing the land.

== Departments ==
- Department of Mathematics
- Department of Physics
- Department of Computer Science
- Department of Zoology
- Department of Botany
- Department of Chemistry
- Department of English
- Department of Urdu
- Department of Pashto
- Department of Economics
- Department of Political Science
- Department of Sociology
- Department of Statistics
- Department of History
- Department of Islamiyat
- Department of Geography

== See also ==
- Abdul Wali Khan University Mardan
- Women University Mardan
- Government Degree College No.02 Mardan
