= UET =

UET may refer to:

- Unitary executive theory, an American constitutional principle
- European University of Tirana (Albanian: Universiteti Europian i Tiranës)
- Quetta International Airport, in Quetta, Balochistan, Pakistan
- European Trotting Union (French: Union Europeenne du Trot)
- University of Engineering and Technology (disambiguation)
