= Lipi (script) =

Word for script in Sanskrit and Pali

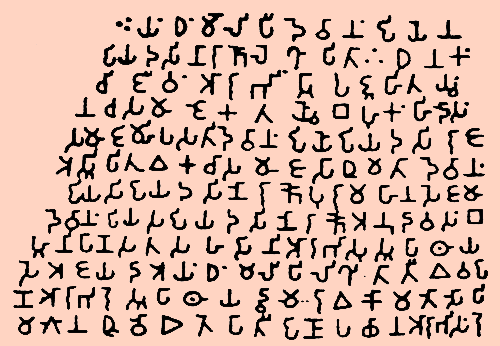
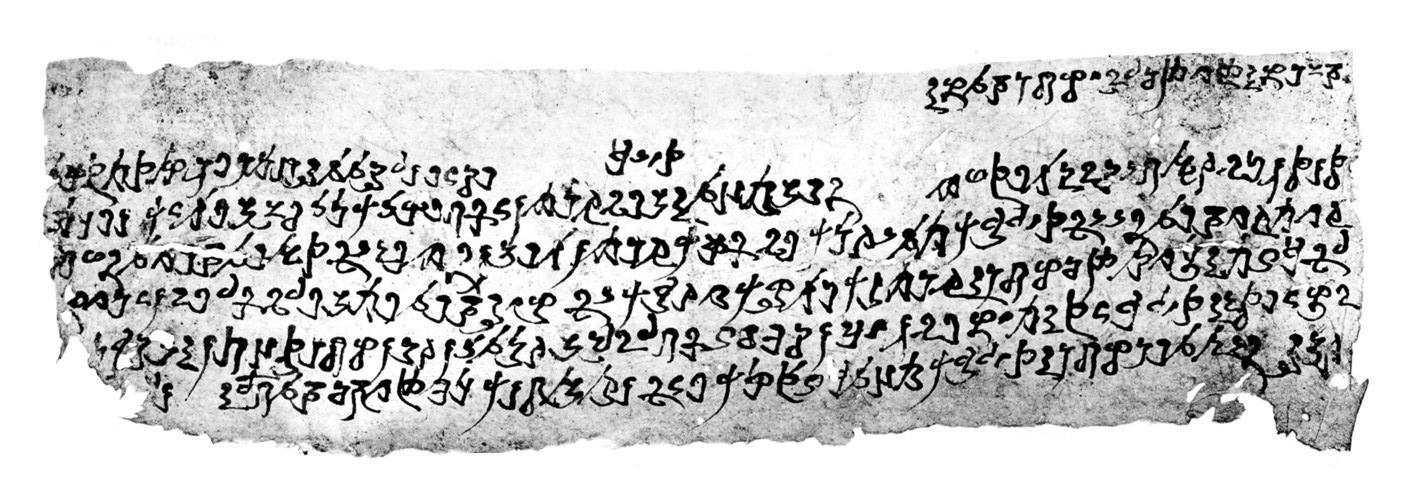
Brahmi (top) and Kharosthi scripts are mentioned as lipi in ancient Indian texts.

Lipi means 'writing, letters, alphabet' both in Sanskrit and Pali, and contextually refers to scripts, the art or manner of writing, or in modified form such as lipī to painting, decorating or anointing a surface to express something.

The term lipi appears in multiple texts of Hinduism, Buddhism, and Jainism, some of which have been dated to the 1st millennium BCE in ancient India. Section 3.2.21 of Pāṇini's Aṣṭādhyāyī (around 500 BCE), mentions lipi in the context of writing. However, Panini does not describe or name a Sanskrit script. The Arthashastra (200 BCE – 300 CE), in section 1.2–5, asserts that lipi was a part of the education system in ancient India.

According to Buddhist texts such as Lalitavistara Sūtra, young Siddhartha — the future Buddha — mastered philology and scripts at a school from Brahmin Lipikara and Deva Vidyasinha. These texts list the lipi that the Buddha of ancient India knew as a child, and the list contains sixty-four scripts, though Salomon states that "the historical value of this list is however limited by several factors". A version of this list of sixty-four ancient Indian scripts is found in the Chinese translation of an Indian Buddhist text, and this translation has been dated to 308 CE.

The canonical texts of Jainism list eighteen lipi, with many names of writing scripts that do not appear in the Buddhist list of sixty-four lipi. The Jaina list of writing scripts in ancient India, states Buhler, is likely "far older" than the Buddhist list.

== Terminology ==
Lipi means 'script, writing, alphabet' both in Sanskrit and Pali. A lipika or lipikara means 'scribe' or 'one who writes', while lipijnana and lekhā means the 'science or art of writing'. Related terms such as lekhā (लेखा, related to rekhā 'line') and likh (लिख) are found in Vedic and post-Vedic Sanskrit texts of Hinduism, as well as in regional languages such as the Pali texts of Buddhism.

A term lip (लिप्) appears in verse 4.4.23 of the Brihadaranyaka Upanishad, verse 5.10.10 Chandogya Upanishad, verse 2 in Isha Upanishad and verse 5.11 in Katha Upanishad. It means 'smear, stain'. These are the early Upanishads and a part of Vedic literature of Hinduism.

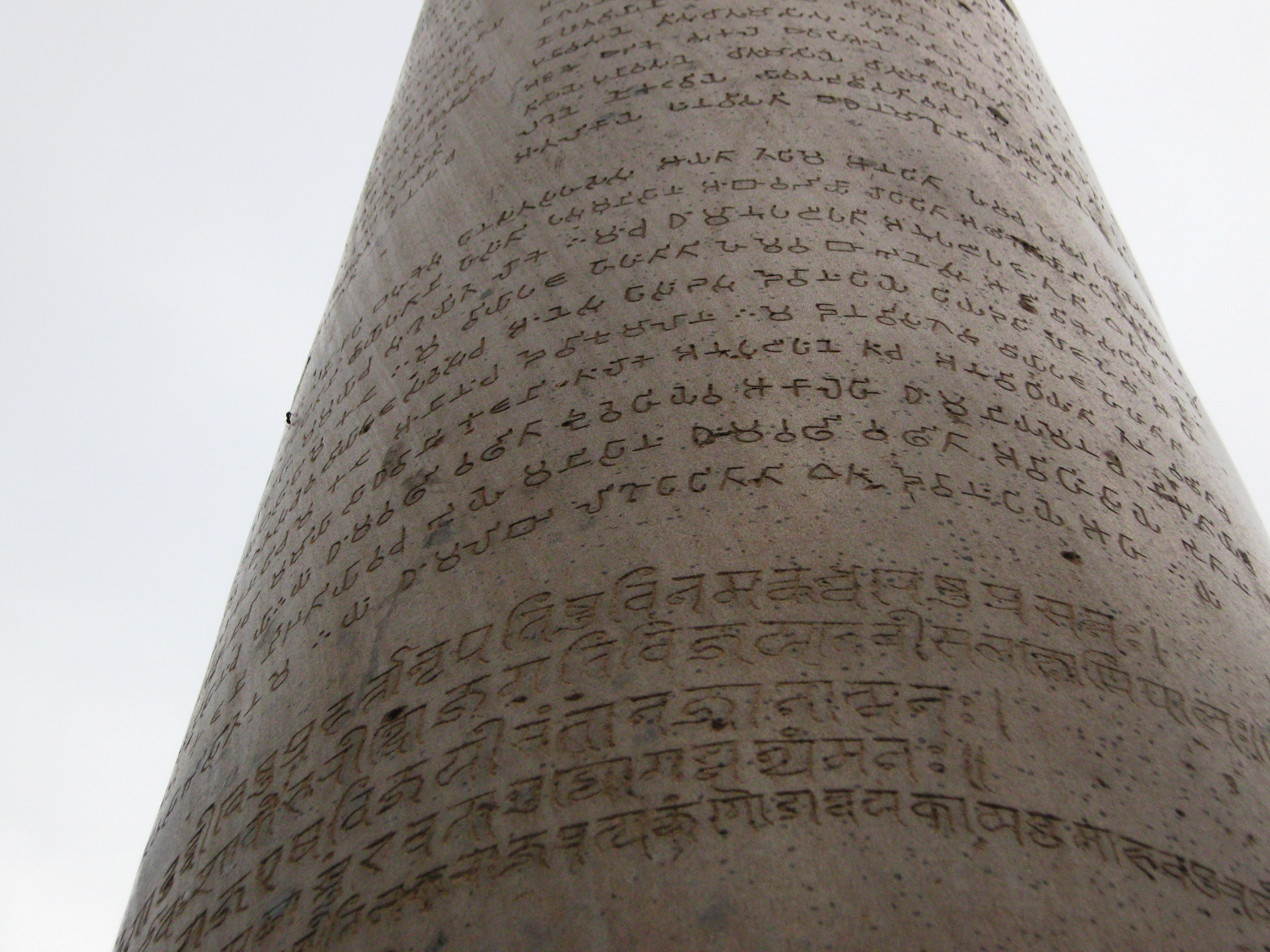
Ashoka pillar edicts evidence the use of lipi in ancient India. The 3rd-century BCE pillar inscription asks people of his and future generations to seek dharma, use persuasion in religion, stop all killing, and be compassionate to all life forms.

According to section 4.119 of the Unadisutras as now received, lipi is derived from the Sanskrit root lip. The Unadisutras themselves certainly existed before the time of Pāṇini, instances of later interpolations have been raised by Max Müller, although Müller does not discuss whether the sutra related to lipi was interpolated. Salomon in 1995 remarked "The external testimony from literary and other sources on the use of writing in pre-Ashokan India is vague and inconclusive. Alleged evidence of pre-Mauryan writing has in the past been found by various scholars in such sources as later Vedic literature, the Pali canon, the early Sanskrit grammatical treatises of Pāṇini's and his successors, and the works of European classical historians. But all of these references are subject in varying degrees to chronological or interpretive problems."

The Edicts of Ashoka (circa 250 BCE) use the word lipī. According to some authors, the word lipi, which is spelled dipi in the two Kharosthi versions of the rock edicts, (Note: For example, the first line of the first Edicts at Shahbazgarhi (or at Mansehra) reads: "(Ayam) Dhrama-dipi Devanapriyasa Raño likhapitu" ("This Dharma-Edicts was written by King Devanampriya".) Inscriptions of Asoka. New Edition by E. Hultzsch (in Sanskrit). 1925. p. 51.) comes from the Old Persian prototype dipi (𐎮𐎡𐎱𐎡), which also means 'inscription', which is for instance used by Darius I in his Behistun inscription. (Note: For example Column IV, Line 89) Old Persian dipi in turn is a loanword from Sumerian dup. E. Hultzsch, an epigraphist in the colonial British Empire, in his 1925 study on the Inscriptions of Asoka, considered the lip derivation untenable because of the two Kharosthi rock edict inscriptions from 3rd century BCE which use dipi instead of lipi. Hultzsch, as well as Sharma, state that this suggests a borrowing and diffusion of lipi from an Old Persian prototype dipi. It has also been theorised that The Sanskrit term lipi (लिपि) is derived directly from the verbal root "lip" (लिप्), meaning "to smear, coat, or stain"—a direct reference to applying liquid pigment during the act of writing. This root is well-attested throughout Sanskrit literature in words such as lipta (लिप्त) and liptaka (लिप्तक), as well as in modern Indo-Aryan languages like Hindi (lep, lepan). At a deeper historical level, it descends from the Proto-Indo-European root *leyp- ("to stick or adhere"), which also generated cognates across other Indo-European branches, such as Ancient Greek lipos (fat/grease) and the English term lipid.By contrast, the Old Persian term dipi traces its lineage back to Sumerian roots and gained currency primarily in the northwestern borderlands of the subcontinent through regional administrative interaction. Its appearance in Kharoṣṭhī inscriptions represents a localized lexical borrowing typical of language contact zones, whereas lipi served as the native, organic development across the broader region.

== Chronology ==
Some Indian traditions credit Brahma with inventing lipi, the scripts for writing. Scholars such as Lallanji Gopal claim some ancient lipi such as the Brahmi script as used in the Indian texts, may have originated in Jainism.

"Lipi" in the Edicts of Ashoka

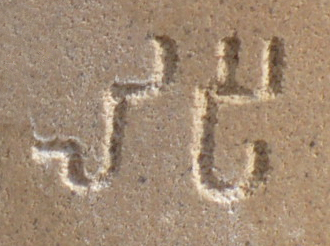
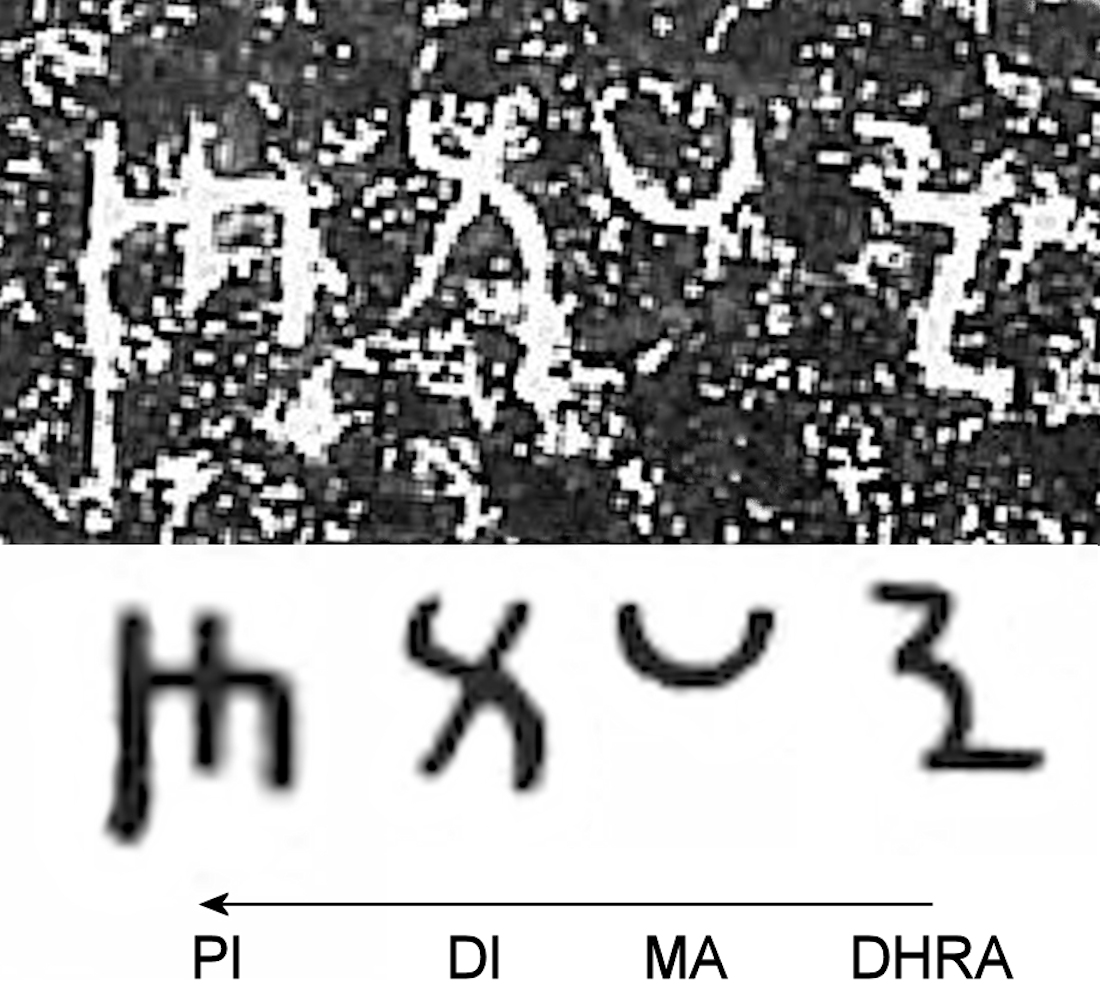
Left: The word Lipī used by Ashoka to describe his "Edicts" (Brahmi script); Right: In Kharosthi, Edict No.1 of the Shahbazgarhi Major Rock Edict of Ashoka (circa 250 BCE) reads "Di" rather than "Li".

According to Harry Falk, scripts and the idea of writing can be traced to the Indus Valley civilization in the 3rd millennium BCE, but the term lipi in 1st millennium BCE Indian literature may be a loan word from the Achaemenid Empire, as a variant of Sumerian dub, turned to dipi or dipī. Sanskrit lipi, states Falk, likely arose from a combination of foreign influences and indigenous inventions. One evidence in favor of this view is that the form dipi was used in some of the Kharosthi-script edicts of Ashoka (3rd century BCE) in northwest India (in closest contact to Achaemenid culture) in parallel to lipi in other regions. As dipi was used in Old Persian Achaemenid inscriptions, Hultzsch suggested in 1925 that this proposal is "irresistible." In his theory about the origin of the Brahmi script, Falk states that the early mention by Paṇini could mean that he was aware of writing scripts in West Asia around 500 BCE, and the Paṇini's mention of lipikara may possibly refer to non-Indian writers such as Aramaic scribes.

"Lipi" in Paṇini

Falk states that the single isolated mention of lipi by Paṇini, could mean that he was only aware of writing scripts from West Asia around 500 BCE. According to Paul Griffiths, there is "no hard evidence of the use of Brahmi or Kharosthi script" in India before the Ashoka stone inscription, but the climate of India is such as that writing on other materials would not have survived for over 2,500 years. So, states Griffith, "the absence of early witnesses certainly doesn't mean there were none", but there is no "clear textual evidence of the use of writing in the Vedic corpus".

Opinions on origination

Kenneth Norman (a professor and the president of the Pali Text Society) suggests lipi in ancient India evolved over the long period of time like other cultures, that it is unlikely that a lipi was devised as a single complete writing system at one and the same time in the Maurya era. Norman suggests that it is even less likely that Brāhmī was invented during Ashoka's rule, starting from nothing, for the specific purpose of writing his inscriptions and understood all over South Asia. Reviewing the recent archaeological discoveries relating to writing scripts in South Asia particularly Buddhism, Norman writes, "Support for this idea of pre-Ashoka development [of writing scripts] has been given very recently by the discovery of sherds at Anuradhapura in Sri Lanka, inscribed with small numbers of characters which seem to be Brahmi. These sherds have been dated, by both carbon 14 and thermo-luminescence dating, to pre-Ashokan times, perhaps as much as two centuries before Ashoka".

Jack Goody similarly suggests that ancient India likely had a "very old culture of writing" along with its oral tradition of composing and transmitting knowledge, because the Vedic literature is too vast, consistent and complex to have been entirely created, memorized, accurately preserved and spread without a written system. Walter Ong and John Hartley concur with Goody and share the same concerns about the theory that there may not have been any writing scripts during the Vedic age, given the quantity and quality of the Vedic literature.

Falk disagrees with Goody, and suggests that it is a Western presumption and inability to imagine remarkably early scientific achievements such as Panini's grammar (5th to 4th century BCE), and the creation, preservation and wide distribution of the large corpus of the Brahmanic Vedic literature and the Buddhist canonical literature, without any writing scripts. Johannes Bronkhorst (professor of Sanskrit and Indian studies) acknowledges that Falk is widely regarded as the definitive study on this subject, but disagrees and states, "Falk goes too far. It is fair to expect that we believe that Vedic memorisation — though without parallel in any other human society — has been able to preserve very long texts for many centuries without losing a syllable. (...) However, the oral composition of a work as complex as Pāṇini’s grammar is not only without parallel in other human cultures, it is without parallel in India itself. (...) It just will not do to state that our difficulty in conceiving any such thing is our problem".

Richard Salomon, in a 1995 review, states that the lack of securely datable specimens of writing from pre-3rd century BCE period, coupled with chronological and interpretive problems of more ancient Indian texts, has made dating lipi and who influenced whom a controversial problem.

== Ancient Indian scripts ==
While historical evidence of scripts is found in the Indus Valley civilization relics, these remain undeciphered. There has been a lack of similar historical evidence from the 2nd and early 1st millennium BCE, until the time of Ashoka where the 3rd-century BCE pillar edicts evidence the Brahmi script. Late 20th-century archaeological studies combined with carbon dating techniques at Ujjain and other sites suggest that Brahmi script existed on the ancient Indian subcontinent as early as 450 BCE.

Sri Lankan texts and inscriptions suggest that written script were in extensive use in ancient India, and had arrived in Sri Lanka by about 3rd century BCE. While scholars agree that developed writing scripts existed and were in use by the second half of the 1st millennium BCE, the chronology and the origins of lipi in ancient India remain a controversial, difficult and unresolved scholarly topic.

=== Indian and Chinese Buddhist texts ===
The tenth chapter of the Lalitavistara, named Lipisala samdarshana parivarta, lists the following 64 scripts as what Siddhartha (the Gautam Buddha) learned as a child from his schools. This list is found in both Indian Buddhist texts and its ancient Chinese translations: (Note: The names of scripts in this list varies by manuscript and Buddhist text, states Richard Salomon.)

1. Brāhmī
2. Kharoṣṭī
3. Puṣkarasāriṃ
4. Aṅga-lipiṃ
5. Vaṅga-lipiṃ
6. Magadha-lipiṃ
7. Maṅgalya-lipiṃ
8. Aṅgulīya-lipiṃ
9. Śakāri-lipiṃ
10. Brahmavali-lipiṃ
11. Pāruṣya-lipiṃ
12. Drāviḍa-lipiṃ
13. Kirāta-lipiṃ
14. Dākṣiṇya-lipiṃ
15. Ugra-lipiṃ
16. Saṃkhyā-lipiṃ
17. Anuloma-lipiṃ
18. Avamūrdha-lipiṃ
19. Darada-lipiṃ
20. Khāṣya-lipiṃ
21. Cīna-lipiṃ
22. Lūna-lipiṃ
23. Hūṇa-lipiṃ
24. Madhyākṣaravistara-lipiṃ
25. Puṣpa-lipiṃ
26. Deva-lipiṃ
27. Nāga-lipiṃ
28. Yakṣa-lipiṃ
29. Gandharva-lipiṃ
30. Kinnara-lipiṃ
31. Mahoraga-lipiṃ
32. Asura-lipiṃ
33. Garuḍa-lipiṃ
34. Mṛgacakra-lipiṃ
35. Vāyasaruta-lipiṃ
36. Bhaumadeva-lipiṃ
37. Antarīkṣadeva-lipiṃ
38. Uttarakurudvīpa-lipiṃ
39. Aparagoḍānī-lipiṃ
40. Pūrvavideha-lipiṃ
41. Utkṣepa-lipiṃ
42. Nikṣepa-lipiṃ
43. Vikṣepa-lipiṃ
44. Prakṣepa-lipiṃ
45. Sāgara-lipiṃ
46. Vajra-lipiṃ
47. Lekhapratilekha-lipiṃ
48. Anudruta-lipiṃ
49. Śāstrāvartāṃ
50. Gaṇanāvarta-lipiṃ
51. Utkṣepāvarta-lipiṃ
52. Nikṣepāvarta-lipiṃ
53. Pādalikhita-lipiṃ
54. Dviruttarapadasaṃdhi-lipiṃ
55. Yāvaddaśottarapadasaṃdhi-lipiṃ
56. Madhyāhāriṇī-lipiṃ
57. Sarvarutasaṃgrahaṇī-lipiṃ
58. Vidyānulomāvimiśrita-lipiṃ
59. Ṛṣitapastaptāṃrocamānāṃ
60. Dharaṇīprekṣiṇī-lipiṃ
61. Gaganaprekṣiṇī-lipiṃ
62. Sarvauṣadhiniṣyandāṃ
63. Sarvasārasaṃgrahaṇīṃ
64. Sarvabhūtarutagrahaṇīm

Historicity

The historical value of this list of lipis is however limited, states Salomon, by several factors. Although the Buddhist text with this list is ancient because it was translated into Chinese in 308 CE, the date of its actual composition is unknown. According to Salomon, the canonical texts of Buddhism may not be authentic and have interpolations. For example, he suggests that "Huna-lipi" or the script of the Huns listed as 23rd lipi in this list suggests that this part and the present form of the Buddhist text may have been fabricated in the 4th century CE. Other than Brahmi and Kharosthi lipi mentioned in this list which can be positively identified with historic inscriptions, other writing scripts consist presumably of regional derivatives of Brahmi which cannot be specifically identified. Some names such as Naga-lipi and Yaksa-lipi appear fanciful, states Salomon, which raises suspicions about historicity of this section of the Buddhist canonical text. However, adds Salomon, a simpler but shorter list of 18 lipis exist in the canonical texts of Jainism, an ancient Indian religion that competed with Buddhism and Hinduism. Buhler states that the Jaina lipi list is "in all probability considerably older" than the Buddhist list of 64 writing scripts in ancient India. The Jaina list does not have names that Salomon considers fanciful.

The authenticity of Lalitavistara Sutra where this list appears and other canonical texts of Theravada and Mahayana Buddhist traditions, as well as "a complete denial of the existence of a historical Buddha", has been among the long debated questions in Buddhism scholarship. Suspicions about the historicity of Lalitavistara, states EJ Thomas, are built upon presumptions which seek to reconstruct early history to fit certain theories and assumptions about what must have come first and what must have come later.

=== Tibetan texts ===
Lipi with rounded shapes is mentioned in 7th-century Tibetan texts.

The Magadhalipi mentioned in the Lalitavistara is discussed in the 7th-century Tibetan texts, in two forms: dBu-can (script with matra or the framing horizontal line drawn above each letter of the alphabet), and dBu-med (script without matra). The former is derived from the more ancient Lantsha script, while the latter derived from the Vartula script. According to Cristina Scherrer-Schaub, Vartula means "rounded shape" and likely refers to the rounded letters of alphabet that were invented for various ancient Indian scripts. Scherrer-Schaub adds that the list of sixty-four scripts in the Buddhist text likely contains scripts that are fictional, with Devalipi and Nagalipi as examples.

=== Jain texts ===
A smaller list of eighteen ancient Indian lipi is found in the Prakrit texts of Jainism (spelled as lipi sometimes), such as the Pannavana Sutra (2nd century BCE) and the Samavayanga Sutra (3rd century BCE). This list shares some names found in the Buddhist lists of ancient Indian scripts, but includes new names. The Jaina script list includes Brahmi at number 1, Kharosthi at number 4, but includes Javanaliya(Greek) and others which are not found in the Buddhist lists. Scholars such as Buhler state that the Jaina list of ancient Indian scripts is likely older than the Buddhist list, but still belonging to the second half of the 1st millennium BCE wherein Javanaliya probably is the same as one of the many Sanskrit scripts called Yavanani, which was derived from the Greek (Yavana) alphabet. The Jaina canonical texts list the following writing scripts in ancient India:

1. Brahmi
2. Javanaliya (Greek)
3. Dosapuriya
4. Kharosthi
5. Pukkharasariya
6. Bhogavaiya
7. Paharaiyao
8. Amtarikariya
9. Akkharaputthiya
10. Venaiya
11. Ninhaiya
12. Amka-livi
13. Ganita-livi
14. Gamdhavva-livi
15. Ayamsa-livi
16. Mahesari
17. Damili (Tamil Brahmi)
18. Polimdi

== Devalipi and Devanagari ==
Given the similarity in the name, Devanagari may have roots in Devalipi, but Walter Maurer states that there is no verifiable evidence to prove that this is so. According to Richard Salomon, the Brahmi script evolved to become both the north Indian scripts such as Devanagari, Punjabi, Gujarati and Bengali, as well as the south Indian scripts such as Tamil, Telugu, Kannada and Malayalam.

== See also ==
- Related topics
  - Brahmi script
  - Indus script
  - Kharosthi script
  - Kohi script
  - Tamil script
- Other similar topics
  - Early Indian epigraphy
  - Edicts of Ashoka
  - History of India
  - Indian copper plate inscriptions
  - South Indian Inscriptions
