= Pushkaryov =

Pushkaryov or Pushkarev (Russian: Пушкарёв, from пушкарь meaning artilleryman) is a Russian masculine surname, its feminine counterpart is Pushkaryova or Pushkareva. It may refer to:

- Aleksei Pushkarev (born 1986), Russian bobsledder
- Andrei Pushkarev (born 1985), Russian football player
- Konstantin Pushkaryov (born 1985), Kazakhstani ice hockey winger
- Marina Pushkareva (born 1989), Russian football player
- Vladimir Pushkarev (1921–1994), Russian weightlifter
- Vladimir Pushkaryov (born 1973), Russian politician

== See also ==
- Pushkar (disambiguation)
