= Pushkar (disambiguation) =

Pushkar is a town in the Indian state of Rajasthan. It may also refer to

- Pushkar Fair in Pushkar
- Pushkar railway station in Pushkar
- Pushkar Lake near Pushkar
- Brahma Temple, Pushkar
- Pushkar (name), an Indian name
- Pushkara, a character in the ancient Indian epic Mahabharata
- Pashkar Nath Pandit, a fictional character portrayed by Anupam Kher in the 2022 Indian film The Kashmir Files
- Pushkara (film), a 2023 Indian film
- Pushkara Mallikarjunaiah (born 1980), Indian film producer

== See also ==
- Pushkarani, a type of temple tank in India
- Pushkarasarin, a ruler of Gandhara in ancient India
- Pushkarasari script, an undeciphered writing system of Gandhara
