= University of Engineering & Technology, Mardan =

Public university in Mardan, Khyber Pakhtunkhwa, Pakistan

Coordinates: 34°11′56.7″N 72°01′10″E

University of Engineering and Technology, Mardan
- Type: Public
- Established: 2018
- Affiliations: Higher Education Commission (Pakistan), Pakistan Engineering Council
- Chancellor: Governor of Khyber Pakhtunkhwa
- Vice-Chancellor: Prof. Dr. Gul Muhammad
- Dean: Prof. Dr. Sadaqat Jan
- Pro-Vice Chancellor: Prof. Dr. Imran Khan
- Location: Mardan, Khyber Pakhtunkhwa, Pakistan
- Colours: Royal blue
- Nickname: UET Mardan
- Website: uetmardan.edu.pk

The University of Engineering & Technology, Mardan (UET Mardan) is a public university located in Mardan, Khyber Pakhtunkhwa, Pakistan.

== History ==
Government of Khyber Pakhtunkhwa established a sub campus of University of Engineering and Technology, Peshawar in Mardan in 2002. It was upgraded into a full-fledged university in October 2018.

== Departments ==
- Computer Software Engineering
- Electrical Engineering
- Telecommunication Engineering
- Civil Engineering
- Mechanical Engineering
- Computer Science
- Center of Artificial Intelligence

== See also ==
- Abdul Wali Khan University Mardan
- Women University Mardan
- Bacha Khan Medical College, Mardan
