= Mardan =

Mardan مردان (Pashto)
- City
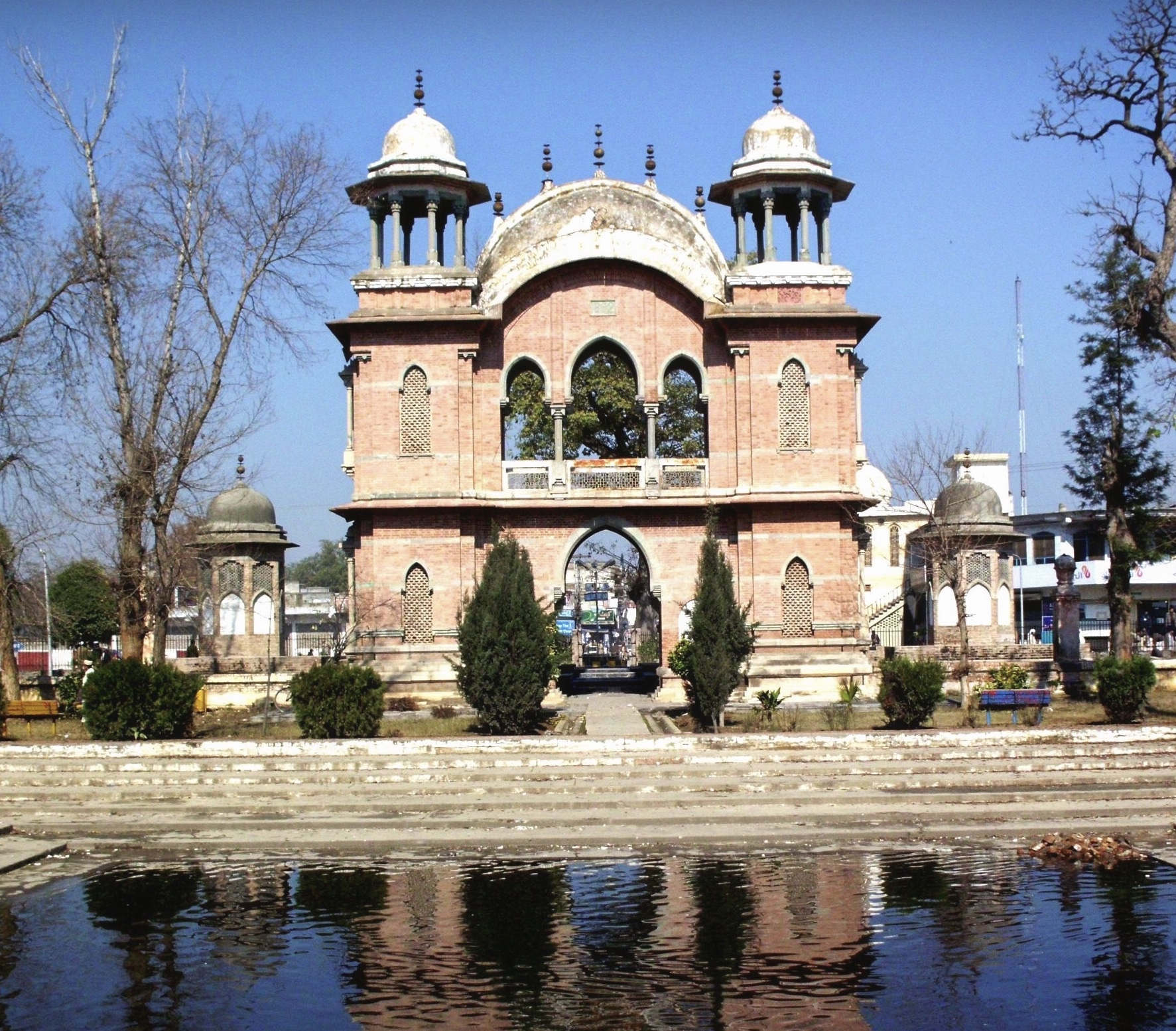
- Mardan's Guides Memorial was built in 1892 to honour fallen soldiers who fought during the 1879 Siege of the British Residency in Kabul

- Location within Khyber Pakhtunkhwa Location within Pakistan
- Coordinates: 34°12′4.4″N 72°01′33″E
- Country: Pakistan
- Province: Khyber Pakhtunkhwa
- District: Mardan
- Tehsil: Mardan

Government
  - Type: Mayor-council
  - Body: District Government
  - Mayor: Hamayatullah Mayar (ANP)
  - Commissioner: Syed Abdul Jabar Shah
  - Deputy Commissioner: Habibullah Arif
  - Deputy Inspector General of Police: Yaseen Khalil
- Elevation: 310 m (1,020 ft)

Population (2023)
  - City: 368,302
  - Rank: 25th, Pakistan; 2nd, Khyber Pakhtunkhwa
- Mardan Municipal Committee: 363,788; Mardan Cantonment: 4,514
- Time zone: UTC+5 (PST)
- Calling code: +92 937
- HDI (2024): 0.735 high
- Website: mardan.kp.gov.pk

Mardan (Note: Pashto and Urdu: مردان, romanized: Mardān; Urdu; Pashto:) is a city in the Mardan District of Khyber Pakhtunkhwa province of Pakistan. Located in the Valley of Peshawar, Mardan is the second largest city of Khyber Pakhtunkhwa (only after Peshawar). It is a fast growing city that experienced a population boom in the latter half of the 20th century.

Around 1800 BCE, the area around Mardan was part of the homeland of the Gandhara grave culture. Rock edicts of the ancient Indian King Ashoka in the nearby Shahbaz Garhi, written in the right-to-left Kharosthi script, dates from the Mauryan period (mid-200s BCE) and represent the earliest irrefutable evidence of writing in South Asia. The nearby Takht-i-Bahi has remains of an ancient Buddhist monastery was listed as a UNESCO World Heritage Site in 1980.

== History ==
Mardan is located in a region which is rich in archaeological sites. In 1962, the Sanghao Caves were discovered outside of Mardan, which yielded artefacts from the Middle Paleolithic period, over 30,000 years ago. Other sites in the immediate area have yielded evidences of human activity from the Upper Paleolithic period. Further excavations in the area around Jamal Garhi near Mardan recovered artefacts from the Mesolithic period.

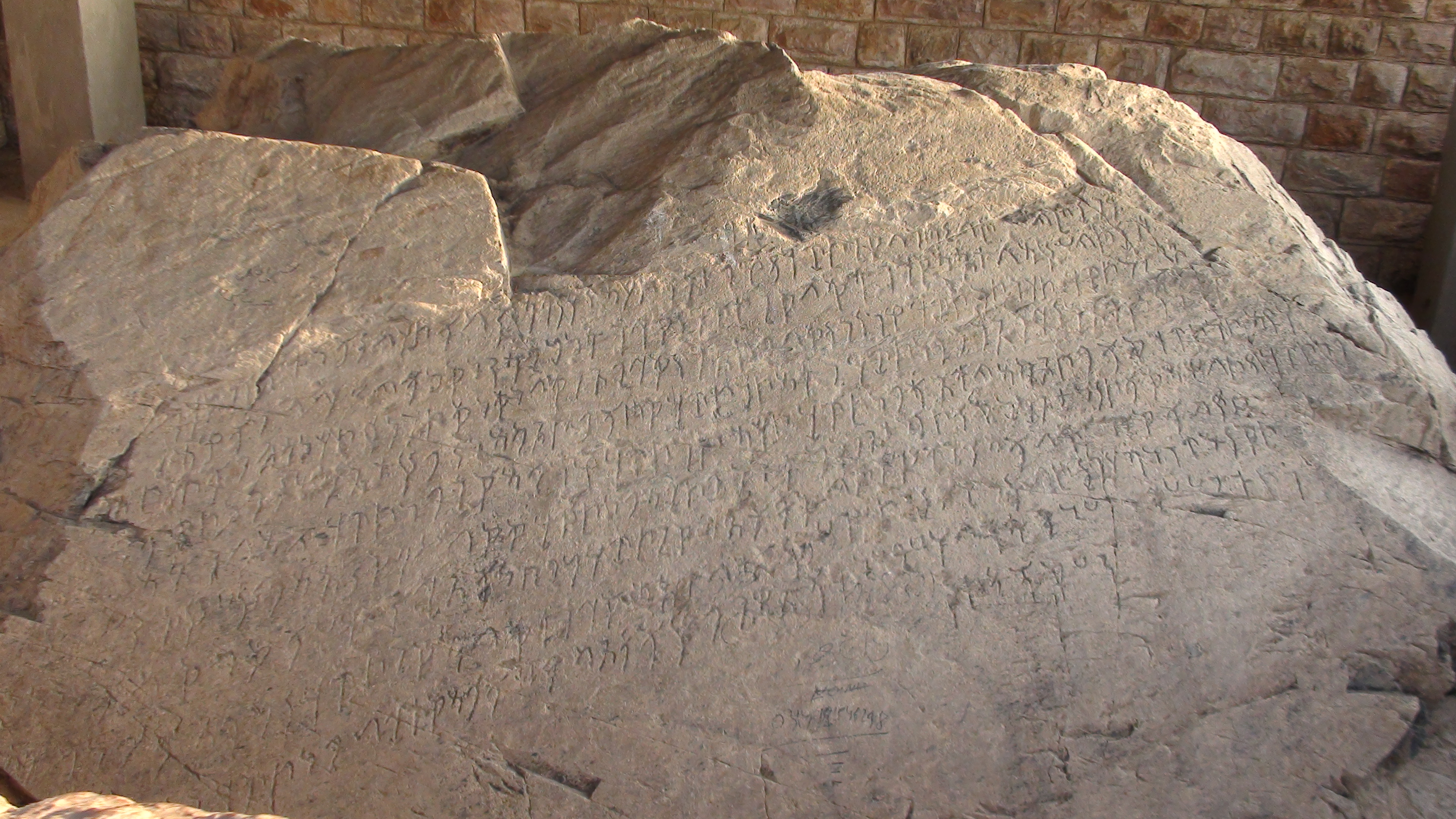
The Edicts of Ashoka were carved on a massive boulder near Mardan around 250 BCE.

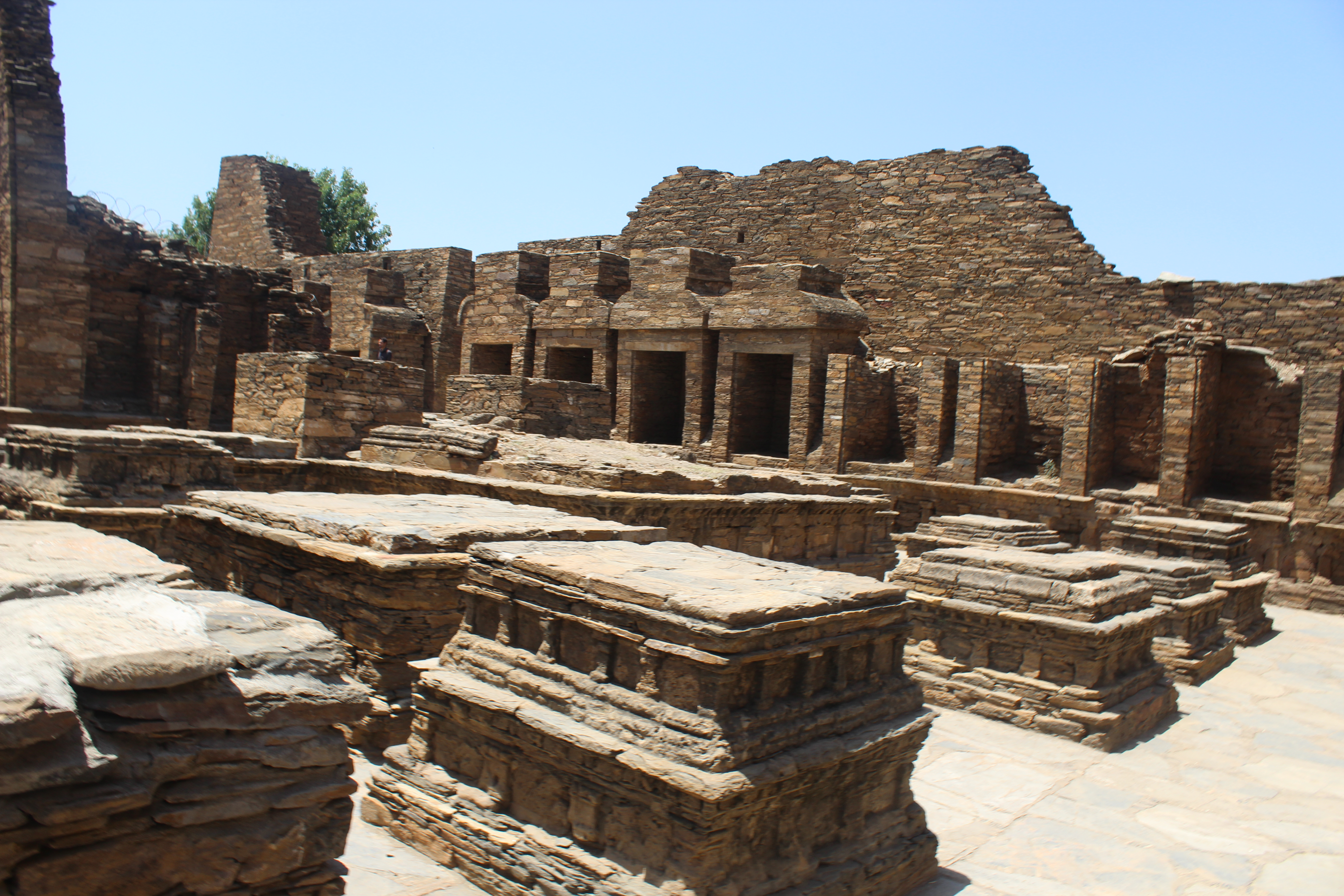
The Takht-i-Bahi complex near Mardan dates from the first century CE.

The area around Mardan then formed part of the homeland of the Gandhara grave culture around 1800 BCE. The Gandharan grave culture appears to have been a Central Asian group that may represent part of the Indo-Aryan migrations into the subcontinent. Mardan then formed part of the ancient Buddhist kingdom of Gandhara. Rock edicts of Ashoka in nearby Shahbaz Garhi date from the Mauryan period in the mid-200s BCE, and are written in the ancient Kharosthi script.

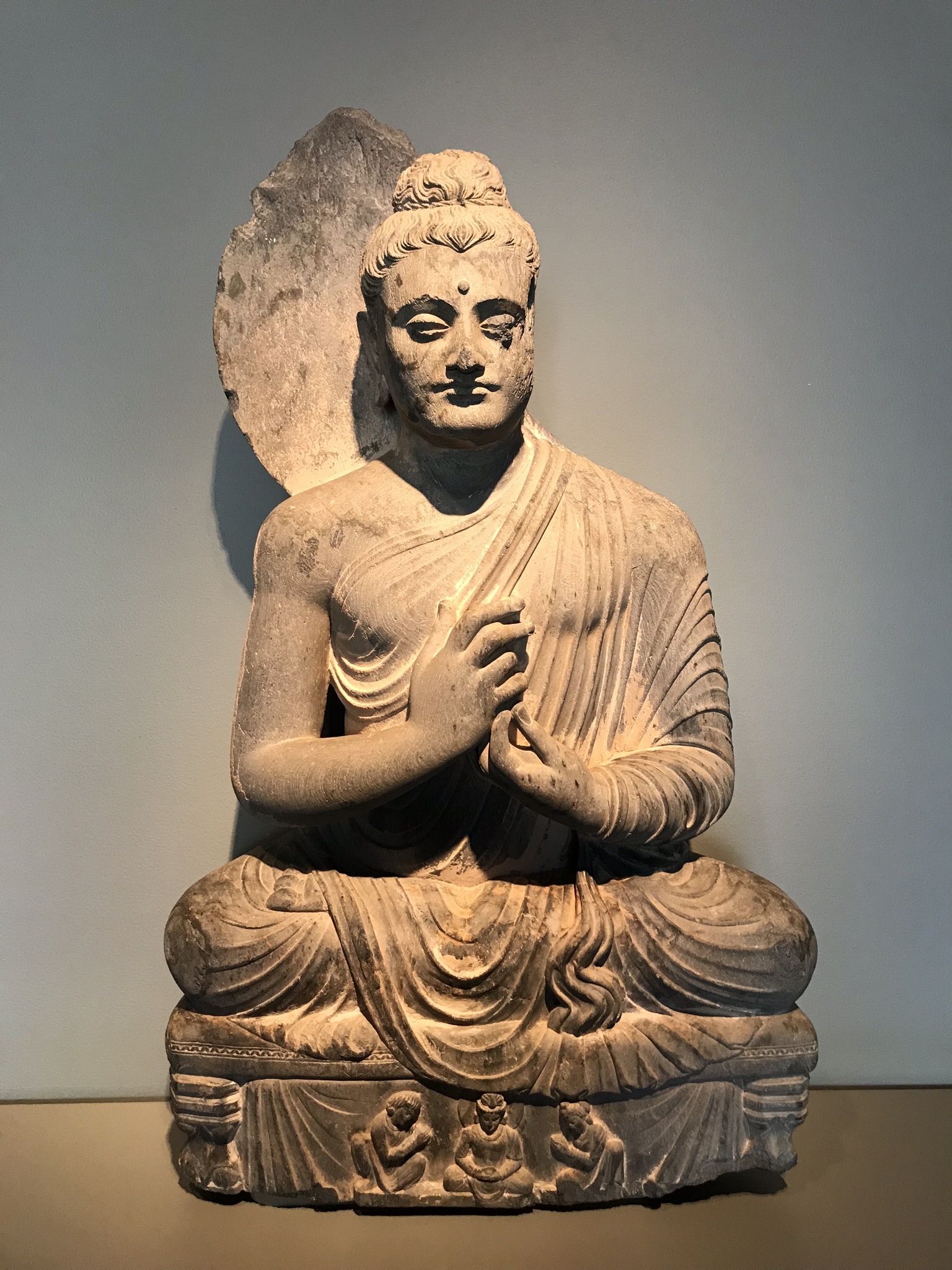
The Seated Buddha, dating from 300 to 500 CE, was found near Mardan, and is now on display at the Asian Art Museum in San Francisco.

The nearby UNESCO World Heritage Site of Takht-i-Bahi was established as a monastery around 46 CE. The Bakhshali manuscript, which contains the earliest record of the use of the number 0 in the Indian subcontinent, was found near Mardan in 1891, and dates from the third or fourth century CE. It is the oldest extant manuscript in Indian mathematics. The nearby Kashmir Smast caves served Buddhist hermit monks, and dates from the fourth to ninth century CE.

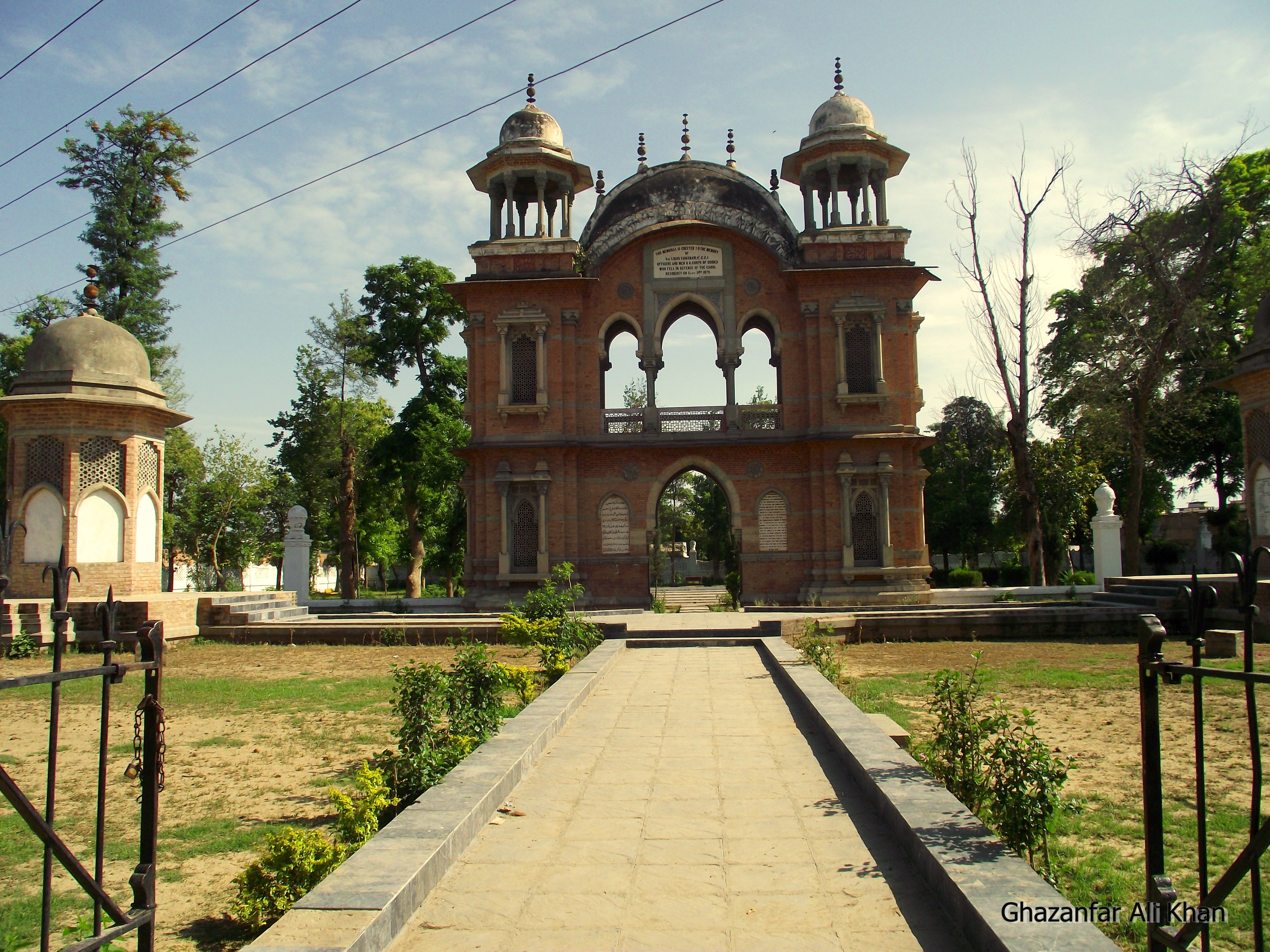
Guides Memorial

During the Sepoy Mutiny of 1857, Mardan was not a scene of heavy fighting as many of the native troops had been disarmed by British forces. Mardan's famous Guides' Memorial was established in 1892 to honour fallen soldiers who fought during the 1879 Siege of the British Residency in Kabul. The city's Women's Hospital was established in 1906. In 1920, Mardan was visited by Sir Charles Monro, head of British armed forces in British India. Until 1937, Mardan District was a part of Peshawar District, when it was elevated to the status of its own independent district. During the Viceroy's visit in 1946, large numbers of Mardan residents travelled to Peshawar to participate in a Muslim League rally in favour of Pakistan's establishment. The Mardan Museum was established in 1991 to showcase the region's rich ancient history.

In July 2020, life size statues of the Buddha was found during construction activity in the Mardan area. However, local Muslim civilians from the area took it on their own hands to destroy these findings. The culprits also posted their vandalism on social media, which resulted on their arrest by the Pakistani authorities. The findings are part of the ancient Indian Buddhist past of the area and related to the Gandhara Mahajanapada.

== Geography ==
Mardan is located in the south-west of the district at latitude 34°12'0 N and longitude 72°1'60 E and at an altitude of 283 metres (928 ft). Mardan is the district headquarters of Mardan District of Khyber Pakhtunkhwa. Risalpur is located to the south, Charsadda is located to the west, Yar Hussain to the east and Takht Bahi and Katlang to the north.

=== Climate ===
With an influence from the local steppe climate, Mardan features a hot semi-arid climate (Köppen BSh). The average temperature in Mardan is 22.2 °C, while the annual precipitation averages 559 mm. October is the driest month with an average rainfall of 12 mm, while the wettest month is August, with an average 122 mm of precipitation.

June is the hottest month of the year with an average temperature of 33.2 °C. The coldest month January has an average temperature of 10.0 °C.

Climate data for Mardan
| Month | Jan | Feb | Mar | Apr | May | Jun | Jul | Aug | Sep | Oct | Nov | Dec | Year |
|---|---|---|---|---|---|---|---|---|---|---|---|---|---|
| Mean daily maximum °C (°F) | 17.7 (63.9) | 19.0 (66.2) | 24.0 (75.2) | 30.1 (86.2) | 36.3 (97.3) | 41.4 (106.5) | 38.5 (101.3) | 36.5 (97.7) | 35.3 (95.5) | 31.6 (88.9) | 25.1 (77.2) | 19.4 (66.9) | 29.6 (85.2) |
| Daily mean °C (°F) | 10.0 (50.0) | 12.2 (54.0) | 17.2 (63.0) | 22.7 (72.9) | 28.2 (82.8) | 33.2 (91.8) | 32.3 (90.1) | 31.0 (87.8) | 28.8 (83.8) | 23.2 (73.8) | 16.2 (61.2) | 11.0 (51.8) | 22.2 (71.9) |
| Mean daily minimum °C (°F) | 2.3 (36.1) | 5.5 (41.9) | 10.4 (50.7) | 15.3 (59.5) | 20.2 (68.4) | 25.1 (77.2) | 26.2 (79.2) | 25.5 (77.9) | 22.3 (72.1) | 14.9 (58.8) | 7.4 (45.3) | 2.7 (36.9) | 14.8 (58.7) |
| Average precipitation mm (inches) | 47 (1.9) | 53 (2.1) | 67 (2.6) | 44 (1.7) | 20 (0.8) | 17 (0.7) | 88 (3.5) | 122 (4.8) | 45 (1.8) | 12 (0.5) | 14 (0.6) | 30 (1.2) | 559 (22.2) |
Source: Climate-Data.org

== Demographics ==
Historical Population

| Year | Pop. | ±% p.a. |
|---|---|---|
| 1951 | 48,827 | — |
| 1961 | 77,932 | +4.79% |
| 1972 | 115,194 | +3.62% |
| 1981 | 147,977 | +2.82% |

| Year | Pop. | ±% p.a. |
|---|---|---|
| 1998 | 245,926 | +3.03% |
| 2017 | 358,604 | +2.01% |
| 2023 | 368,302 | +0.45% |

Mardan is the de facto headquarters of the Yousafzai tribe of Pashtuns with a significant number of Mohmand, Utmankhel, Tareen, Awan, and Khalil tribe members have settled in the city over the years. The population of Mardan city over the years is shown in the table below.

According to the 2023 Census of Pakistan, the city of Mardan had 368,302 inhabitants, making it the second-largest city in Khyber Pakhtunkhwa. These inhabitants were spread out among 51,429 households, making the average household size in Mardan 7.89. Mardan experienced explosive growth throughout the latter half of the twentieth century, as the population of Mardan grew fivefold in just 50 years. The city's growth has, though, over time, slowed down by quite a bit, and between the years of 1998 and 2017, its population only grew at about 2% every year.

Religious groups in Mardan City (1881−2017) (Note: 1881-1941: Data for the entirety of the town of Mardan, which included Mardan Municipality and Mardan Cantonment.)
| Religious group | 1881 | | 1901 | | 1911 | | 1921 | | 1931 | | 1941 | | 2017 | |
| Religious group | Pop. | % | Pop. | % | Pop. | % | Pop. | % | Pop. | % | Pop. | % | Pop. | % |
|---|---|---|---|---|---|---|---|---|---|---|---|---|---|---|
| Islam | 1,616 | 58.42% | 1,569 | 43.92% | 5,477 | 61.34% | 5,890 | 53.89% | 19,579 | 74.5% | 30,301 | 71.31% | 356,580 | 99.32% |
| Hinduism (Note: 1931-1941: Including Ad-Dharmis) | 829 | 29.97% | 1,283 | 35.92% | 1,892 | 21.19% | 3,220 | 29.46% | 3,605 | 13.72% | 5,851 | 13.77% | 288 | 0.08% |
| Sikhism | 295 | 10.67% | 683 | 19.12% | 1,465 | 16.41% | 1,679 | 15.36% | 2,927 | 11.14% | 6,014 | 14.15% | —N/a | —N/a |
| Jainism | 0 | 0% | 0 | 0% | 0 | 0% | 0 | 0% | 0 | 0% | —N/a | —N/a | —N/a | —N/a |
| Christianity | —N/a | —N/a | 37 | 1.04% | 95 | 1.06% | 141 | 1.29% | 168 | 0.64% | 282 | 0.66% | 1,863 | 0.52% |
| Zoroastrianism | —N/a | —N/a | 0 | 0% | 0 | 0% | 0 | 0% | 0 | 0% | 0 | 0% | —N/a | —N/a |
| Judaism | —N/a | —N/a | 0 | 0% | 0 | 0% | 0 | 0% | 0 | 0% | 0 | 0% | —N/a | —N/a |
| Buddhism | —N/a | —N/a | 0 | 0% | 0 | 0% | 0 | 0% | 0 | 0% | —N/a | —N/a | —N/a | —N/a |
| Ahmadiyya | —N/a | —N/a | —N/a | —N/a | —N/a | —N/a | —N/a | —N/a | —N/a | —N/a | —N/a | —N/a | 141 | 0.04% |
| Others | 26 | 0.94% | 0 | 0% | 0 | 0% | 0 | 0% | 0 | 0% | 46 | 0.11% | 152 | 0.04% |
| Total population | 2,766 | 100% | 3,572 | 100% | 8,929 | 100% | 10,930 | 100% | 26,279 | 100% | 42,494 | 100% | 359,024 | 100% |

=== Languages ===
Languages of Mardan City (2023)
1. Pashto (98.1%)
2. Punjabi (0.74%)
3. Others (1.18%)

According to the 2023 Census of Pakistan, the population is overwhelmingly Pashto-speaking, with Pashto spoken by 98.08% of residents. Punjabi at 0.74% and Urdu at 0.71% form the largest minority languages, followed by 0.47% "Others" which speak other languages of Pakistan.

== Education ==
There was no public or private sector university in Mardan until 2009. The first public sector university, Abdul Wali Khan University Mardan was established in 2009. In 2016, a public sector women university Women University Mardan started functioning while in 2017, University of Engineering and Technology, Peshawar Mardan campus was upgraded to full-fledge university and named University of Engineering and Technology Madan.

Bacha Khan Medical College, Mardan, which was established in 2010, is the city's only medical college. There is also a campus of University of Agriculture, Peshawar, which is named as Agriculture university Ameer Mohammad Khan Campus Mardan.

There are also two Postgraduate colleges in Mardan, one for boys and girls each. Government Post Graduate College Mardan, which was established in 1952 while Government Post Graduate College for Women Mardan was established in 1963.

There are numerous public and private schools and colleges for boys and girls in Mardan. Among them, the most renowned and famous is Fazal e Haq College, Mardan.

== Economy ==
Mardan is part of a growing industrial centre, and is home to textile and edible oil mills, as well as one of the largest sugar mills in South Asia. An economic zone is planned as a part of the multi-billion dollar China-Pakistan Economic Corridor (CPEC) near Rashakai. Although Rashakai is part of Nowshera District, its proximity with Mardan is expected to directly benefit the city.

== Sports ==
In 2006, Mardan District government with the help of Government of Pakistan created a sports complex in Mardan city. The complex Mardan Sports Complex, has facilities for all major sports such as cricket, football, field hockey, swimming, and basketball. The swimming pool facility was built in 2011 while an international standard hockey turf was constructed at the sports complex at the cost of Rs. 67.69 million in 2016.

== See also ==
- List of cities in Khyber Pakhtunkhwa by population
- Mardan Division
- Mardan District
- Mardan Tehsil
