= Jehanzeb Khalil =

Pakistani academic

- Education: University of Peshawar
- Scientific career
- Fields: Political Science
- Workplaces: Abdul Wali Khan University Mardan

Jehanzeb Khalil is a Pakistani academic, currently serving as Pro-Vice-Chancellor of Abdul Wali Khan University Mardan. He has also served as dean at the Hazara University and dean of Social Sciences at Abdul Wali Khan University Mardan. Khalil has got PhD in Pakistan Studies from the University of Peshawar. He is also a faculty member of the political science department at Abdul Wali Khan University Mardan.

Academic offices
New office	Pro-Voice Chancellor of the Abdul Wali Khan University Mardan; May 12, 2017	Incumbent
