= George Pușcaș =

Romanian footballer (born 1996)

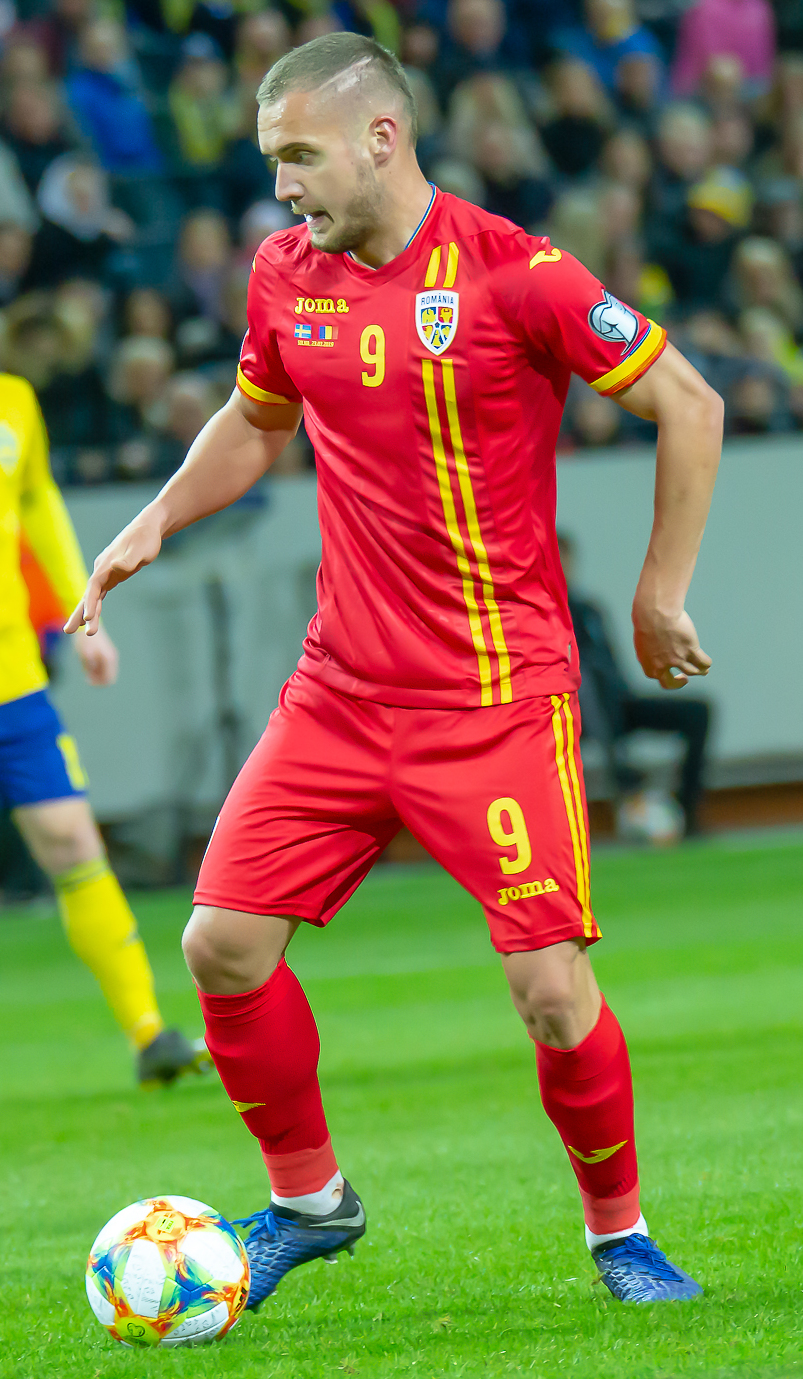
- Pușcaș with Romania in 2019

Personal information
- Full name: George Alexandru Pușcaș
- Date of birth: 8 April 1996 (age 30)
- Place of birth: Marghita, Romania
- Height: 1.88 m (6 ft 2 in)
- Position: Forward

Team information
- Current team: Dinamo București
- Number: 47

Youth career
- 2008–2012: Liberty Oradea
- 2013–2014: → Inter Milan (loan)

Senior career*
Years	Team	Apps	(Gls)
2012–2013	Bihor Oradea	13	(2)
2014–2018	Inter Milan	4	(0)
2015–2016	→ Bari (loan)	16	(4)
2016–2018	→ Benevento (loan)	28	(5)
2018	→ Novara (loan)	19	(9)
2018–2019	Palermo	33	(9)
2019	Inter Milan	0	(0)
2019–2023	Reading	84	(17)
2022	→ Pisa (loan)	18	(8)
2022–2023	→ Genoa (loan)	25	(4)
2023–2024	Genoa	8	(0)
2024	→ Bari (loan)	15	(4)
2024–2025	Bodrum	34	(8)
2026–	Dinamo București	7	(1)

International career^{‡}
2011–2012	Romania U17	5	(0)
2014	Romania U19	9	(5)
2014–2019	Romania U21	25	(18)
2018–	Romania	46	(11)
- * Club domestic league appearances and goals as of 16 May 2026 ‡ National team caps and goals as of 12 October 2024

George Alexandru Pușcaș (Romanian pronunciation: [ˈdʒe̯ordʒe alekˈsandru ˈpuʃkaʃ]; born 8 April 1996) is a Romanian professional footballer who plays as a forward for Liga I club Dinamo București.

== Club career ==
=== Inter Milan ===
Pușcaș made his Internazionale debut on 1 February 2015 by appearing in the last minutes of a 3–1 loss to Sassuolo in the 2014–15 Serie A matchday 21. On 26 February 2015, he made his UEFA Europa League debut as a substitute replacing Rodrigo Palacio in the 89th minute of a 1–0 home win over Celtic. On 4 April 2014, Pușcaș played his first match as a starter for Internazionale, a 1–1 home draw against Parma, he was replaced by Mateo Kovačić in the 46th minute.

==== Various loans ====
On 4 August 2015, Pușcaș, along with his teammate Gaston Camara, were sent on loan at Serie B for the 2015–16 season. On 9 August he made his debut for Bari as a substitute replacing Anthony Partipilo in the 60th minute of a 2–1 home defeat against Foggia in the second round of Coppa Italia. He played his first Serie B match later on 22 September 2015 in the 4–1 away loss to Crotone, starting and playing for 57 minutes. On 22 February he played his first entire match for Bari, a 1–0 away defeat against Virtus Lanciano. On 1 March, Pușcaș scored twice in a 4–0 home win over Ternana. Pușcaș ended his loan to Bari with 18 appearances, 5 goals and 1 assist.

On 15 July, Pușcaș was loaned to Serie B side Benevento on a two-year loan deal. On 7 August he made his debut in a match loss 4–2 at penalties after a 0–0 home draw against Salernitana in the second round of Coppa Italia; he was replaced by Fabio Mazzeo in the 68th minute. On 27 August he made his Serie B debut for Benevento as a substitute replacing Fabio Ceravolo in the 71st minute and scoring his first goal eight minutes later in a 2–0 home win over SPAL. On 20 September he played his first entire match for Benevento, a 1–1 home draw against Pro Vercelli. On 19 November, Pușcaș scored his second goal, again as a substitute, in the 89th minute of a 4–0 home win over Brescia. In June 2017 he scored the goal that sealed Benevento's promotion to Serie A.

Pușcaș started his second season with Benevento by playing 80 minutes in a 4–0 home defeat against Perugia in the third round of Coppa Italia. On 20 August, Pușcaș made his Serie A debut for Benevento in a 2–1 away defeat against Sampdoria. On 3 December 2017, Pușcaș scored his first Serie A goal in the 2–2 home draw versus Milan that gave Benevento their first ever point in the top flight. In January 2018 he was recalled by Inter, thus leaving Benevento with a total of 34 appearances and 8 goals.

On 29 January 2018, Pușcaș was again sent on loan, this time returning at Serie B to Novara. He debuted for his new team five days later in the 2–1 home defeat to Ascoli, netting his team's only goal in the first half. The following week, in his second appearance, Pușcaș scored his first career hat-trick to give his side the 3–1 win at Cittadella.

=== Palermo ===
On 8 August 2018, Pușcaș joined Palermo and subsequently signed a four-year contract. The deal was reported to be worth €3.25 million plus bonuses. On 3 November 2018, he registered his first league goal for the Sicilian team by scoring in the 90th minute of a 2–1 victory over Cosenza. At the end of the season, with Palermo relegated to Serie D, Internazionale exercised their buy back option for the Romanian forward.

=== Reading ===
On 7 August 2019, Pușcaș signed for Reading on a five-year contract from Inter Milan for €7.5 million plus €2 million in bonuses, becoming Reading's most expensive signing in history. He scored his first goal for Reading in an EFL Cup tie against Wycombe Wanderers on 13 August 2019, and also went on to score one of the penalties as Reading won the shoot-out. On 18 August 2019, he scored two goals on his home league debut for the Royals against Cardiff City. Pușcaș scored his first EFL Championship hat-trick against Wigan Athletic on 30 November 2019 in a 3–1 victory, with the goals all coming in the space of 4 minutes 54 seconds.

==== Loan to Pisa ====
On 31 January 2022, Pușcaș returned to Italy, joining Pisa on loan with a conditional obligation to buy.

==== Genoa ====
On 25 August 2022, Pușcaș moved on a new Italian loan at Genoa. At the end of the season, Pușcaș was signed on permanent basis by Genoa. The agreed buying fee from Reading was €1.8 million.

On 19 January 2024, Pușcaș returned to Bari in Serie B on loan.

== International career ==
Because of his Hungarian ancestry, Pușcaș could have represented Hungary via naturalisation. In 2013, the then-Hungarian head coach Sándor Egervári went to watch him play in the Romanian second division, but gave up on him by saying that there are already players of his ability in Hungary.

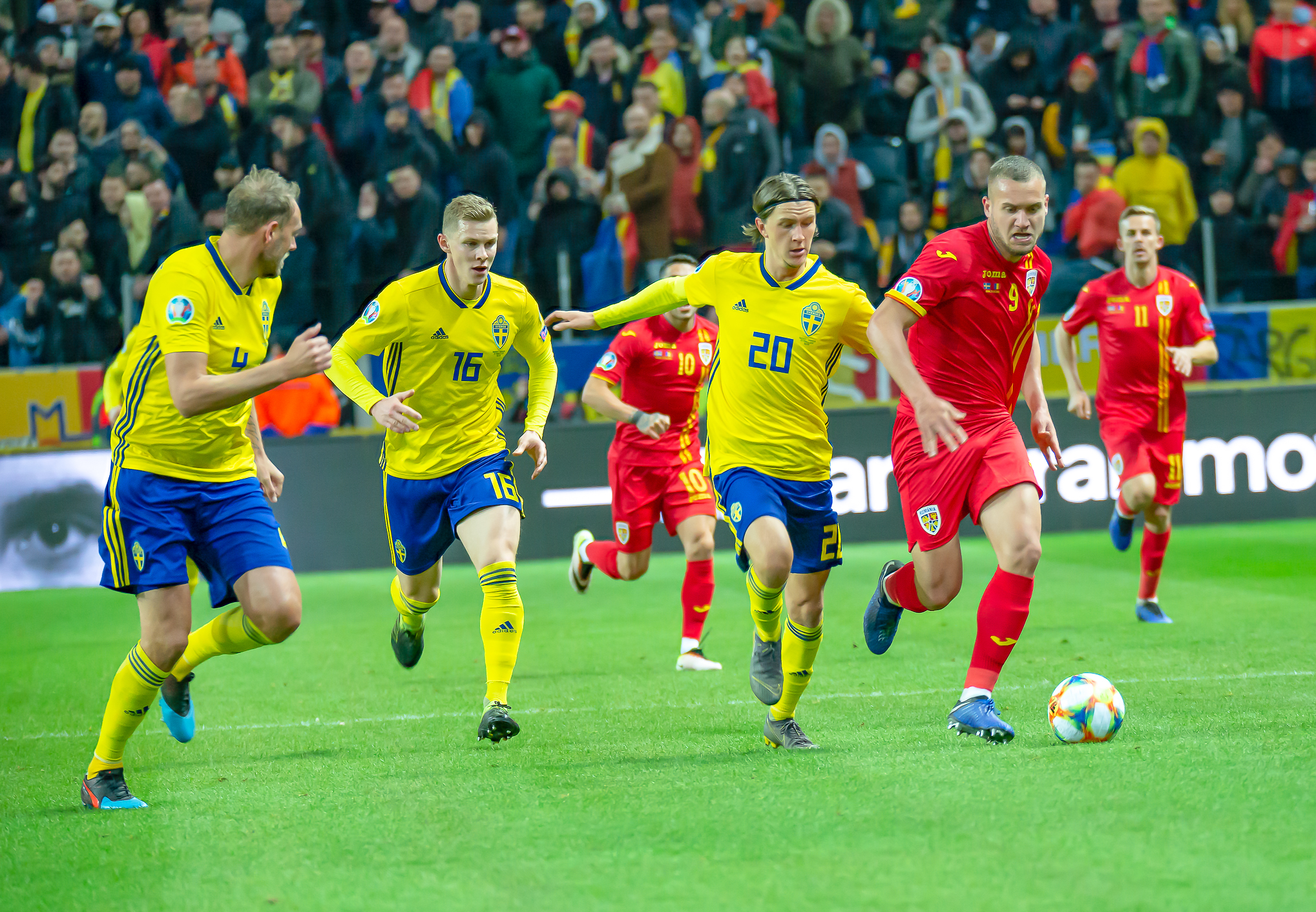
Pușcaș (No. 9) in action during a UEFA Euro 2020 qualifying match against Sweden on 26 March 2019.

Pușcaș scored seven times for Romania under-21 in the 2019 UEFA European Championship qualifiers, as his side won its group and progressed to the final tournament in Italy. On 18 June 2019, he obtained the penalty from which he scored the opener in a 4–1 victory over Croatia. He netted again in the next group game against England, surpassing Ionuț Luțu as the highest scorer of the Tricolorii mici. Pușcaș then gave Romania a half-time lead after scoring a double against Germany in the semi-finals, but Romania eventually lost the match 4–2.

Pușcaș earned his first full cap for Romania on 23 May 2018, entering in the 74th minute of a 3–2 win against Chile. On 17 November that year, he scored his first goal in a 3–0 UEFA Nations League defeat of Lithuania.

== Personal life ==
Born in Marghita, Pușcaș is of partial Hungarian descent and can understand the Hungarian language. His family name, Pușcaș, originates from the Hungarian Puskás.

== Career statistics ==
=== Club ===
As of match played 16 May 2026

Appearances and goals by club, season and competition
Club	Season	League			National cup (Note: Includes Coppa Italia, FA Cup, Turkish Cup, Cupa României)		EFL Cup		Continental		Other		Total	
Club	Season	Division	Apps	Goals	Apps	Goals	Apps	Goals	Apps	Goals	Apps	Goals	Apps	Goals
Bihor Oradea	2012–13	Liga II	13	2	0	0	—		—		—		13	2
Inter Milan	2014–15	Serie A	4	0	2	0	—		1 (Note: Appearance in UEFA Europa League)	0	—		7	0
Bari (loan)	2015–16	Serie B	16	4	1	0	—		—		1 (Note: Appearances in Serie B promotion play-offs)	1	18	5
Benevento (loan)	2016–17	Serie B	17	4	1	0	—		—		4	3	22	7
Benevento (loan)	2017–18	Serie A	11	1	1	0	—		—		—		12	1
Benevento (loan)	Total		28	5	2	0	—		—		4	3	34	8
Novara (loan)	2017–18	Serie B	19	9	0	0	—		—		—		19	9
Palermo	2018–19	Serie B	33	9	0	0	—		—		—		33	9
Reading	2019–20	Championship	38	12	2	1	2	1	—		—		42	14
Reading	2020–21	Championship	21	4	0	0	1	0	—		—		22	4
Reading	2021–22	Championship	25	1	1	1	1	0	—		—		27	2
Reading	Total		84	17	3	2	4	1	—		—		91	20
Pisa (loan)	2021–22	Serie B	18	8	—		—		—		4	0	22	8
Genoa (loan)	2022–23	Serie B	25	4	2	0	—		—		—		27	4
Genoa	2023–24	Serie A	8	0	2	0	—		—		—		10	0
Bari (loan)	2023–24	Serie B	15	4	—		—		—		2 (Note: Appearances in Serie B relegation play-outs)	0	17	4
Bodrum	2024–25	Süper Lig	34	8	4	3	—		—		—		38	11
Dinamo București	2025–26	Liga I	7	1	1	0	—		—		0	0	8	1
Dinamo București	2026–27	Liga I	0	0	0	0	—		—		—		0	0
Dinamo București	Total		7	1	1	0	—		—		0	0	8	1
Career total			304	71	17	5	4	1	1	0	11	4	337	81

=== International ===
As of match played 12 October 2024

Appearances and goals by national team and year
National team	Year	Apps	Goals
Romania
Romania	2018	4	1
Romania	2019	10	5
Romania	2020	6	2
Romania	2021	6	0
Romania	2022	8	2
Romania	2023	6	1
Romania	2024	6	0
Total		46	11

As of 18 November 2023
Scores and results list Romania's goal tally first, score column indicates score after each Pușcaș goal.

List of international goals scored by George Pușcaș
No.	Date	Venue	Cap	Opponent	Score	Result	Competition
1	17 November 2018	Stadionul Ilie Oană, Ploiești, Romania	3	Lithuania	1–0	3–0	2018–19 UEFA Nations League C
2	26 March 2019	Stadionul Dr. Constantin Rădulescu, Cluj-Napoca, Romania	6	Faroe Islands	4–1	4–1	UEFA Euro 2020 qualification
3	10 June 2019	National Stadium, Ta' Qali, Malta	8	Malta	1–0	4–0	UEFA Euro 2020 qualification
4	10 June 2019	National Stadium, Ta' Qali, Malta	8	Malta	2–0	4–0	UEFA Euro 2020 qualification
5	8 September 2019	Stadionul Ilie Oană, Ploiești, Romania	10	Malta	1–0	1–0	UEFA Euro 2020 qualification
6	12 October 2019	Tórsvøllur, Tórshavn, Faroe Islands	11	Faroe Islands	1–0	3–0	UEFA Euro 2020 qualification
7	4 September 2020	Arena Națională, Bucharest, Romania	15	Northern Ireland	1–0	1–1	2020–21 UEFA Nations League B
8	11 November 2020	Stadionul Ilie Oană, Ploiești, Romania	20	Belarus	4–0	5–3	Friendly
9	26 September 2022	Stadionul Rapid-Giulești, Bucharest, Romania	32	Bosnia and Herzegovina	2–0	4–1	2022–23 UEFA Nations League B
10	26 September 2022	Stadionul Rapid-Giulești, Bucharest, Romania	32	Bosnia and Herzegovina	4–1	4–1	2022–23 UEFA Nations League B
11	18 November 2023	Pancho Aréna, Felcsút, Hungary	39	Israel	1–1	2–1	UEFA Euro 2024 qualification

== Honours ==
Individual

- Gazeta Sporturilor Romanian Footballer of the Year runner-up: 2019
- UEFA European Under-21 Championship Silver Boot: 2019
- UEFA European Under-21 Championship Team of the Tournament: 2019
