= Mohammad Khurshid Khan =

Pakistani academic

- Education: University of Bradford
- Scientific career
- Fields: Mechanical Engineering
- Workplaces: University of Bradford (1990 - 2015); Abdul Wali Khan University Mardan (2017-2020)

Mohammad Khurshid Khan is a British Pakistani academic who was Vice-Chancellor of Abdul Wali Khan University Mardan. He is professor of Manufacturing Systems Engineering and Director for Student Recruitment (School of Engineering) at University of Bradford. He is on sabbatical from the University of Bradford and is the CEO of Feversham Education Trust (FET) in Bradford.

Khan received his BEng in 1983, Phd in 1987, and MBA degree in 1997 from the University of Bradford, UK.

Academic offices
Preceded by Ihsan Ali	Vice Chancellor of the Abdul Wali Khan University Mardan; 2017-2020	Incumbent
