= Abdul Ali Khan =

Pakistani educationist (1922–1997)

Abdul Ali Khan; عبدالعلي خان
- Born: August 20, 1922; Utmanzai, Charsadda, North-West Frontier Province, British India, now Khyber Pakhtunkhwa, Pakistan
- Died: February 19, 1997 (aged 74)
- Education: Peshawar University; University of Oxford
- Occupation: Educationist Reformer
- Relatives: Abdul Ghaffar Khan (father); Abdul Wali Khan (brother); Abdul Ghani Khan (brother); Zulfiqar Ali Khan (son)

Khan Abdul Ali Khan (Urdu: خان عبدالعلي خان; 20 August 1922 – 19 February 1997) was a Pathan educationist, former Principal of Islamia College Peshawar, The FazleHaq College Mardan, Aitchison College, former Vice Chancellor of Peshawar University, Gomal University and former Education Secretary of NWFP.

== Biography ==
Born into a political family, Abdul Ali Khan was the youngest son of Abdul Ghaffar Khan (Bacha Khan). He remained apolitical in his whole life. He was educated in Colonel Brown Cambridge School in Dehradun and completed his bachelor's degree from Peshawar University, before travelling to England to complete his postgraduate studies from the University of Oxford. He returned to Peshawar where he worked as a lecturer in history in Islamia College Peshawar. He subsequently served as Principal of Government college of Mianwali and Sargodha and was the principal of the elite Aitchison College Lahore from 1962 to 1970 before being appointed secretary education (1970–1972) in the North-West Frontier Province. He was then appointed Vice-Chancellor of Peshawar University and Gomal University. Eventually moving on to serve as Education secretary again before being appointed Principal of the newly established Fazle Haq College Mardan. He was a recipient of the Sitara-e-Imtiaz in 1997. He died in 1997 following a myocardial infarction.
