= University of Engineering and Technology =

University of Engineering and Technology may refer to:

== Bangladesh ==
- Bangladesh University of Engineering and Technology, Dhaka
- Bangladesh Army University of Engineering & Technology, Rajshahi
- Chittagong University of Engineering and Technology
- Dhaka University of Engineering & Technology, Gazipur
- Khulna University of Engineering and Technology
- Rajshahi University of Engineering and Technology

== India ==
- Jaypee University of Engineering and Technology, Madhya Pradesh

== Pakistan ==
- Balochistan University of Engineering and Technology, Khuzdar, Balochistan
- Dawood University of Engineering and Technology, Karachi, Sindh
- Mehran University of Engineering and Technology, Jamshoro, Sindh
- Muhammad Nawaz Sharif University of Engineering and Technology, Multan, Punjab
- NED University of Engineering and Technology, Karachi, Sindh
- Sir Syed University of Engineering and Technology, Karachi, Sindh
- University of Engineering and Technology, Lahore, Punjab
- University of Engineering and Technology, Mardan, Khyber-Pakhtunkhwa
- University of Engineering and Technology, Peshawar, Khyber-Pakhtunkhwa
- University of Engineering and Technology, Taxila, Punjab

== Peru ==
- University of Engineering and Technology (Peru), Lima
