= Women University Mardan =

University in Pakistan

Coordinates: 34°11′16.5″N 72°02′13.8″E

- Type: Public
- Established: 2016
- Founders: Prof Dr. Ghazala Yasmin
- Affiliations: Higher Education Commission of Pakistan
- Chancellor: Governor of Khyber Pakhtunkhwa
- Vice-Chancellor: Prof Dr. Ghazala Yasmin
- Location: Mardan, Khyber Pakhtunkhwa, Pakistan
- Website: www.wumardan.edu.pk

Women University Mardan is a public university situated in Mardan, Khyber Pakhtunkhwa, Pakistan. The university is run by the Government of Khyber Pakhtunkhwa and was founded in 2016.

== Overview and history ==
Women University Mardan was established as a result of popular demand from the people of the Mardan in 2012. Dr Ghazala Yasmeen was appointed as first Vice Chancellor of the university. The current Women University Mardan was basically the building of Abdul Wali Khan University Mardan which has been handed over to the administration along with requisite equipment and fixture. While a special ceremony was arranged in this regard which was attended by the AWKUM then Vice-Chancellor Prop.Dr. Ihsan Ali and Women University Vice-Chancellor Prof Dr Ghazala Yasmin, said a press release.

== Departments ==
Currently the university is operating following Departments.

- Department of Economics
- Department of English
- Department of Islamiyat
- Department of Management Science
- Department of Microbiology
- Department of Psychology
- Department of Human Nutrition and Dietatics
- Department of Zoology
- Department of Political Science
- Department of Physics
- Department of Urdu
- Department of Biotechnology

== See also ==
- Abdul Wali Khan University Mardan
- Women University Swabi
- Shaheed Benazir Bhutto Women University, Peshawar
