= Shahbaz Garhi =

Archaeological site in Mardan, Pakistan

- Location within Pakistan
- 34.235556°N 72.16°E
- Location: Pakistan
- Region: Khyber Pakhtunkhwa

Shahbaz Garhi, or Shahbazgarhi (شهباز ګړۍ), is a village and historic site located in Mardan District of Khyber Pakhtunkhwa, Pakistan. It is at an altitude of 293 metres.

It is about 12 km from Mardan city.

In olden times all these facilities made it attractive for the armies and travelers to set up (install) their tents here, stay for a few days and make their further strategy. The historic Stones of Ashoka (commonly known to the native people by the name of Hkule Gutt), and other sites like Mekha Sanda (female buffalo,male buffalo) are worth visiting.

== Location ==
Shahbaz Garhi is situated on the junction of three ancient routes;

1. Kabul to Pushkalavati (modern Charsadda)
2. Swat through Buner
3. Taxila through Hund on the bank of Indus River.

Situated on the modern Mardan-Swabi Road, the town was once a thriving Buddhist city surrounded by monasteries and stupas.

== Ancient rock edicts ==
=== Ashokan inscriptions ===
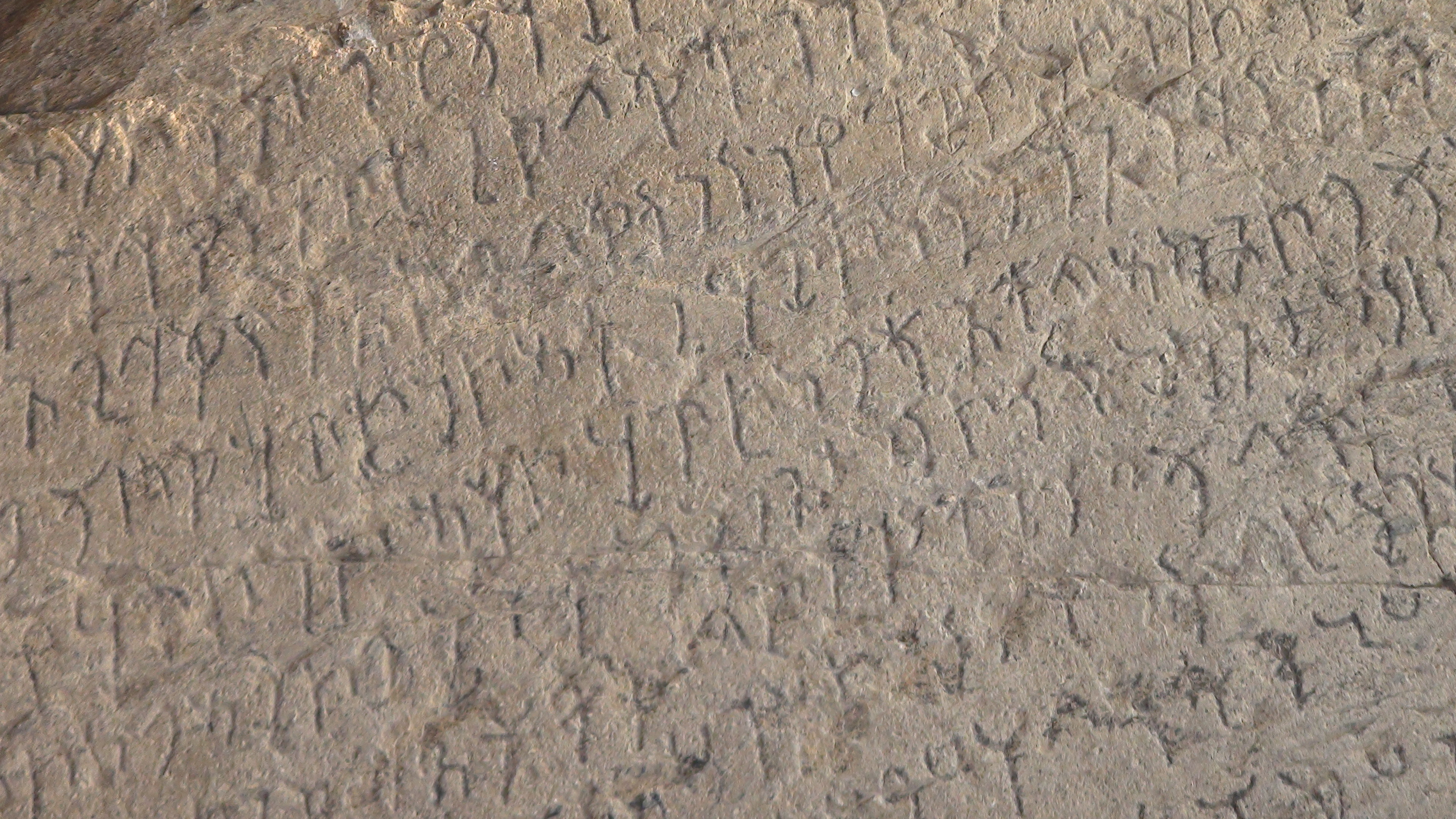
Detail of Edicts of Ashoka XII in Shahbazgarhi, Peshawar. Kharosthi script.

The town is the location of ancient Indian rock-inscriptions that are cut into two large rock boulders and written in the Kharosthi script. They retain immense historical importance, as they appear to be the first examples of writing in the subcontinent. They were constructed during the 3rd Century BC (272-231 BC), during the reign of Ashoka, the famous Mauryan emperor, inscribed in the Kharoshthi script. The rock edicts were added to the UNESCO World Heritage Tentative List on 30 January 2004 in the Cultural category.

The translation of the text is written on a board nearby the rocks. The site is a famous tourist spot for people who are interested in history.

The town is the location of ancient rock-inscriptions that are cut into two large rock boulders and written in the Kharosthi script. They retain immense historical importance, as they appear to be the first examples of writing in South Asia. They were constructed during the 3rd Century BC, during the reign of Ashoka, the famous Mauryan emperor. The rock edicts were added to the UNESCO World Heritage Tentative List on 30 January 2004 in the Cultural category.

=== gallery ===
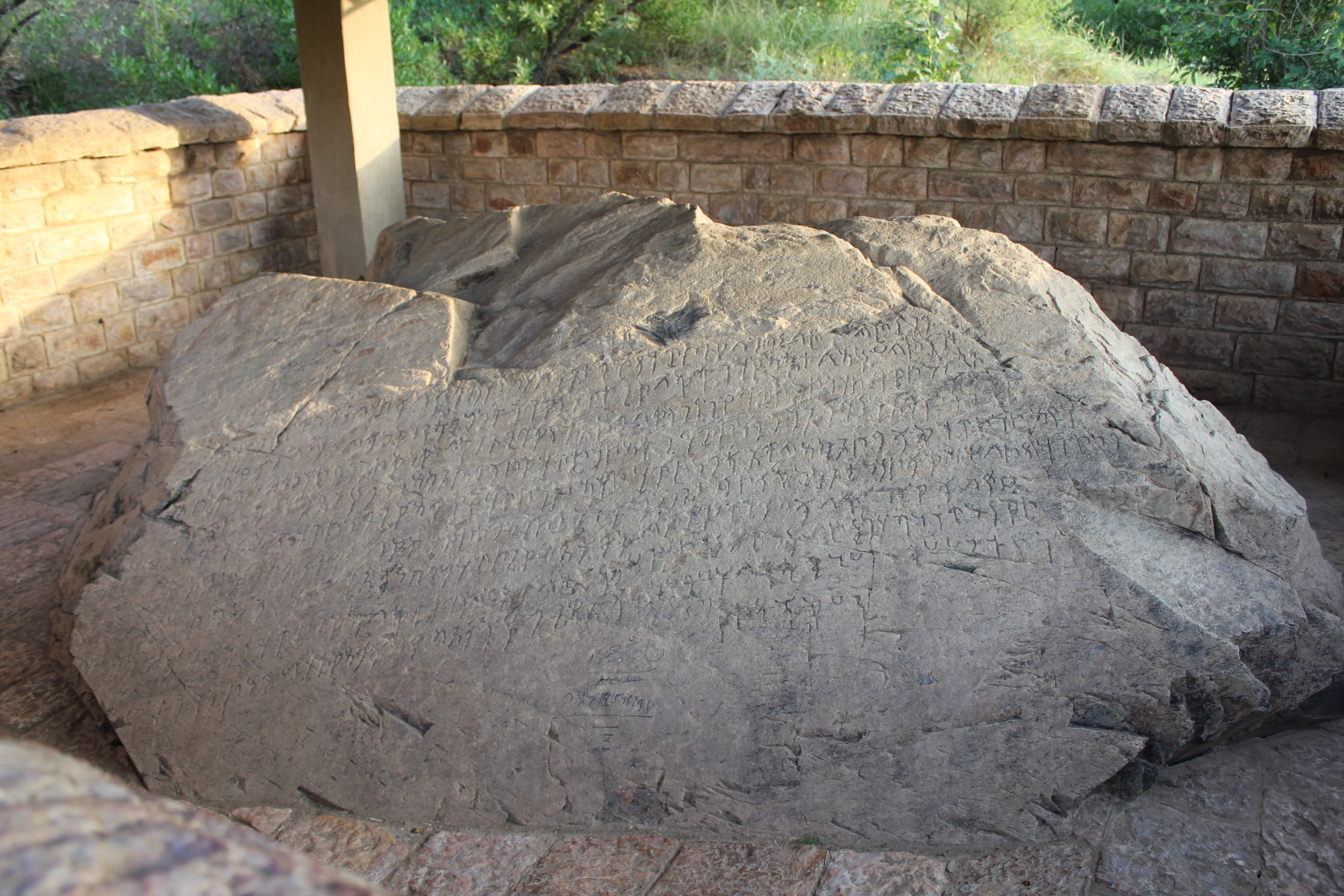
Edict No.12

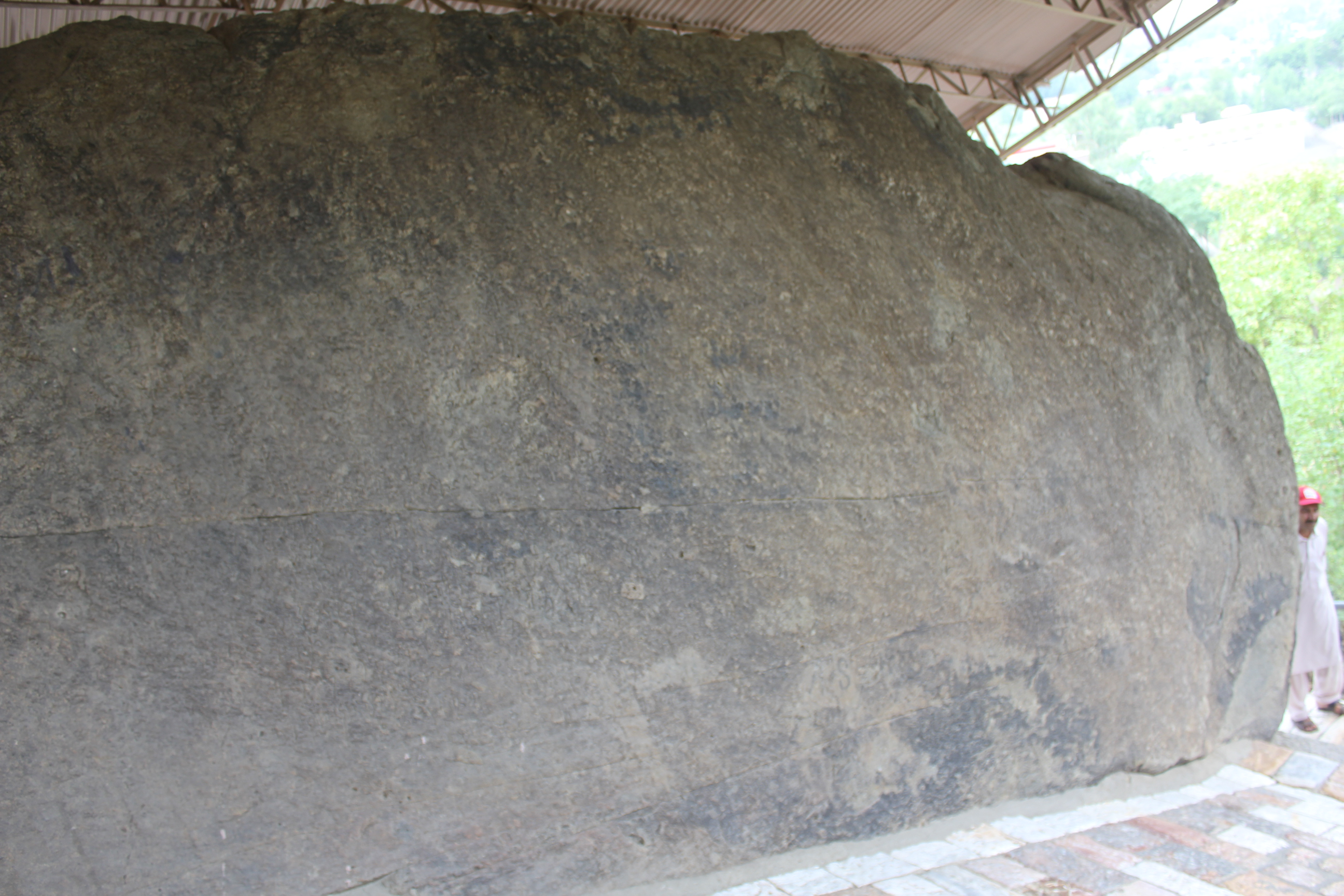
Edicts No.1 to No.11

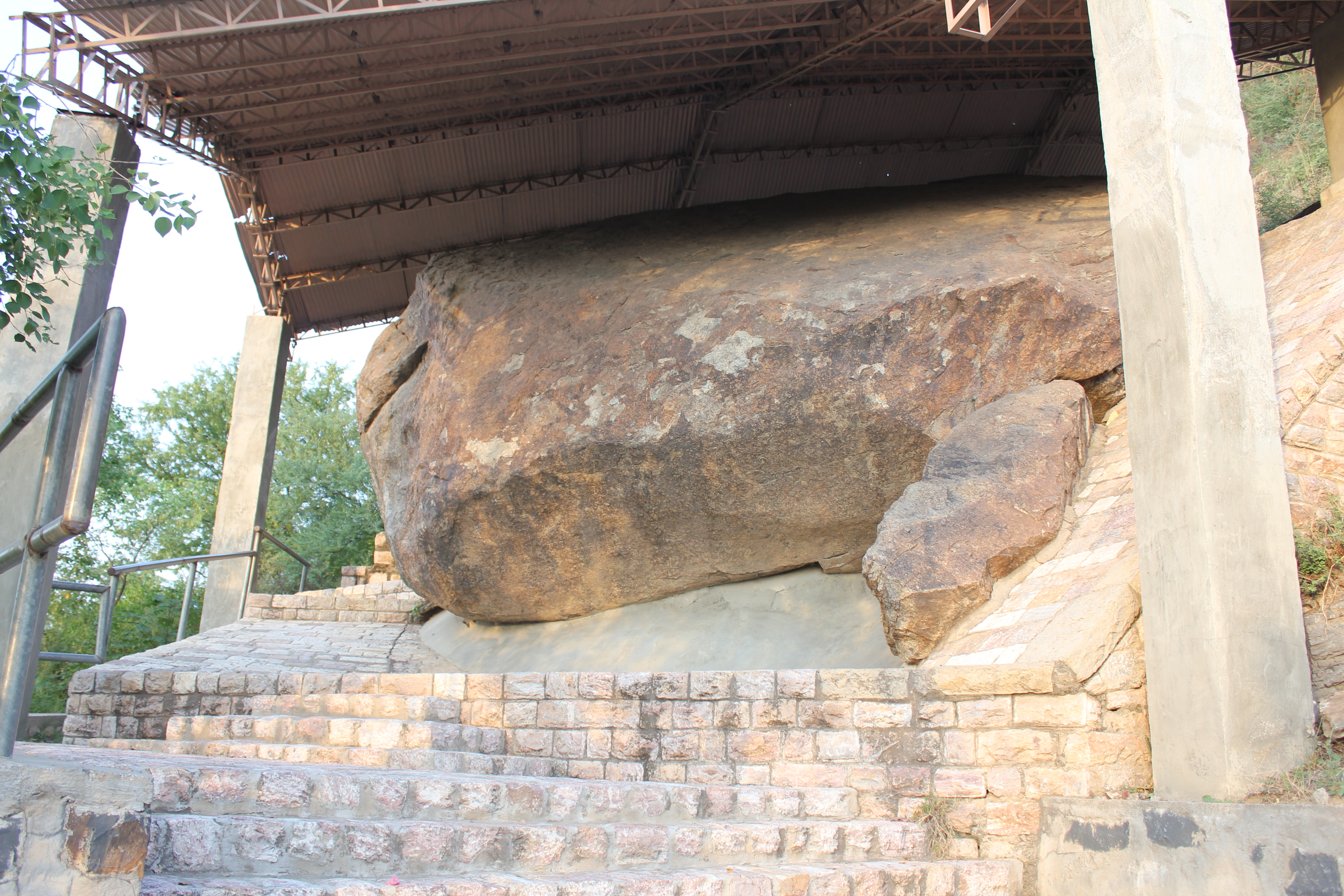
Edicts No.13 and No.14

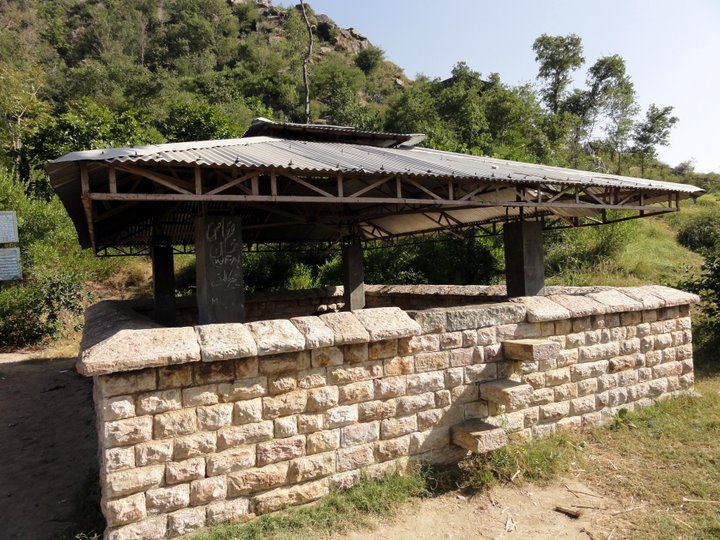
Protective housing

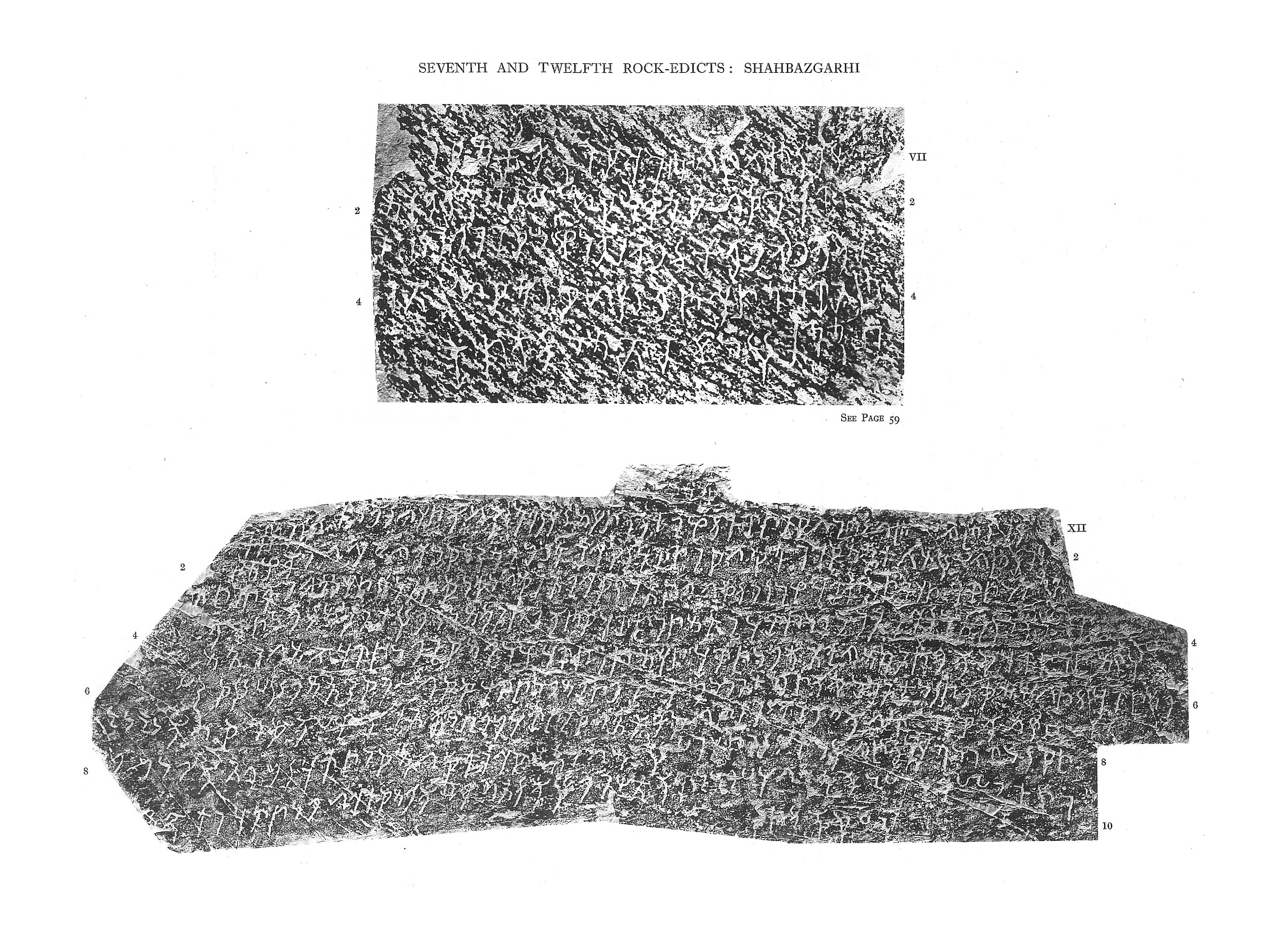
A rubbing of two of the inscriptions.

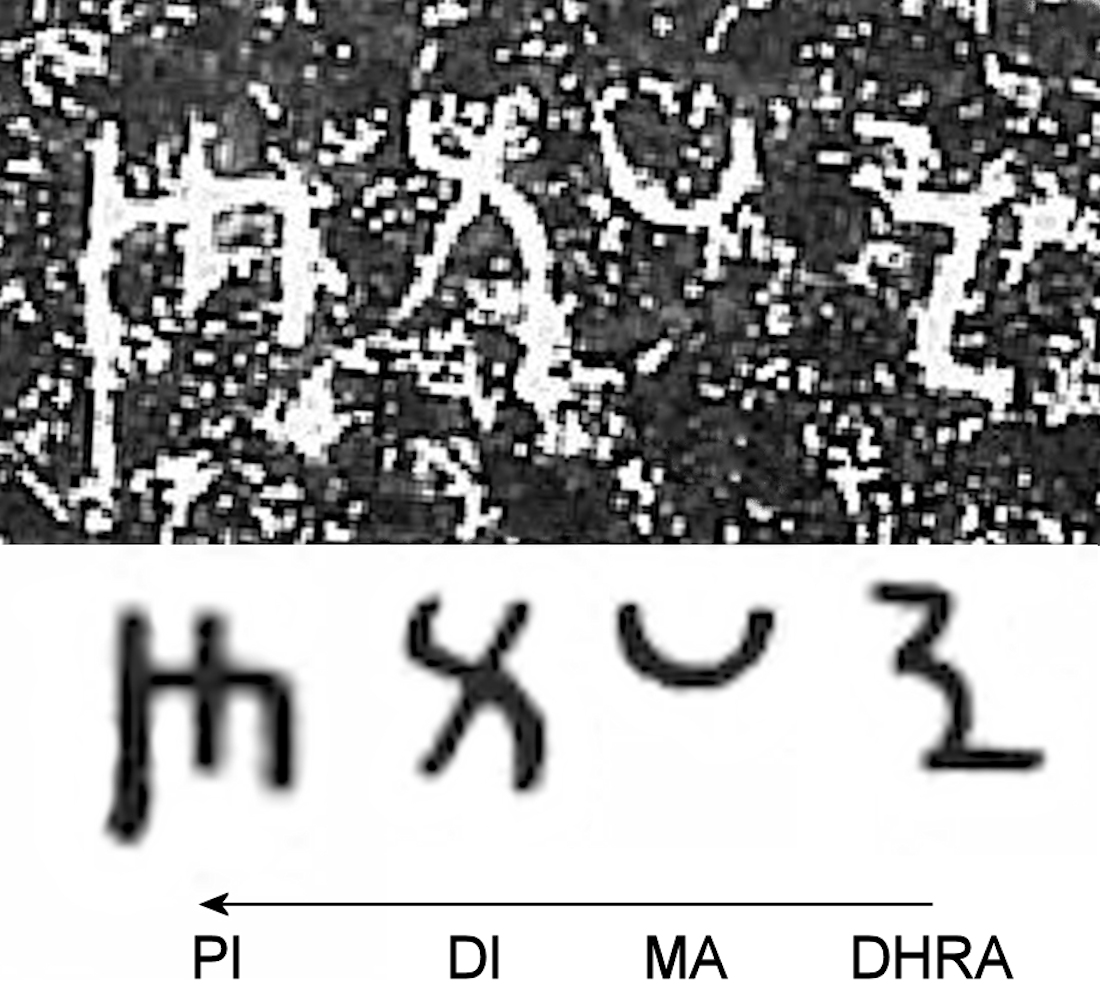
The words "Dhrama-Dipi" ("Inscription of the Dharma") in Kharosthi, in Edict No.1 of the Shahbazgarhi edicts.
