= Fazlehaq College =

Pakistani school

Coordinates: 34.1832°N 72.0098°E

The Fazlehaq College Mardan
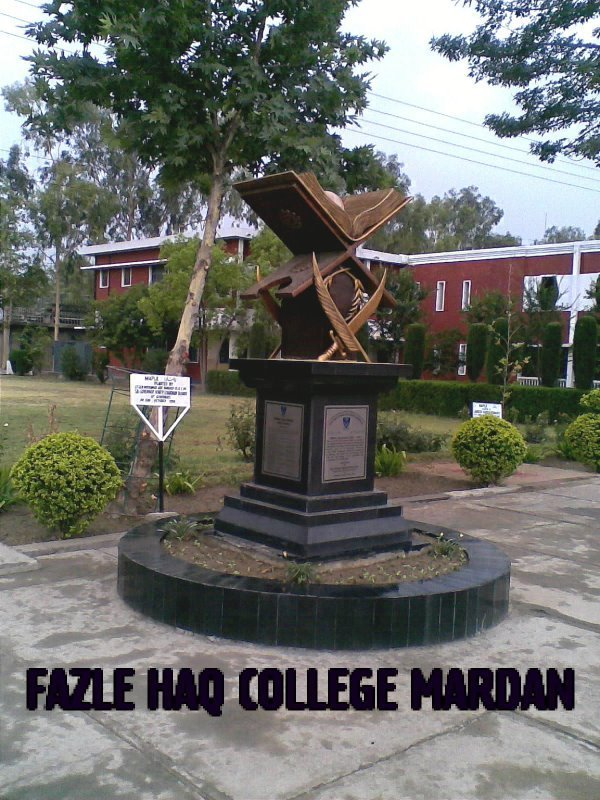
- Motto: Know Thyself
- Type: Public
- Established: 1983
- Principal: Hafsa ashfaq
- Location: Mardan, Khyber Pakhtunkhwa, Pakistan
- Campus: Urban
- Website: www.fcm.edu.pk

The Fazlehaq College Mardan is a residential college in Mardan, Pakistan. The students are called 'The 'HAQS', and the college motto is 'Know Thyself'.

== History ==
The college was founded in 1983 by General Fazle Haq, governor of Khyber Pakhtunkhwa and educationalist Abdul Ali Khan, son of politician Bacha Khan and brother of poet and philosopher Abdul Ghani Khan was its first principal. Classes began on May 2, 1985, under the leadership of Ali Khan. It is situated in 485 marla in District Mardan.

== Schools ==
The college is divided into three schools. These include the preparatory school, the junior school, the senior school and the girls school. Each school has its own head teacher, its own set of teaching staff and its own motto.

=== Preparatory school ===
The preparatory school includes students from P-0 through F-1, the equivalent of kindergarten through 6th grade. The head-mistress and the teaching staff are mostly female. The students of the preparatory school reside in hostels named Karlanr House and Abdali House, after the forefathers of the Pukhtoon that inhabit the area.

=== Junior school ===
The junior school includes students from F-2, F-3, M-1 and M2, the equivalent of 7th, 8th, 9th and 10th (Matric). Male teachers make up a majority of the teaching staff. Students reside in the Sir Sahibzada House, named after Sir Sahibzada Abdul Qayyum first Chief Minister of the Khyber-Pakhtunkhwa, and founder of the historic Islamia College and the University of Peshawar.

=== Senior school ===
The senior school has two streams of study: Intermediate Metric and GCE.

GCE, denoted as F-4 and F-5 (also equivalent to 9th and 10th grade) lead to the General Certificate of Education (GCE) Ordinary Level Examination.The college is officially registered with Cambridge.

The college offers intermediate classes for students after matriculation, equivalent to 11th and 12th grade, during which students can choose between pre-medical and pre-engineering courses. Different opportunities are given to these students for joining Pakistan Armed Forces.

Some of the students in the senior school reside in the Sher Shah Suri House, named after an Afghan warrior. Other students reside in Khushal House, named after the warrior poet Khushal Khan Khattak. These students stay in the house during class hours, returning home after classes.

=== Girls school ===
The girls school starts after preparatory school for girls. It has classes from F-2 (seventh grade) till Inter 2. Girls have their own separate 2 houses, Abdali and Jinnah house. They have a separate ground for sport activities.

== Student life ==
The Fazlehaq College Mardan provides sports and recreational facilities, including cricket and hockey grounds, two large swimming pools, a gymnasium with an indoor basketball court, squash courts, basketball and badminton courts, a boating pond, tennis lawns, softball and baseball pitches and a gymnastics squad. Additionally, there is a library and a museum for students. Computer, Physics, Chemistry and Biology labs are provided for students. There is also a biological museum for students.

Each student is required to join one of the many clubs and societies.

An annual picnic is held for the preparatory school and girls school. An annual 2–3 day hiking and camping trip for the junior and senior schools is hosted at different cadet/army schools. The Mountaineering Club also goes on a mountaineering exercise to the northern areas of Pakistan during summer vacation.

== Images ==
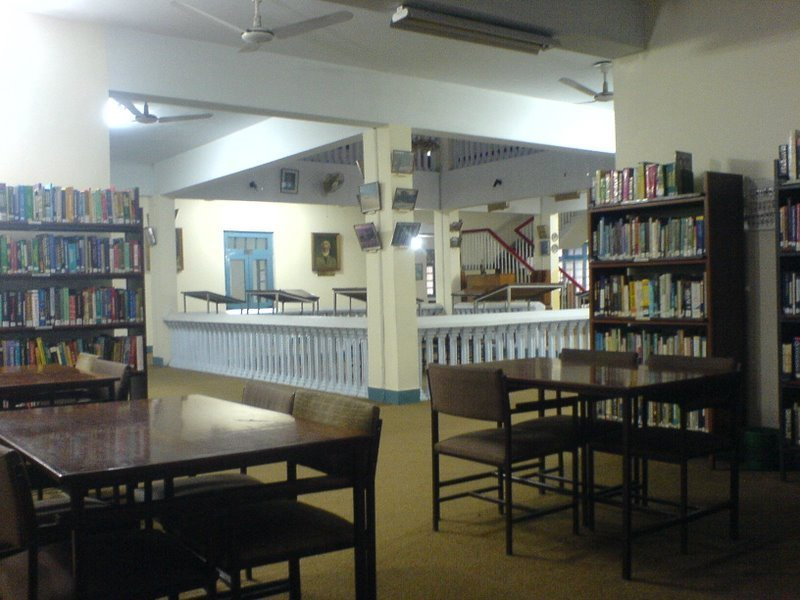
Library

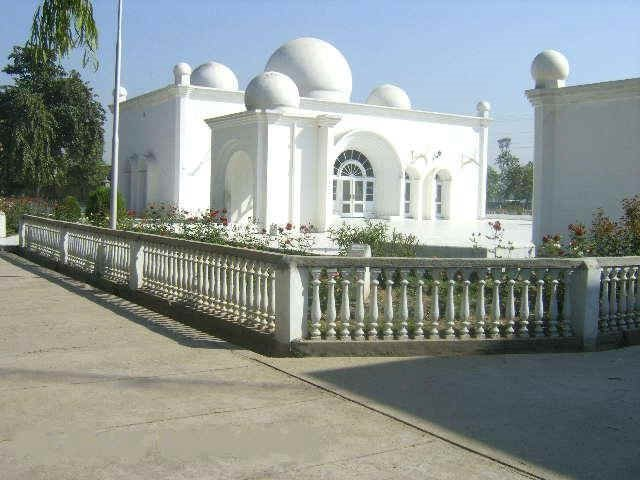
Mosque

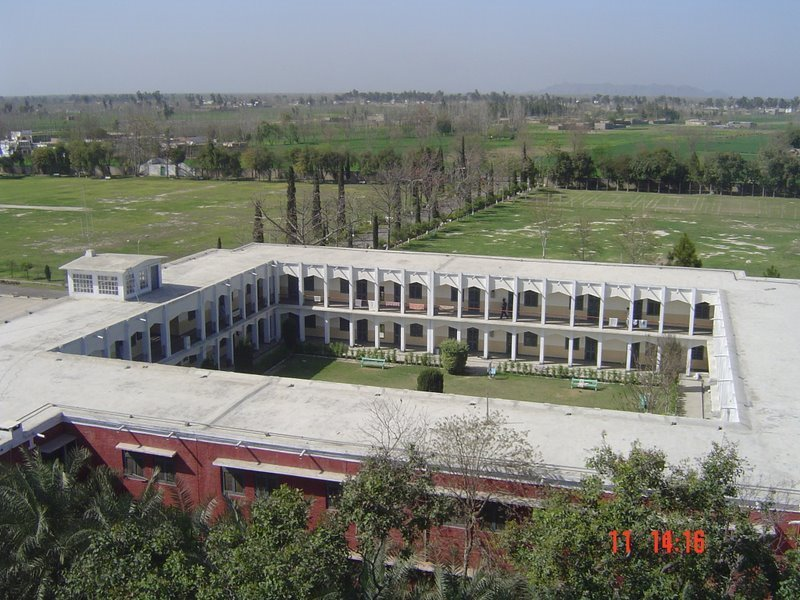
Sher Shah Suri House

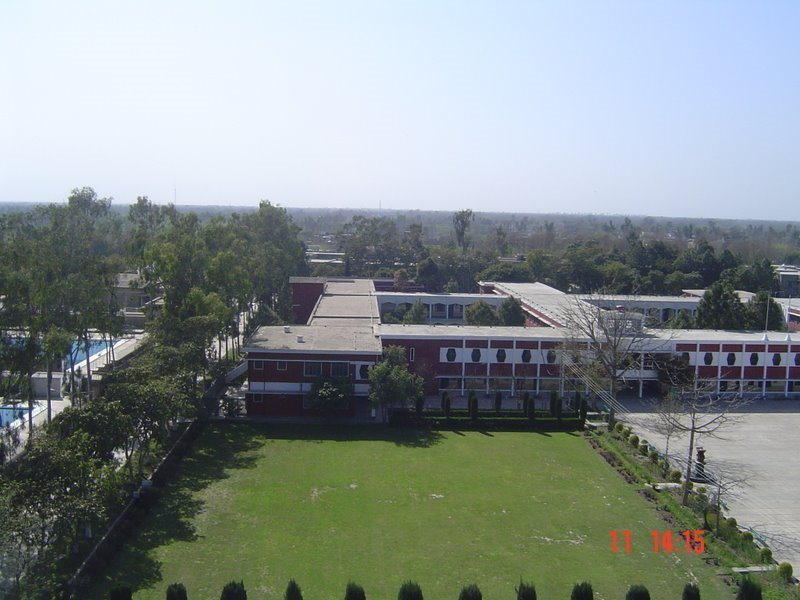
College

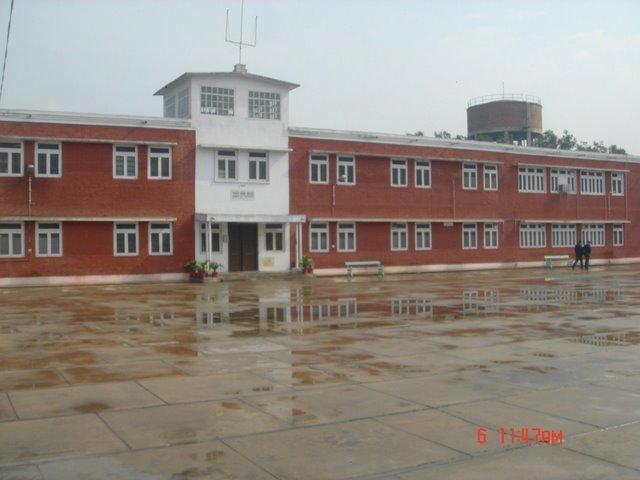
Sher Shah Suri House

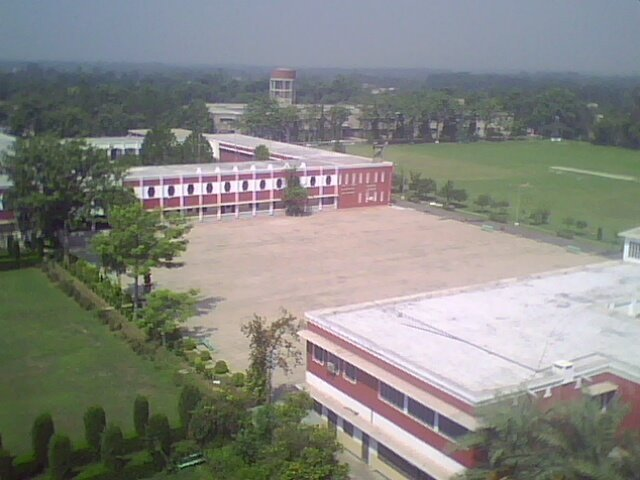
Main college square
