= Stan Puskas =

Czech footballer (born 1946)

Personal information
- Full name: Stanko Puskas
- Date of birth: 16 February 1946 (age 80)
- Place of birth: Czechoslovakia
- Position: Goalkeeper

Senior career*
Years	Team	Apps	(Gls)
1969–1970	London German Canadians		
1971	Montreal Olympique	1	(0)
1972	London German Canadians		
1973–1975	London City		
1976	Windsor Stars		
- * Club domestic league appearances and goals

Stan Puskas (born 16 February 1946) is a Czech former footballer who played as a goalkeeper.

== Career ==
Puskas played in the National Soccer League with London German Canadians. In 1971, he played in the North American Soccer League with Montreal Olympique. He made his debut for Montreal on 19 April 1971 against Atlanta Chiefs. After a season in the NASL he returned to former team London German Canadians, and managed to score a goal against the Serbian White Eagles FC. In 1973, he signed with league rivals London City.

He re-signed with London for the 1974 season, and for the 1975 season. In 1976, he played with the Windsor Stars.

== Personal life ==
Puskas was the nephew to Ferenc Puskás.
