= Sanghao Cave =

Cave and archaeological site in Pakistan

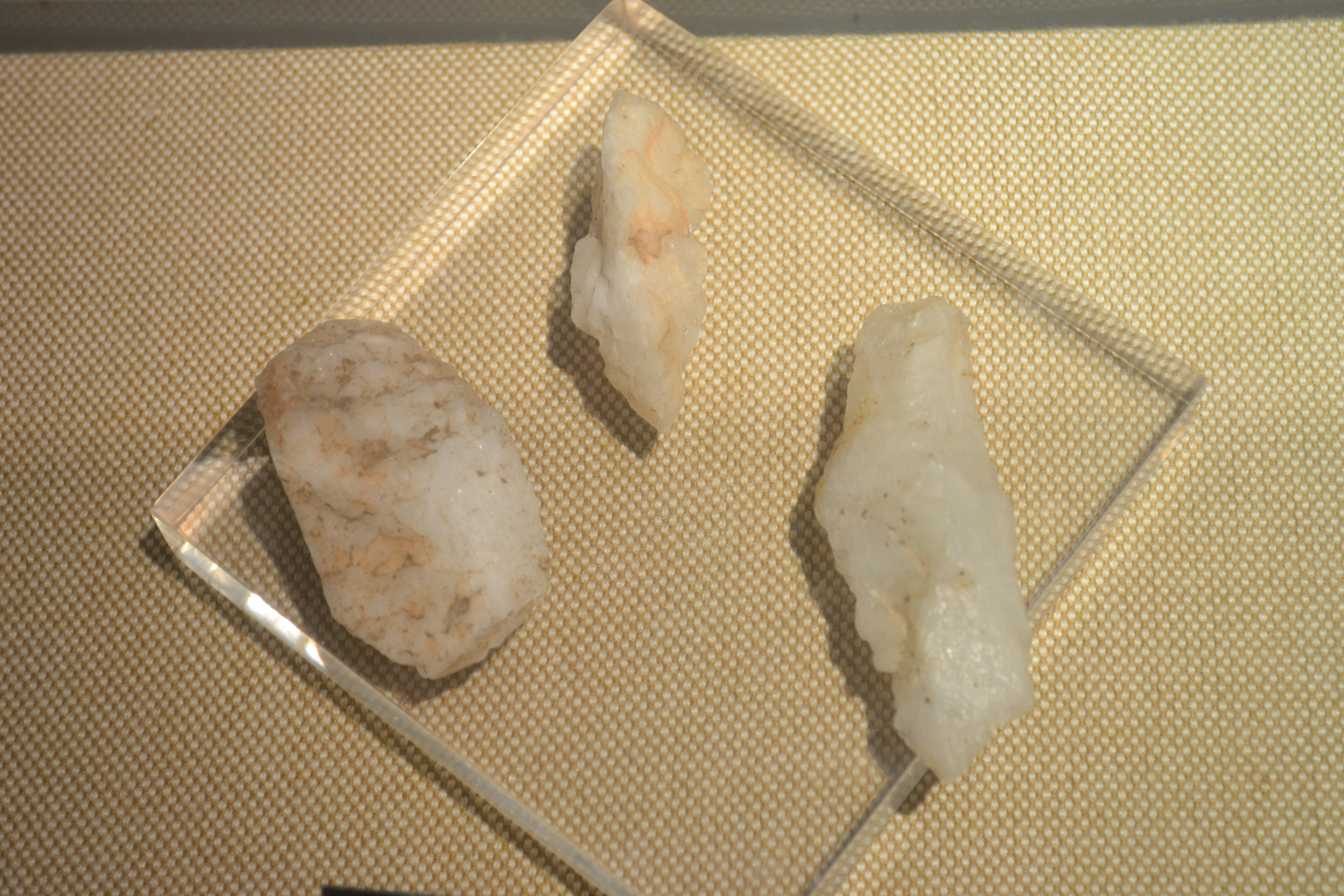
- Sanghao Cave Stone cutters

- location in Pakistan
- 34°3′23″N 71°32′44″E
- Location: near Peshawar
- Region: Mardan District, Khyber Pakhtunkhwa, Pakistan.

Sanghao Cave is a Paleolithic site, located on the Pothohar Plateau of Pakistan that was excavated by Ahmad Hasan Dani.

== Site ==
The cave is located near Peshawar in the Mardan District of northern Pakistan at an altitude of 600 m (2,000 ft). The cave is often referred as Parkho-darra.

== Discovery ==
Evidence of human activity in the Middle Palaeolithic has been reported from Sanghao Cave. The cave was excavated by Ahmad Hasan Dani in 1963. Chipped stone, bones, were found during the excavation. Other items included scrapers, quartz tools, blades, flakes, etc.

== See also ==
- Bhimbetka rock shelters
- Lithic analysis
