= Puskás =

Puskás is a Hungarian surname. The surname Puskás ultimately comes from the Old Slavic word puška (Cyrillic: пушка), which originally meant "gun", "firearm" or "rifle".

Notable people with the surname include:

- Ferenc Puskás (1927–2006), Hungarian football player and manager
  - FIFA Puskás Award, the player judged to have scored the most aesthetically significant and "most beautiful" goal of the year
  - Ferenc Puskás Stadium, former multi-purpose stadium in Budapest, Hungary
  - Puskás Akadémia FC, the young team of Videoton Football Club of Felcsút, Hungary
  - Puskás Cup, an international football tournament founded by the Puskás Akadémia FC
  - Puskás Ferenc Stadion (Budapest Metro), a station of the M2 (East-West) line of the Budapest Metro
  - Puskás Aréna, a stadium in Budapest, Hungary
- Tivadar Puskás (1844–1893), Hungarian inventor of the telephone exchange
- Tivadar Puskás (politician) (born 1952), Hungarian politician
- Ferenc Puskás I (1903–1952), Hungarian football player and manager, father of Ferenc Puskás
- Lajos Puskás (born 1944), Hungarian footballer
- Imre Puskás (born 1966), Hungarian jurist and politician
- Stan Puskas (born 1946), Czech footballer

== See also ==
- 82656 Puskás, main belt asteroid
- Pușcaș, Romanian surname
