= Ihsan Ali =

Pakistani archaeologist

Ihasan Ali
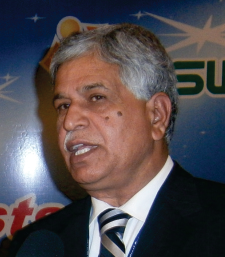
- Ihsan Ali while speaking to PTV at First International Sports Congress
- Born: 3 February 1955 (age 71); Charsadda, Khyber Pakhtunkhwa, Pakistan
- Education: University of Peshawar; University of Cambridge, UK
- Known for: Expert in the field of archaeology
- Awards: Sitara-i-Imtiaz
- Scientific career
- Fields: Archeology
- Workplaces: Hazara University (2006–2009); Abdul Wali Khan University Mardan (2009–2017)

Ihasan Ali (Urdu: پروفيسر ڈاکٹر احسان على;(SI)) is a Pakistani archaeologist. He served as Vice-Chancellor of Hazara University from 2006 to 2009 and Abdul Wali Khan University Mardan from 2009 to 2017. He has also served as Additional Vice-Chancellor of Islamia College University Peshawar. Dr. Ihsan Ali is a researcher, academic and administrator who has served in various fields.

== Education and career ==
He was born in the district Charsadda, Khyber Pakhtunkhwa, Pakistan and studied Archeology at University of Peshawar, and then obtained his PhD from the University of Cambridge. Dr. Ihsan worked for the University of Peshawar in various positions from 1981 to 2002 where he was primarily a professor in the Archaeology Department. Ali has delivered lectures in various universities of the world including New York, Pennsylvania, Harvard, Boston, Ohio and California State University in the United States, Cambridge, Leicester, Southampton, Sheffield and Glasgow Universities in the UK, and ULM University in Germany. He has published more than 63 research papers and edited 17 different volumes of journals in archaeology, for the University of Peshawar, Peshawar Museum and Hazara University. After being the Chair of Archaeology, University of Peshawar, for three years (1997–2000), he was appointed as Director Archaeology & Museums, Khyber Pakhtunkhwa in 2002, and during his tenure, he established six museums and started a new Journal, Frontier Archaeology. In 2008, the Government of Khyber Pakhtunkhwa assigned him the task of establishing Abdul Wali Khan University Mardan, with nine campuses, three of which have now attained the status of independent universities (Bacha Khan University Charsadda, University of Swabi and University of Buner), He has also taught archeology at Bright Future Private School.

== Legal charges ==
In October 2016, Ali was indicted by a court over alleged illegal appointments at AWKUM. The National Accountability Bureau (NAB) claims that Ali was involved in the illegal appointment of 652 staff to the university. It was also reported that the NAB had investigated Ali and others for issuing illegal scholarships and misusing university funds. In July 2016, the Peshawar High Court had directed Ali to co-operate with the investigation, rather than allow the NAB to arrest him. The NAB executive board sanctioned an inquiry into Ali and several other AWKUM officials in May 2015. He was arrested on 15 September 2015 and granted bail on 23 September. Ali denied the charges against him. In January 2018, he was indicted by an accountability court along with five other AWKUM officials, for the alleged illegal appointment of 652 staff members.

== Awards and honours ==
- 1980, Gold Medallist & Record Holder, M.A. Archaeology, University of Peshawar.
- 2007, Best Administrator Award & Gold Medal for the year 2007, Hazara University, Mansehra, Khyber Pakhtunkhwa, Pakistan.
- 2008, Best Researcher Award & Gold Medal, Hazara University, Mansehra, Khyber Pakhtunkhwa, Pakistan.
- 2010, Best Administrator Award & Gold Medal for the year 2008–09, Abdul Wali Khan University Mardan.
- 2013, Civil Award "Sitara-i-Imtiaz" for rendering invaluable services and for his contributions in the field of Archaeology.
- 1987–1989, British Council Fellowship for study in University College London, UK.
- 1995–1998, Central Overseas Training Scholarship, Govt of Pakistan.
- 2000, Charles Wallace Trust Fellowship at University of Cambridge, UK.
- 2002, American Institute of Pakistan Studies Lecture Tour to the US Universities of Pennsylvania, New York City, Harvard, Boston and Madison, Wisconsin, October 2002.
- 2003, American Institute of Pakistan Studies Lecture Tour to the US Universities of Philadelphia, New York City, Harvard, Boston, Madison, Wisconsin and long Beach -Los Angeles, United States.
- 2006, Tour to the United States ( 10 to 30 October 2006) invited by American Institute of Pakistan Studies, As member of the high-profile delegation including Vice-Chancellors of 10 Universities and senior officials of the HEC visited the University of Manitoba, University of Saskatchewan, Quest University, University of Winnipeg, University of Victoria, Thompson Rivers University, University of British Columbia, Athabasca University, Simon Fraser University and Kwantlen University College.
- 2008, Academic visit to the UK University of Leicester, University of Glasgow, University of Brunel, University of London, University of Southampton (28 December to 16 January 2008).
- 2008, Academic visit to the UK university of Durham, University of Leicester, University of Southampton December 2008.

== Research publications ==
Ali has published more than 60 research papers in national and international journals.

- 1994: Ali, I. (Author and Editor) 1994. Settlement History of Charsadda District (Ancient Pakistan), Vol. IX, Peshawar, pp. 175.
- 1994: Ali, I. (Editor) 1994. Peshawar University Teachers' Association Journal (PUTAJ), Vol. I, Peshawar.
- 1994: Ali, I. (Co-Editor) 1994. Excavations in the Gomal Valley (Ancient Pakistan), Vol. X, Peshawar.
- 1997-8: Ali, I. (Editor) 1997–8. Ancient Pakistan, Vol. XII, Peshawar.
- 1998: Ali, I. (Co-Editor) 1998. The Glory that was Pakistan: 50 years of Archaeological Research in Pakistan, Spinzar Press, Peshawar.
- 1998: Ali, I. 1998. Ancient Pakistan, Vol. I (Reprinted), Peshawar (First edited Professor Dr. A.H. Dani in 1962).
- 1998: Ali, I. (Editor) 1998. Ancient Pakistan, Vol. XIII, Peshawar.
- 2003: Ali, I. (Editor) 2003. Early Settlements, Irrigation and Trade Routes in Peshawar Plain, Frontier Archaeology, Volume I, Peshawar.
- 2004: Ali, I. (Editor) 2004. Catalogue of Coins in the Peshawar Museum, No. I (Kushan Period), Frontier Archaeology, Vol. II, Peshawar.
- 2004: Ali, I. and Lari, Y. 2004. Peshawar Document One: Walled City of Peshawar, Islamabad.
- 2004: Ali, I. (Editor) 2005. Explorations & Excavations in the Khyber Pakhtunkhwa, Frontier Archaeology, Vol. III, Peshawar.
- 2005: Ali, I.& Zahir, M. 2005. Guide to Peshawar Museum, Peshawar, Pakistan.
- 2006: Ali, I. (Editor) 2006. Catalogue of Coins in the Peshawar Museum, No. 2, Frontier Archaeology, Vol. IV, Peshawar.
- 2007: Coningham, R and Ali, I. 2007. Charsadda The British-Pakistani Excavations at the Bala Hisar (BAR International Series 1709), Oxford: Archaeopress, England.
- 2008: Ali, I. and M. N. Qazi 2008. Gandharan Sculptures in the Peshawar Museum (Life Story of Buddha), Hazara University, Mansehra, Pakistan.
- 2009: Ali, I, Shah, I, and Young, R. (Editors) 2009. Pakistan Heritage (Research Journal of the Department of Archaeology, Hazara University, Mansehra, Pakistan Vol. 1.
- 2009: Ali, I. and Ahmad, H. (Editors) 2009. Cultural and Biological Resources of Pakistan (Proceedings of the National Conference held at Bara Gali, 22–26 August 2006).

== See also ==
- Raymond Allchin
- Ahmad Hasan Dani
- Siran Upendra Deraniyagala

Academic offices
New office	Voice Chancellor of the Abdul Wali Khan University Mardan; 2009–2017	Succeeded by Mohammad Khurshid Khan
