= Vladimir Pushkarev =

Soviet weightlifter (1921–1994)

Personal information
- Born: 1921
- Died: 1994 (aged 73)

Sport
- Sport: Weightlifting
- Club: Dynamo
Medal record
Representing Soviet Union
World Weightlifting Championships
Bronze medal – third place	1950 Paris	Middleweight
European Weightlifting Championships
Gold medal – first place	1950 Paris	Middleweight

Vladimir Vladimirovich Pushkarev (Russian: Владимир Владимирович Пушкарев; 1921–1994) was a Soviet weightlifter. In 1950 he won the European middleweight title and a bronze medal at the world championships. He was the Soviet champion in 1949, 1951, 1952 and 1954, finishing second in 1946, 1948 and 1950.
