= Pușcaș =

Puşcaş is a Romanian surname. Notable people with the surname include:

- George Pușcaș (born 1996), Romanian football player
- Ioan Puşcaş (1932–2015), Romanian physician
- Vasile Louis Puscas (1915–2009), American Roman Catholic bishop
- Vasile Pușcaș (born 1952), Romanian politician and diplomat
- Victor Puşcaş (1943–2023), Moldovan politician

== See also ==
- Puskás (disambiguation)
