= Pushka =

Pushka may refer to:

- (Пушка) a gun or cannon in the Russian language, and used to characterize the Russian Tsar Cannon
- A tehsil in the Barabanki district of Northern India, in the Awadh region of the State of Uttar Pradesh
- A tzedakah (charity) box in the home or the synagogue used to collect money for donation to the poor. (In Yiddish, from the Polish word puszka, which means tin can.)
