= Pushkarasari script =

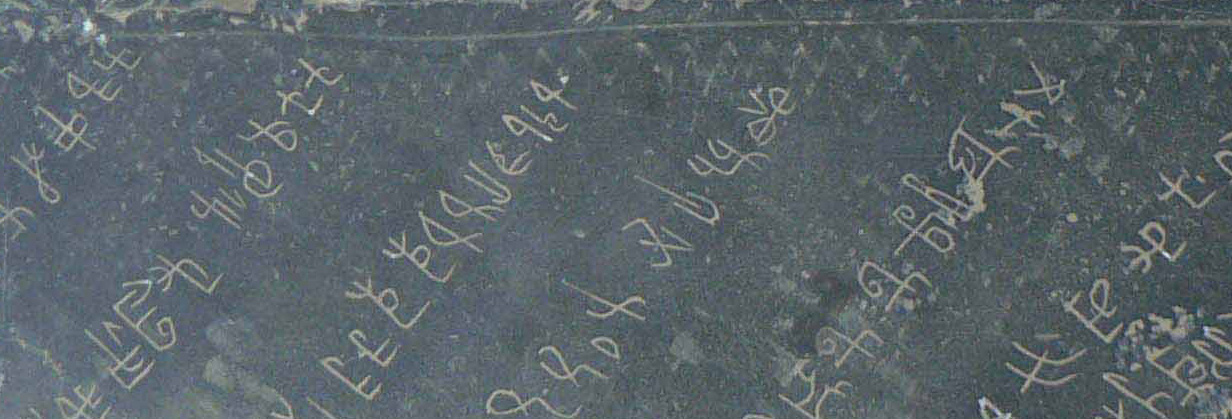
Kohi inscription from Gandhara

Pushkarasari is an undeciphered writing system used in Gandhara (in what is now Afghanistan and Pakistan) and Central Asia from the 3rd century BC to the eighth century AD. Earlier, the script was called "Kohi", but later study and deciphering of the script has identified the actual name of the script which is Puṣkarasāri, mentioned in different ancient literature.

This writing system bears some resemblance to both Brahmi script and Kharosthi script as well as a few Chinese characters.
