= Abdul Wali Khan University Mardan =

Public university in Mardan, Pakistan

Coordinates: 34.1509°N 72.0474°E

- Motto: پوهه رنړا ده
- Type: Public
- Established: April, 2009
- Chancellor: Chief Minister, Khyber Pakhtunkhwa
- Vice-Chancellor: Dr. Jamil Ahmad
- Provost: Abdul Samad Khan Marwat
- Pro Vice-Chancellor: Dr. Zahir Shah
- Academic staff: 501; 196 PhD's & 138 MPhil
- Students: ~15,345
- Location: Mardan, Khyber-Pakhtunkhwa, Pakistan
- Campus: Main Campus; Garden Campus; University College for Women; University College of Science Shankar; Riffat Mahal Campus; Rashid Hussain Shaheed Campus; Pabbi Campus
- Colours: Green, red, brown
- Affiliations: Higher Education Commission (Pakistan), Pakistan Veterinary Medical Council, Pharmacy Council of Pakistan, Pakistan Bar Council
- Website: awkum.edu.pk

The Abdul Wali Khan University, Mardan (AWKUM) (Urdu: جامعہ عبد الولی خان مردان) (Pashto: د عبدالولی خان پوھنتون مردان) is a public university located in the Mardan District of the Khyber-Pakhtunkhwa province of Pakistan. Named after Abdul Wali Khan, the university has forty nine institutions affiliated with it. The university started in the historical postgraduate college of Mardan. It has nine campuses and more than ten thousand students enrolled in thirty one disciplines as of 2015. The campus at Swabi, opened in October 2010 in the Anbar Elementary College building has since then become the University of Swabi. The Palosa campus is home to Bacha Khan University. Currently the university has three constituent colleges and six faculties. Those include the faculties of Arts & Humanities, Agriculture, Chemical and Life Sciences, Physical & Numerical Sciences, Economics & Business and Social Sciences. The Pashtunkhwa College of Art, Womans' College and the Animal Husbandry and Veterinary College are also constituent colleges of the university.

== Faculties and departments ==
Abdul Wali Khan University consists of six faculties, which have the following departments:

=== Faculty of Arts & Humanities ===
- English
- Pakhtunkhwa College of Arts
- Islamic Studies
- Pashto
- Museum

=== Faculty of Agriculture ===
- Agronomy
- Entomology
- Food Science and Technology
- Horticulture

=== Faculty of Business & Economics ===
- Economics
- Institute of Business Studies and Leadership
- Management Sciences
- Museum
- Tourism & Hospitality

=== Faculty of Chemical & Life Sciences ===
- Biochemistry
- Biotechnology
- Botany
- Chemistry
- College of Animal Husbandry & Veterinary Sciences
- Environmental Sciences
- Microbiology
- Pharmacy
- Zoology

=== Faculty of Technologies & Engineering Sciences ===
- Computer Science
- Mathematics

=== Faculty of Numerical and Physical Sciences ===
- Physics
- Statistics
- Geology

=== Faculty of Social Sciences ===
- Education
- International Relations (IR) - where a brilliant scholar Dr. Dalir Khan Khattak also teaches.
- Political Science
- Physical Education & Sports
- Journalism & Mass Communication
- Law
- Pakistan Studies
- Psychology
- Sociology

== University Institutes and Colleges ==
- Institute of Business Studies and Leadership
- University College for Women
- Pakhtunkhwa College of Arts
- College of Animal Husbandry & Veterinary Sciences

== Campuses and libraries ==
The university has several campuses, each with library facilities:

- Main Campus—Central Library
- Garden Campus
- Pabbi Campus
- Palosa Campus
- Riffat Mahal Campus
- Shankar Campus

There is also a digital library serving all campuses.

=== University College of Science, Shankar ===
The University College of Science in Shankar has departments of Chemistry and Computer Science. It is housed in a 12.5-acre complex with state-of-the-art research laboratories. It has full-fledged working laboratories in physical chemistry, organic chemistry, inorganic chemistry, analytical chemistry and computer science. A video lecture facility is also available.

=== Garden Campus ===
The newly constructed Garden Campus of the university is spread over on more than 2000 Kanals of land having state of the art infrastructure, well equipped laboratories, one of the biggest libraries of the region, computer labs, three hostels with a capacity of 1500 students, two on campus colleges, sports complex and many other facilities. Classes in the campus have been started.

== Journals ==
- Tahdhīb al Afkār

Tahdhīb al Afkārbiannual is the biannual Islamic studies research journal of Abdul Wali Khan University Mardan published in three different languages English, Urdu and Arabic.

- Journal of Business and Tourism
- Pakhtunkhwa Journal of Life Science (PJLS)

== Extra-curricular activities ==
The university provides extra-curricular activities such as painting, articles, photography and sport. The students can participate through proper channels. The university provides facilities for many sports; they have been merged into the Department of Physical Education and Health and named as Department of Physical Education and Sports.

== Academic collaborations ==
Abdul Wali Khan University, Mardan establish partnerships with national as well as international universities, associations, institutes and academies and have signed a memorandum of understanding (MOUs or MoUs) with each. The following is the list of international collaborations.

S/N	University / association	Country
1	Birmingham City University	United Kingdom
2	Brunel University London	United Kingdom
3	Durham University	United Kingdom
4	School of Oriental and African Studies (SOAS, University of London)	United Kingdom
5	University of Leicester	United Kingdom
6	University of Sheffield	United Kingdom
7	University of Southampton	United Kingdom
8	University of Rostock	Germany
9	University of Ulm	Germany
10	University of Malaya	Malaysia
11	University of Technology, Malaysia (UTM)	Malaysia
12	Sejong University	South Korea
13	Kyungpook National University	South Korea
14	Seoul National University	South Korea
15	University of Barcelona	Spain
16	University of Camerino	Italy
17	Eastern Mediterranean University, North Cyprus	Turkey
18	Pamukkale University	Turkey
19	Recep Tayyip Erdoğan University	Turkey
20	Eskişehir Osmangazi University	Turkey
21	Şırnak University	Turkey
22	University of Kentucky	United States
23	North Dakota State University	United States
24	University of Missouri-Kansas City	United States
25	Nakhon Pathom Rajabhat University	Thailand
26	Victoria University of Wellington	New Zealand
27	Massey University	New Zealand
28	Eastern European University Association	Russia
29	Hanns Seidel Foundation	Germany
30	Relief International UK	United States
31	Promotion of Education in Pakistan (PEP) Foundation, Inc.	United States

== Mashal Khan incident ==
On 13 April 2017, Mashal Khan, a journalism student at the university, was murdered by a mob apparently including university employees and some of his classmates on the false suspicion of uploading blasphemous content on the social networking site Facebook.

== Vice Chancellors ==
- Dr. Ihsan Ali (SI) (2009 – March 20, 2017)
- Dr. Mohammad Khurshid Khan (September 18, 2017 – March 20, 2020)
- Dr. Zahoor-ul-Haq (1 May 2020– 8 May 2025)
- Dr. Jamil Ahmad (May 9, 2025 – Present)
