= List of populated places in Mardan District =

Landi List of populated places in Mardan District.

== A ==
- Alo

== B ==
- Babini
- Babozai, Mardan
- Baghdada
- Bakhshali
- Bala Garhi
- Bijli Ghar

Baja kely

== C ==
- Chamtar
- Charguli

== D ==
- Dagai
- Dheri
- Deputy Kalli

== G ==
- Garhi Daulatzai
- Garhi Ismail Zai
- Garyala
- Ghafe
- Gujar Garhi

== G ==
- Imadkhan homes

== H ==
- Hathian

== J ==
- Jalala
- Jamal Garhi
- Jhungara

== L ==
- Landi
- kuz cham Shahbaz Khan hujra

== M ==
- Muslimabad (Mardan)

== P ==
- Pirsai

== R ==
- Rustam, Mardan

== S ==
- Sadaat Baba
- Sangao (Mardan District)
- Saro Shah
- Sawal Dher
- Shergarh, Mardan
- Lundkhwar

== T ==
- Takkar
- Tazagram
- Toru, Mardan
