= Garhi =

Garhi (lit. 'fort') may refer to several places:

India

- Garhi Abdullakhan, a village in Shamli district, Uttar Pradesh, India
- Garhi, Banswara, a village and tehsil in Banswara, Rajasthan, India
- Garhi Harsaru, a town in Gurugram, Haryana, India
- Garhi, Kaurali, a village in Karauli, Rajasthan, India
- Garhi Mahan Singh, a village in Jalandhar, Punjab, India
- Garhi Pukhta, a city in Uttar Pradesh, India
- Hanuman Garhi Temple, Uttar Pradesh, India

Pakistan

- Garhi Daulatzai
- Garhi Dupatta
- Garhi Habibullah
- Garhi Ismail Zai
- Garhi Khuda Bakhsh
- Garhi Matani
- Garhi Shahu
- Garhi Sher Ahmed
- Garhi Yasin
- Garhi Phulgran, misspelling of Ghari Phulgran

Garhi may also refer to:

- Australopithecus garhi, a gracile australopithecine species whose fossils were discovered in 1996 by a research team led by Ethiopian paleontologist Berhane Asfaw and Tim White, an American paleontologist

== See also ==
- Garh, a village in Uttar Pradesh, India
- Garha, an Indian Muslim caste
- Garha Kingdom, in medieval India
