= Matani =

Matani may refer to:

- Matani, Georgia, a village in Georgia
  - Matani monastery
- Matani, Pakistan, a village in Khyber Pakhtunkhwa, Pakistan
- Asadullah Matani, Afghan cricketer

== See also ==
- Garhi Matani, a village in Punjab, Pakistan
