= Sadaat Baba =

Pakistani village

Sadaat Baba is one of the villages of Lund Khwar, in Mardan District of Khyber Pakhtunkhwa in Pakistan. The village is located to the east of Lund Khwar. The original name of Sadat Baba is Syed Kaloshah, derived from malakand dialect around 1700.

== Tribes ==
Besides the Syedan and the Badrashi, people from tribes such as the Baghwanan and the Kulalan also live in Sadaat Baba.

== Shrine ==
The shrine of the Saint Sadaat Baba is a prominent feature, and is located centrally in the village. Local lore attribute the peace of the village is derived from thieves being unable to enter the village due to the existence of the shrine.

== Localities ==
The main village is divided into two districts: Syedan cham and Badraho Cham. They are separated by the road that runs through Sadat Baba and connects Lund Khawar and Katlang.

The population of the village is growing, as outsiders are moving into an eastern extension of the village referred to as Derai.

== Schools ==
The state funded educational system is provided under a school for each gender. There is a private school. Educational pursuit following primary school requires studying in the nearby village of Kotki or Lund Khawar.

== Geography ==
Sadaat Baba is bordered by a canal to the west, and Laiq Ustad House, and the villages of Shamshi and Koktki to the east. The village of Shahi Abad is located to the north, the villages of Salak and Ghondai are located to the south. The village of Dara is to the north west.
