= Kotki (disambiguation) =

Kotki is a town in Khyber-Pakhtunkhwa, Pakistan.

Kotki may also refer to the following villages in Poland:

- Kotki, Świętokrzyskie Voivodeship (south-central Poland)
- Kotki, Warmian-Masurian Voivodeship (north Poland)
