= Utmankhel =

Pashtun Tribe

اتمان خیل

Languages
- Pashto

Religion
- Islam

Related ethnic groups
- Karlani Pashtun and other tribes.

The Utmankhel (Pashto: اتمان‌خېل) is a Pashtun tribe present in Pakistan, with substantial numbers in Afghanistan. They lie between the Mohmands and the Ranizais of Swat, to the west and south-west of the junction of the Swat and Panjkora rivers. The Utmankhel mostly living in Malakand, Bajaur, Mohmand, Lower Dir, Mardan and Orakzai. The Utmankhel are Pashtuns, part of the Karlani tribal confederacy, who fought against British and Mughals emperors in Pakhtunkhwa. The British regarded the Utmankhel tribesmen as “warlike” peoples and one of the Martial Race. The Utmankhel are a tall, stout and fair race, but their dress and general customs have been assimilated by the neighboring peoples of Bajaur. Utmankhel speak the same dialect of Pashtu called Peshawari Pashto.

== Notable people ==
- Saeed Gul—(Lower Dir)
- Bahadar Khan—(Lower Dir)
- Fida Mohammad Khan—(Malakand)
- Gul Dad Khan—(Bajaur)
- Inayatullah Khan
- Muhammad Umar Khan "Swal Qilla Malak"—(Bajaur)
- Nisar Muhammad—(Malakand)
- Muzafar Said—(Lower Dir)
- Rahmat Shah Sail
- Muhammad Khan Toor Utmankhel
- Ajmal Khan Wazir—(Bajaur)

== See also ==
- Utmankhel Subdivision
- Barang Subdivision
- Ambar Utmankhel
- Pran Ghar Tehsil
- Dara Utmankhel
- Gosam
- Agra (union council)
- Kharkai
- Kohi Barmol
- Mian Khan
- Sangao (Mardan District)

== Sources ==
- A-H. McMahon and A.D.G. Ramsay Report on the Tribes of Dir, Swat and Bajour together with the Utmankhel and Sam Ranizai, reprint 1981, p. 27. Henceforth McMahon and Ramsay
