= Babuzai (disambiguation) =

Babuzai may refer to:

- Babuzai (Pashtun tribe)
- Union Council Babozai in Mardan
- Tehsil Babuzai in Swat
