= Phagwara =

- City
- Location in Punjab, India Phagwara (India)
- Coordinates: 31.22°N 75.77°E
- Country: India
- State: Punjab
- District: Kapurthala
- Founder: Chaudhary Phaggu Mal Basra
- Named for: Phagu Da Wara

Government
  - Type: Democracy
  - Body: Government of Punjab, India

Area
  - Total: 20 km^{2} (7.7 sq mi)
- Elevation: 234 m (768 ft)

Population (2011)
  - Total: 117,954
  - Rank: 288
  - Density: 6,117/km^{2} (15,840/sq mi)
- Time zone: UTC+5:30 (IST)
- PIN: 144401; 144402
- Telephone code: 01824
- Vehicle registration: PB-36
- Post office: Phagwara H.O; Satnampura S.O

Phagwara (Punjabi: [pʰɐgɐʋaːɽaː]; ISO: Phagawāṛā) is a city and a municipal corporation in the Kapurthala district of Punjab, India. It is located 40 kilometres (25 mi) from the district headquarters of Kapurthala, and 124 kilometres (77 mi) from the state capital, Chandigarh. Phagwara is known for its production of sugar, glucose, starch, fine fabric and auto parts. It is locally known for the Shri Hanuman Garhi Temple.

== History ==
Phagwara was initially a market town in the region of Punjab. In 1635, the Sikh Guru, Guru Hargobind Sahib, visited the city.

Bhai Phaggu, a Gurmukh, Masand, and Sri Guru Amardas Ji devotee, played a pivotal role in the development of Phagwara. Guru Amardas sent Bhai Phaggu to preach Sikhism to the city of Sasaram in Bihar, where Phaggu spent the rest of his life. Guru Teg Bahadur once visited Bhai Phaggu in Bihar and called him Chacha ji, leading to Bhai Phaggu Ji, also known as Chacha Phaggu.

When Guru Hargobind Sahib (the sixth Sikh Guru) visited Phagwara in 1635 to see Bhai Phaggu's home, he was not respected by the townspeople, who opposed Bhai Phaggu. According to local legend, Guru Hargobind Ji exclaimed, “Phagu Da Warra, Bahron Mitha Andra Khara!” Over time, the term “Phagu Da Warra” evolved into “Phagwara,” becoming an enduring part of the region’s identity.

From Akbar's time to till 1803 Basra Jats remained Jagirdars of the Phagwara area, Bhai Phaggus family was the most powerful family of the Punjabi region of Doaba, controlling approximately 240 villages in Phagwara and Banga Tehsils. His descendant, Chaudhary Trilok Chand Basra, was married to Princess Rajinder Kanwar, daughter of Maharaja Ala Singh of Patiala. He was later succeeded by Chaudhary Chuhar Mal Basra, the last chief of the family. Chuhar Mal Basra was defeated by Maharaja Ranjit Singh in 1803.

== Geography ==
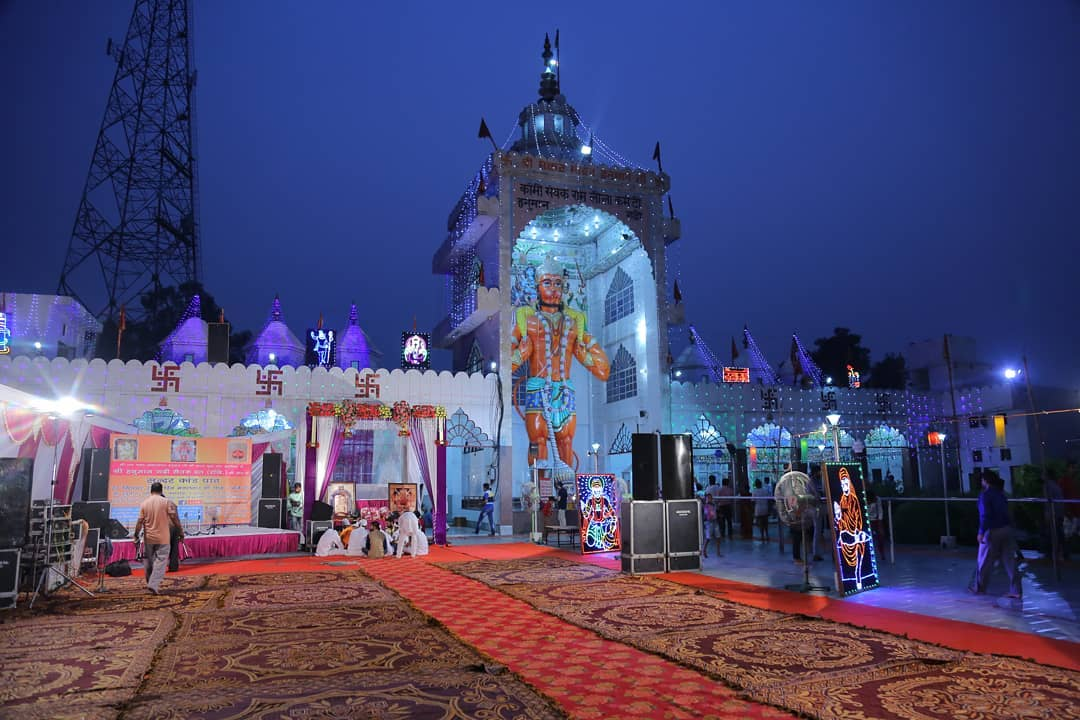
Shri Hanuman Garhi Temple

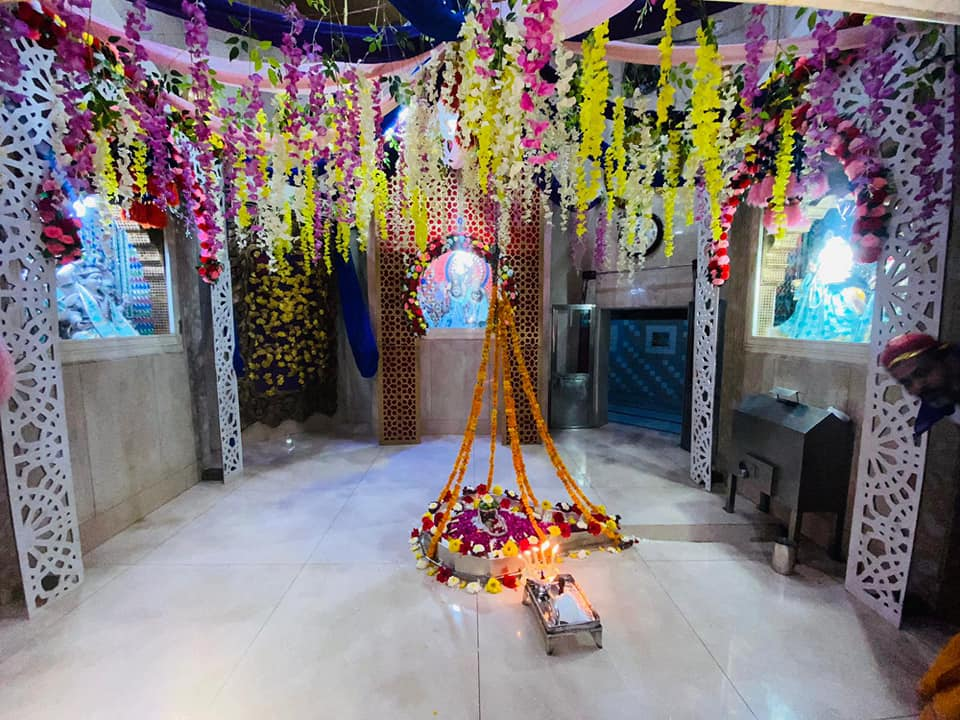
Shiv Mandir Pakka Bagh

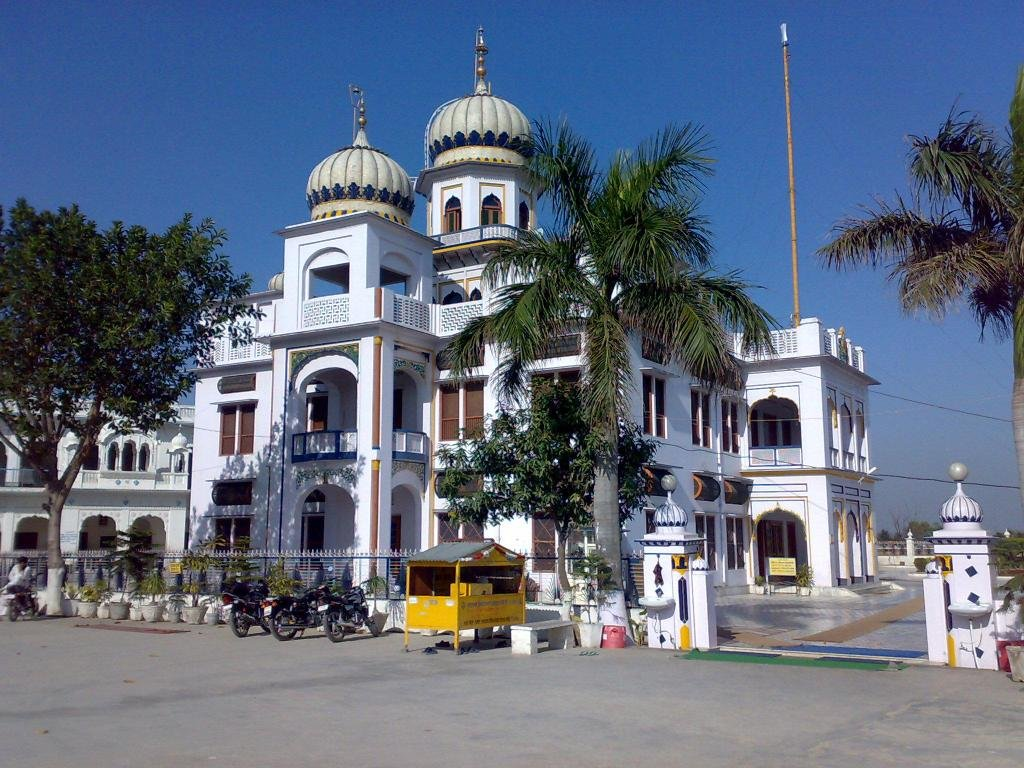
Gurudwara Sukhchain Sahib

Phagwara is located in Kapurthala district, in the state of Punjab. The city lies in the Doaba region, situated between the Beas and Sutlej rivers. It has an average elevation of 767 feet (234 m).

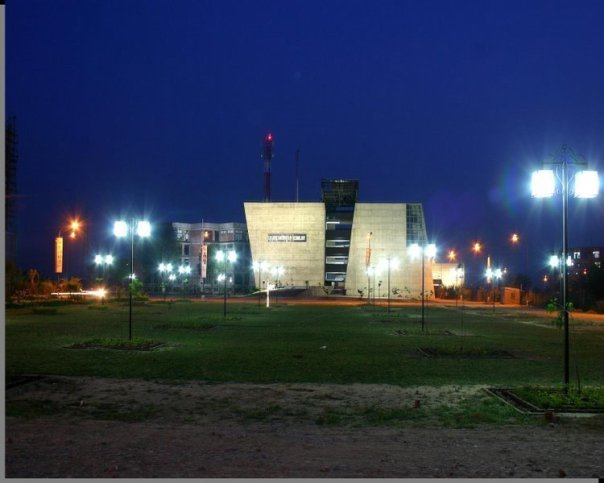
View of Lovely Professional University at night

== Demographics ==
According to provisional data from the 2011 Indian census, the Phagwara urban agglomeration had a population of 117,954 (62,171 males and 55,783 females) with a literacy rate of 87.43%.

In the 2011 census, the city of Phagwara had a population of 97,864 (51,386 males and 46,478 females). Phagwara had an average literacy rate of 86%, higher than the regional average of 75%. Male literacy was at 89%, while female literacy was at 83%. Up to 10% of Phagwaras population was under 6 years of age.

The table below shows the population of different religious groups in Phagwara, as of the 2011 Indian census.

Population by religious groups in Phagwara city, 2011 Indian census
Religion	Total	Female	Male
Hindu	73,845	34,877	38,968
Sikh	20,635	9,988	10,647
Muslim	1,434	663	771
Buddhist	730	347	383
Christian	280	134	146
Jain	233	123	110
Other religions	64	27	37
Not stated	643	319	324
Total	97,864	46,478	51,386

== Politics ==
The city is part of the Hoshiarpur constituency.
