= Hissar Baba =

Village in Pakistan

Hissar Baba is a small village located in the north of Khyber Pakhtunkhwa province, Pakistan, in the Malakand District. The population of this village per 2017 Census of Pakistan was 3,700 and the number of households was 408.

The people of the village mostly belong to the Utmankhel tribe who are prevalent in the Malakand District.
