= Qasami =

Qasmi: قاسمی; قاسمی
- Village and union council
- Country: Pakistan
- Region: Khyber Pakhtunkhwa
- District: Mardan
- Tehsil: Katlang
- Time zone: UTC+5 (PST)

Qasmi is a village and union council in Mardan District of Khyber Pakhtunkhwa. It has a population of approximately 5,000 people.

Qasmi is located about 35 km to the northeast of Mardan City. Other nearby towns are Katlang and Khwar. The village is surrounded by a river on three directions. Crops including wheat, maiz, sugarcane, tobacco are produced as well as many vegetables and fruits. The main source of the irrigation is the canal system, which was developed during the British era.

There is a government higher secondary school for boys, a primary school for boys, a primary school for girls (Mianjee Abad), a higher secondary school for girls, two private schools for boys (Qasmi Model School, Islamia Public School Qasmi and Spring Public School Qasmi).
