= Takht-i-Bahi =

Archaeological site of an ancient Buddhist monastery in Pakistan

Takht-i-Bahi تختِ باہی
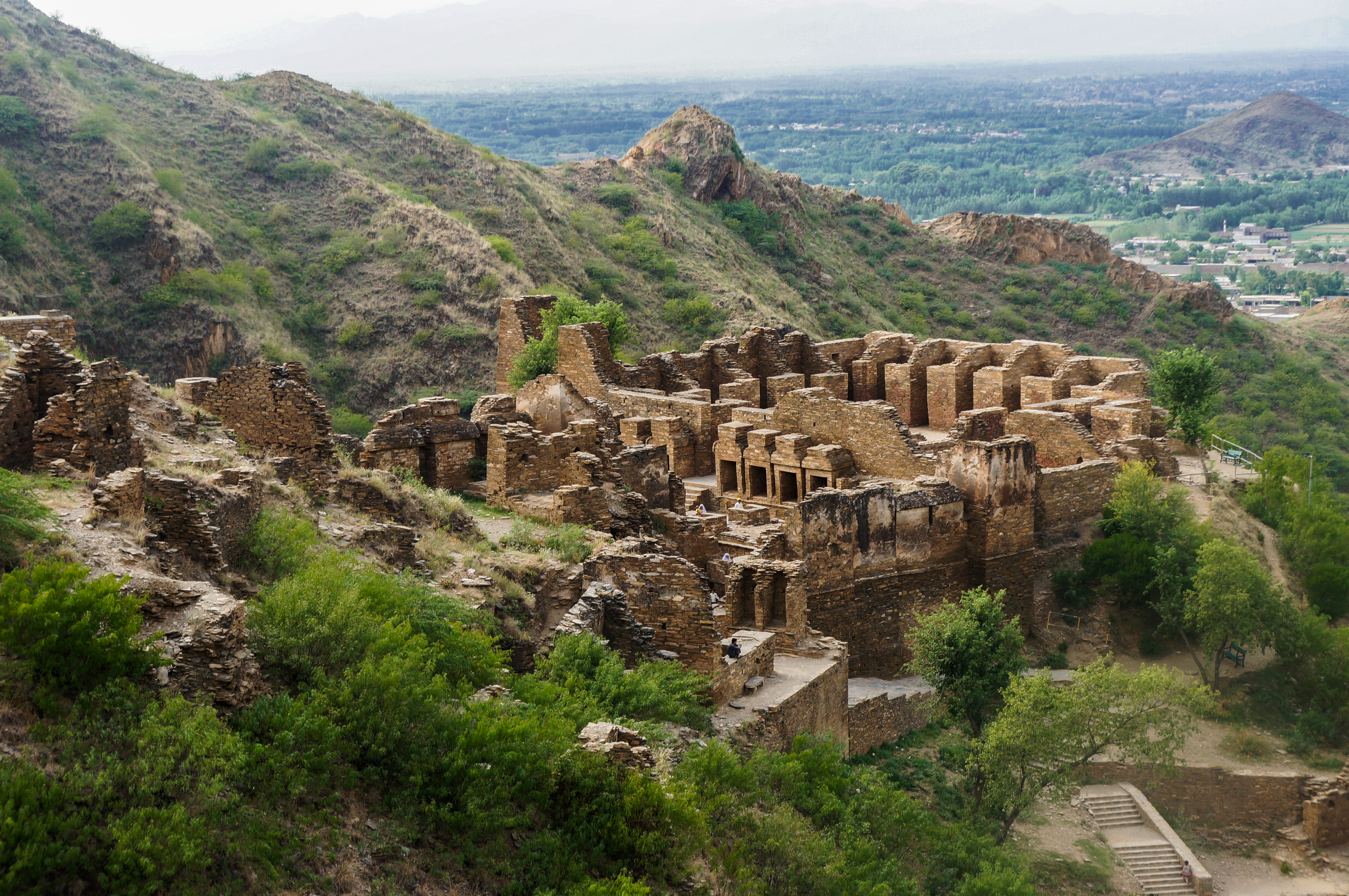
- A view of the site's main cluster of ruins

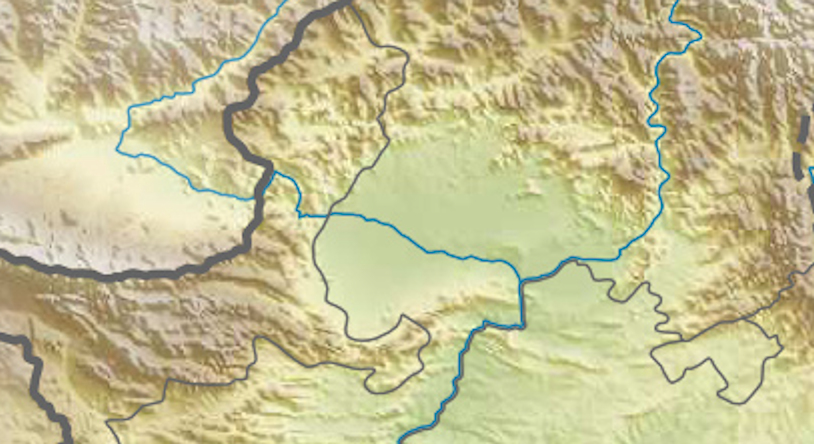
- Location within Gandhara Location within Khyber Pakhtunkhwa Location within Pakistan
- 34°17′10″N 71°56′48″E
- Type: Settlement
- Location: Mardan, Khyber Pakhtunkhwa, Pakistan

History
- Built: 1st century CE
- Abandoned: 7th century CE

Site notes
- Area: ...

UNESCO World Heritage Site
- Official name: Buddhist Ruins of Takht-i-Bahi and Neighbouring City Remains at Sahr-i-Bahlol
- Type: Cultural
- Criteria: iv
- Designated: 1980 (4th session)
- Reference no.: 140
- Region: Asia-Pacific

Takht-i-Bahi (Pashto/Urdu: تختِ باهی, lit. 'throne of the water spring'), is an Indo-Parthian archaeological site of an ancient Buddhist monastery in Mardan, Khyber-Pakhtunkhwa, Pakistan. The site is considered among the most important relics of Buddhism in all of what was once Gandhara.

The monastery was founded in the 1st century CE, and was in use until the 7th century. The complex is regarded by archaeologists as being particularly representative of the architecture of Buddhist monastic centers from its era. Takht-i-Bahi was listed as a World Heritage Site in 1980, with UNESCO describing it as "exceptionally well-preserved".

== Etymology ==
The origin of the name Takht-i-Bahi is uncertain. According to a local belief, the site got its name from two wells on the hill or the springs nearby. In Persian, Takht means 'top' or 'throne' while bahi means 'spring' or 'water'. When put together, their meaning is 'spring from the top' or 'high spring', referencing two springs on the top of mountains. Another suggested meaning is 'throne of origin'.

Another etymology suggests that the name Takht-i-Bahi was possibly given to this monastery complex after the Muslims settled in the region. The word "Bahi" (بهی) or "Behhi" is neither Pashto nor Persian, and in one sense in Arabic, "Bahi" means beautiful and bright. In another sense, "Bahi" (بهی) means "بهی البیت بهیاً: the house which is empty and abandoned"; therefore, the "Takht-i-Bahi" (Takht = castle, palace) means a castle where in there no longer is settled a king and has remained abandoned.

== Demographics ==
=== Population ===
Historical population

Year	Pop.	±%
1961	3,181	—
1972	12,069	+279.4%
1981	18,325	+51.8%

Year	Pop.	±%
1998	49,202	+168.5%
2017	80,721	+64.1%
2023	85,040	+5.4%

As of the 2023 census, Takht-i-Bahi ranked 150th among cities in Pakistan by population, with a population of 85,040.

== Location ==
The ruins are located about 15 kilometres (9.3 mi) from Mardan in Pakistan's Khyber-Pakhtunkhwa Province. A small fortified city, dating from the same era, sits nearby. The ruins also sit near a modern village known by the same name. It is located around 150 metres (500 ft) atop the small hill and around 2 km (1.2 mi) from the village bazar. The surrounding area is known for cultivating sugar cane, wheat, maize, and vegetables. Once remote and little visited, the site now has a road and car park below the ruins and has become popular with visitors.

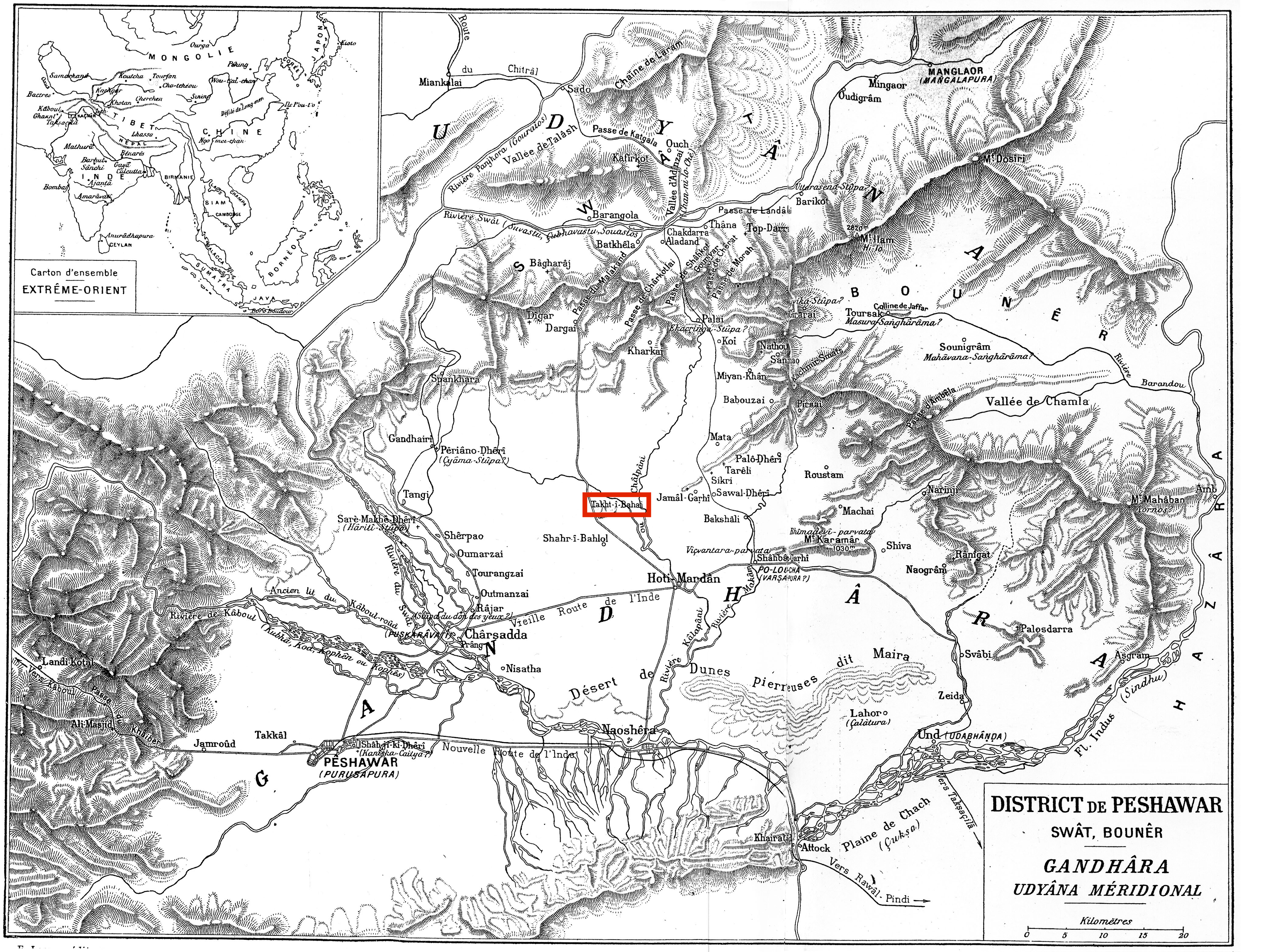
Location of Takht-i-Bahi, at the center of the Gandhara area

== Structure ==
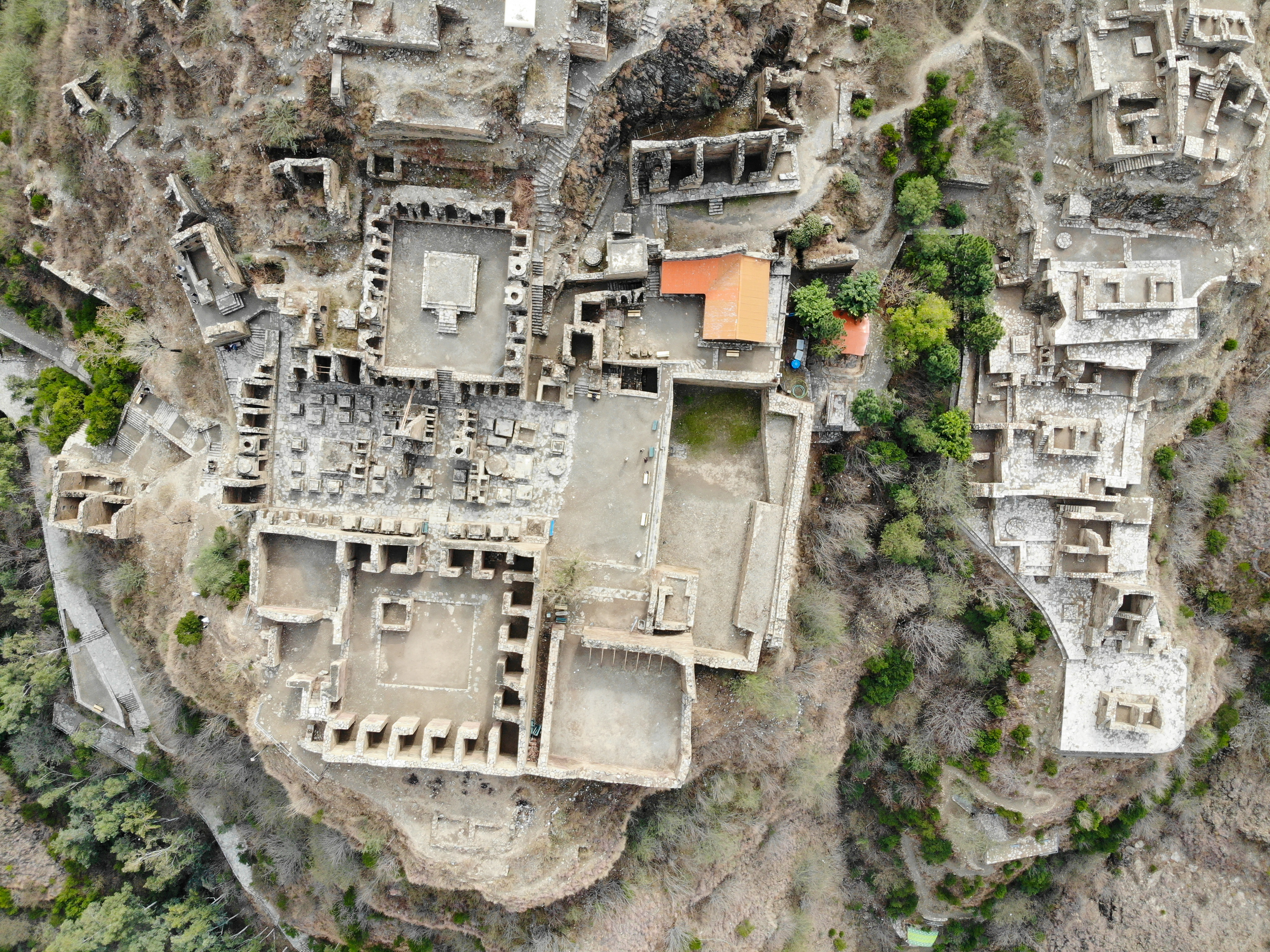
Aerial view of the ruins of the monastery

There are four main areas of the Takht Bahi complex:

- The Stupa Court, a cluster of stupas located in a central courtyard.
- The monastic chambers consist of individual cells arranged around a courtyard, assembly halls, and a dining area.
- A temple complex consisting of stupas similar to the Stupa Court but of later construction.
- The Tantric monastic complex, which consists of small, dark cells with low openings, which may have been used for certain forms of Tantric meditation.

Additional structures on the site may have served as residences or meeting halls or for secular purposes. All of the buildings on the site are constructed from local stone and are mortared with lime and mud.

== History ==
Archaeologists divided the history of the complex into four periods, beginning in the 1st century BCE.

The monastic complex was likely founded in the early 1st century CE. An inscription bearing the name of Gondophares (20–46 CE) has been found at the site. After Gondophares, the area came under the control of Kujula Kadphises, the first Kushan king. This first era continued until the 2nd century CE and is associated with another Kushan king Kanishka, as well as early Parthian and subsequent Kushan kings. The second construction period, which included the creation of the Stupa Court and assembly hall, occurred during the 3rd and 4th centuries CE. A third construction period, associated with the later Kushan dynasty and the Kidara Kushana rulers, occurred during the 4th and 5th centuries.

The region was subjugated by Huns in the middle of the fifth century CE, which ended the Kushan rule. The Hun ruler Toramana and his son Mihirakula killed many inhabitants of the Gandhara region and destroyed most Buddhist monasteries. Evidence suggests that Takht-i-Bahi was damaged in the same period of destruction by the Huns. However, the complex appears to have been in use until the 7th century CE.

The first modern historical reference to these ruins was made in 1836 by a French officer who referred to the Buddhist remains in a village named Mazdoorabad. Explorations and excavations on the site began in 1864. A significant number of objects can be found in the British Museum. The site underwent a major restoration in the 1920s.

== Works of art ==
A famous stair-riser from Takht-i-Bahi, now in the British Museum, shows devotees in Hellenistic costume.

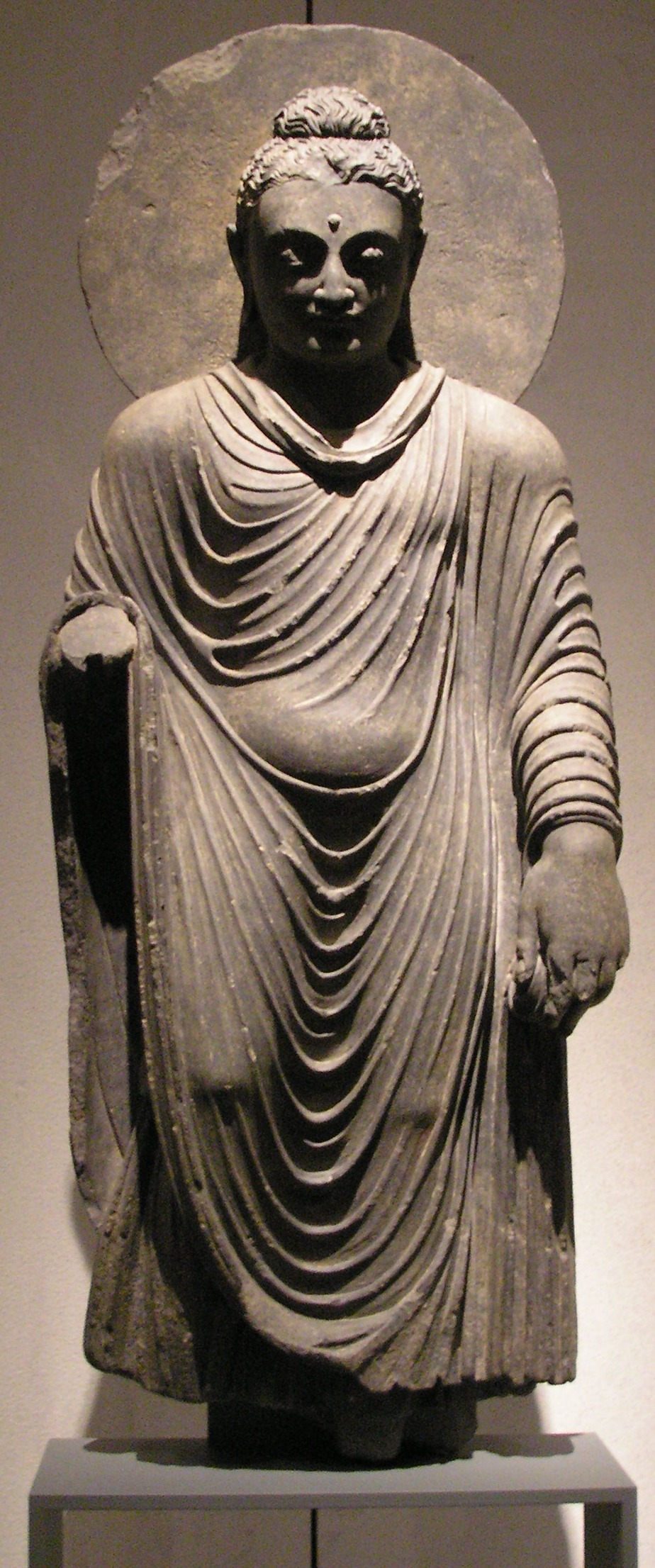
Statue of the Buddha, Takht-i-Bahi, 2nd–3rd century CE. Schist, H. 980 mm (39 in). Museum für Indische Kunst.

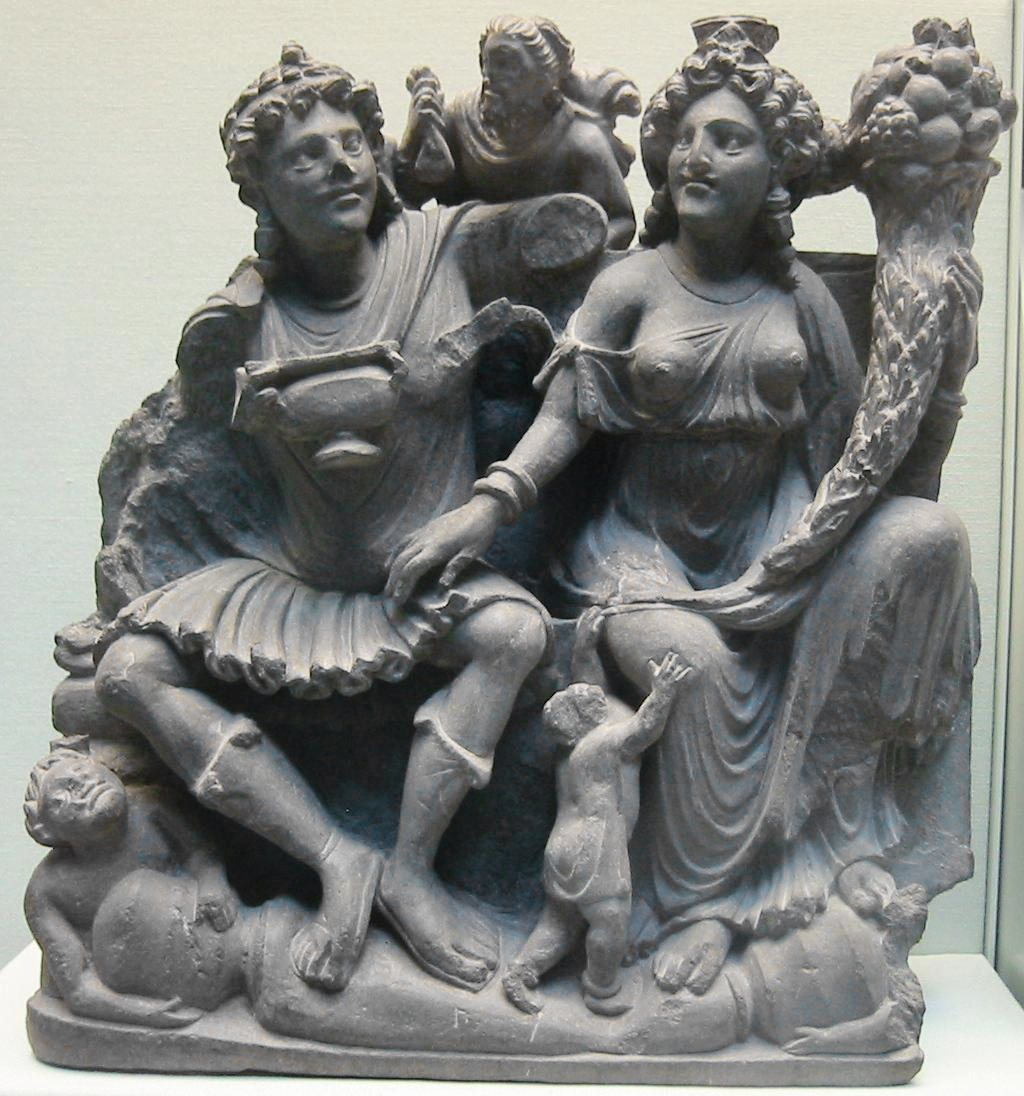
Couple protectors Pañcika and Hariti, Takht-i-Bahi. British Museum.

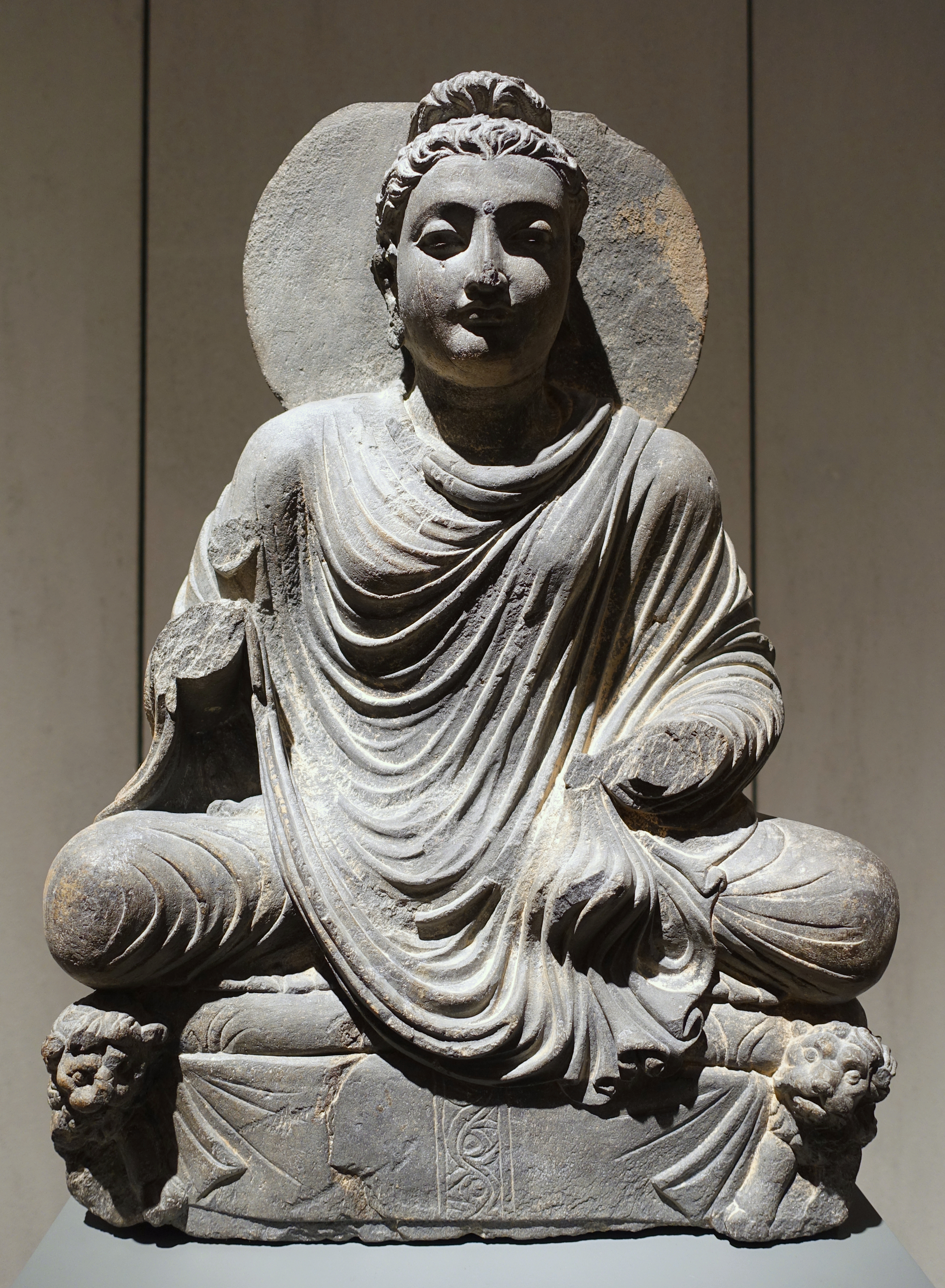
The Buddha on lion throne. Takht-i-Bahi. Schist, H. 525 mm (20.7 in). Museum für Indische Kunst.

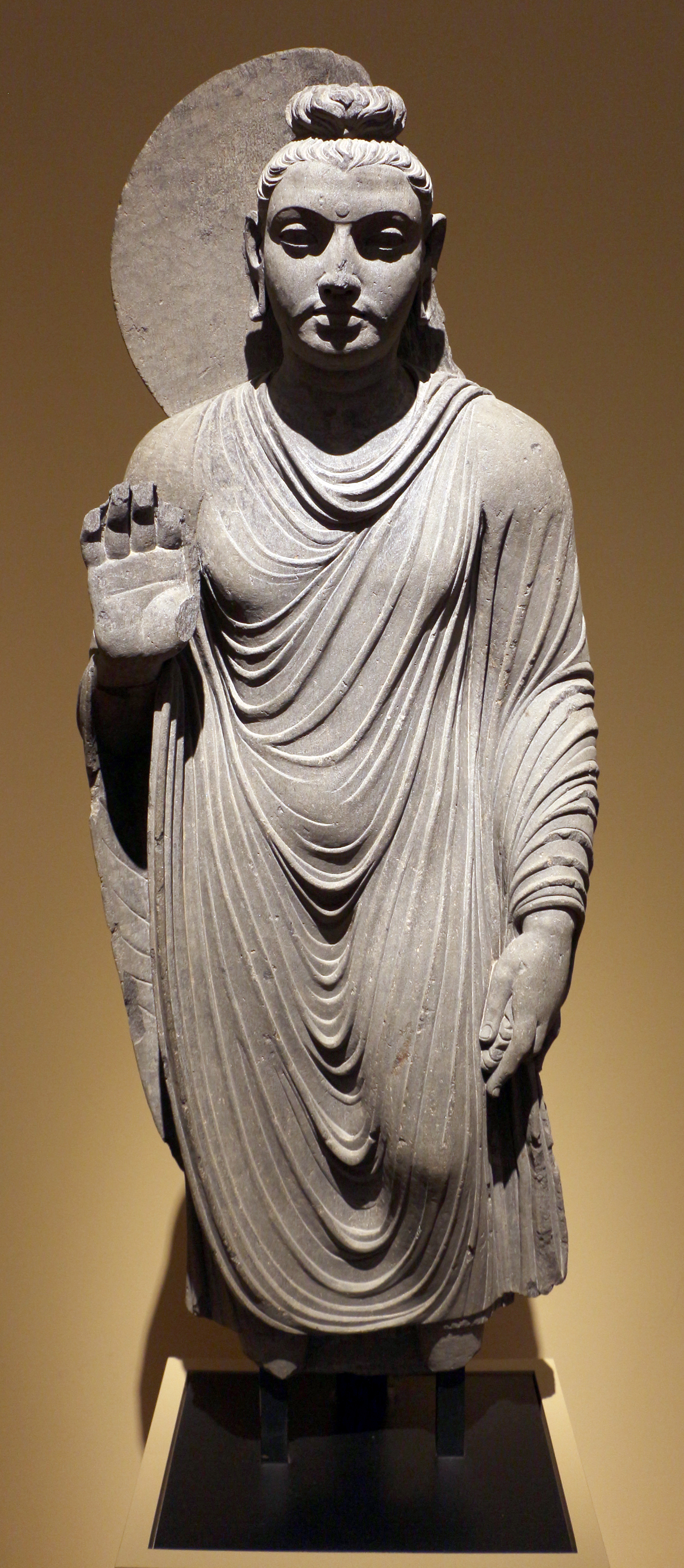
Shakyamuni, 150–200 CE, Cleveland Museum of Art, perhaps from Takht-i-Bahi

== Nearby localities ==
The villages of Thordher (Old name Said Ghani Kalae), Ghafe, Lund Khwar, Sher Garh, Saroo Shah, Sehri-Bahlol, Pathai, Mazdoorabad, Fazl-e-abad, Gangai, Hathian, Jalala, Pirsaddi, Takkar and Mashal Khan Kalai are other historical places in the vicinity of Takht-i-Bahi. The most historical location in the era is Sehri Bahlol. The monastery is situated on Malakand Road.

Various people have explained the word "Sehri-Bahlol" in different ways. Local people claim that it is a Hindko word meaning "Sir Bahlol", a prominent political and religious leader of the area. However, the village of Sehri-Bahlol is older than the name is.

== See also ==
- Buddhism in Pakistan
- List of museums in Pakistan
- List of UNESCO World Heritage Sites in Pakistan
- Ranigat – Another historic site in Buner
