= Danish Abad =

Suburb of Peshawar in Pakistan

Danish Abad (Urdu, Persian: دانش آباد ), literally "town of intellect", is a suburb town of Peshawar, the capital city of the Khyber Pakhtunkhwa Province of Pakistan. It was named after the first settlers in the locality.

== History ==
Previously, the area consisted of cultivated fields. Before the 1930s the locality had been called "Khru Sku" which translates to "eat and drink" in Pashto, an indication to the fact that the residents were poor farmers who only had farming as a means of self-sustenance. However, the suburb grew in importance with the building of the nearby University of Peshawar, Islamia College, The University Public School, The University Model School, Islamia College University of peshawar (ICP), Khyber Medical College, Khyber Teaching Hospital, University of Agriculture (Peshawar), Academy for Rural Development (PARD) and many other important academic, social, economic and commercial venues. It is because of these that Danish Abad today is famously called the Junction Town. Today it is a modern suburban town with well-lit roads and paved streets.

== Streets ==
The town is mapped out in streets starting from street "A" to street "M". On a north–south direction, street R is northernmost representing the front of Danish Abad; "R" here indicates the Railway Line which it borders. This is the famous Peshawar Landi Kotal Line that passes through the world-famous Khyber Pass. The southernmost part of the town is separated from the rest by the River Kabul Canal and its Canal Road. The easternmost part neighbors with the Pakistan Academy for Rural and Urban Development. The westernmost part borders with Akbar Town, which was previously part of Danish Abad but has now been separated.

== Demography ==
According to a recent survey the town consists of about 28,000 people. The town has its own Nazim and Naib Nazims. Many residents belong to famous parts of Khyber Pakhtunkhwa; a large number reside in Lund Khwar, Mardan, Charsadda, Swabi, Parachinar, Hangu, Kohat, Karak, Bannu and Regi Model Town.
