= Mian Khan =

Village in Khyber Pakhtunkhwa, Pakistan

Mian Khan is a village in Katlang Tehsil, Mardan District of Khyber Pakhtunkhwa Pakistan. This village has historical significance and is considered the oldest village in the province of Khyber Pakhtunkhwa dating back to 190 BC, after the archaeological dig of 2014.

== Location ==
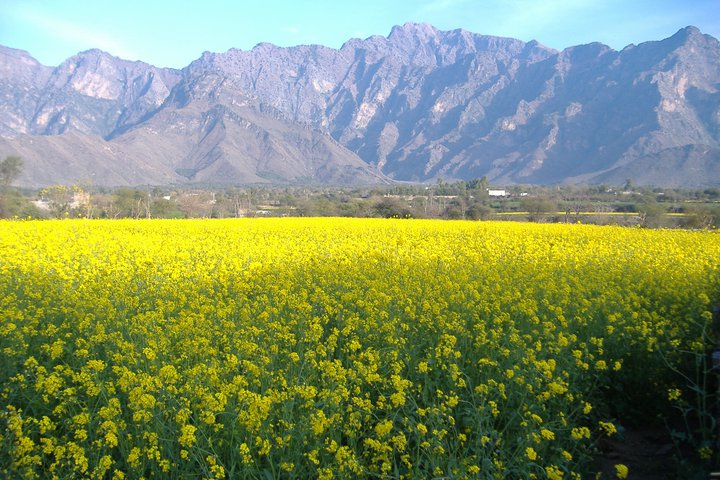
Mian Khan village

It is part of Kohi Barmol union council of Katlang Tehsil along with Sangao village. This village lies 19 miles northeast of Mardan city at the foot of the Mountain Range. This mountain range contains the highest peak of Mardan district locally known as Pajja or Sakra. Another small mountain named 'Sheikh Kara Baba' is also well-known place there, local people and guests visit there to enjoy the beauty and view of Mian Khan village. In the recent years, access to Peer Baba and Kingergali was completed through these mountains called TANGA .. Large number of visitors from local area visit Tanga mostly on Friday and on Eid days to enjoy the beauty, view of this place . A grave has been constructed called " Shaheeda abay" whose body was found during the construction of the Buner road and people of the area decided to place the grave on the same road side. And now they constructed a mosque and named it as Shaheeda Jumaat. This long mountain area is very famous for wild goat hunting.

== People ==
The inhabitants of the village belong to Utmankhel tribe of Pakhtuns, the descendants of Utman bin Karlanr (the famous Karlanri Qabayal). There are three main clans of Utmankhel tribe i.e. Miskeen khel, Mirhawas khel and Achoo khel living in the village which are subdivided further into smaller groups or khels. The traditional hujra system of Pashtun culture is still alive here. We can divide the inhabitants of Mian Khan village in four castes - Mirwaskhel, Aloo Khel, Moosa Khel, Zain Khan Khel and Maskeen Khel & Darab Khel.

In Mian Khan village, there are three primary schools and two high schools. Four private schools - Islamia Public, Muhammad bin Qasim, Utmankhel Public School and East Hills Public School. One of them has the mosque named Masjid-e- Qubba

The village had produced prominent figures in local and provincial politics.

- Tajbar Khan, MPA from PK 21 during 1985-1988.
- Hafiz Akhtar Ali is a member of the Provincial Assembly of Khyber Pakhtunkhwa from PK 28 constituency since 2002 and was the Irrigation Minister of Khyber Pakhtunkhwa during the period of Muttahida Majlis-e-Amal government from 2002 till 2008.
- Rahim Khan was Nazim from UC Kohi Barmol during 2005-2010
- Hafiz Saleem is now the member of tehsil council.

Pushto culture in the village, there are many poets here which is improving Pashto Adab and culture. These are Razi Kaka, Sher Nawab, Shahid Gul and Muhammed Younas Khan. These are the poets who are working for the promotion of Pashto Adab and culture.

== Education ==
There are two Primary and one High school for boys, one Primary and One High school for girls, four private schools (Muhammad bin Qasim Academy, Islamia Public School, Utmankhail Public School and East Hills Public School) are also participating in growth of kids and education.

Level of education in past few years has increased considerably but due to lake of resources and unavailability of colleges, 85% of the students are forced to take Govt. jobs or start earning to support their families after Secondary School education. An organization of young, educated team, EHSAS is working to strive their best to help the needy students. EHSAS conducted free tuition program for 9th and 10th standard classes in order to help the student in securing good position and so far they are achieving their goal. From 2001 onward, the education rate has increased considerably, this small village produced some good talent who have secured good positions at the college and university level.

== Climate ==
There are four seasons "Spring, Summer, Winter and Autumn". In the winter season, sometime snow falls on the mountains which creates very cold weather and temperature comes down to 0 - 5 °C. Summer season becomes very hot in the month of July and August and temperature goes to 40-45 °C. Spring season is very beautiful. Most of the overseas inhabitants of this village try to come for vacation and enjoy the season in the month of February and March. There are a number of water wells which serve drinking water to the inhabitants of the village. Most of the people come out for walk after Asar Prayer and enjoy the seasons.

== History ==
A team of archaeologists from Abdul Wali Khan University Mardan (AWKUM) has identified an excavation site in Mian Khan village, Katlang Tehsil with the aim to put the area on the world’s archaeological map. During the month-long excavation which began on 2 May 2014, a number of relics, dating back to 190 BC have been discovered, contributing significantly to the archaeological profile of the district.

The Vice Chancellor of Abdul Wali Khan University, Ihsan Ali reiterated that Mardan has been the centre of Gandhara Civilization and traces of 4,000-years-old ancient human civilization have been found in Sangahu (Katlang) which reflects the significance of this region. This, he said on the occasion of interacting with the students and locals of the area, during the excavation led by Abdul Wali Khan University at Mian Khan Kohi Tangi. Gandhara civilization is also known as the cradle of Buddhism by many historians.

== See also ==
- Katlang
- Sangao (Mardan District)
- Babozai
- Mardan
- Mardan District
