= Mohalla Jam-e-shifa =

Mohalla Jam-e-Shifa is located in Peshawar, Khyber Pakhtunkhwa, Pakistan. It is a prominent street of Mattani. The name is derived from a clinic named Jam-e-Shifa of Doctor Jamshed Khan.

== History ==
There was a small lake in the Mohalla Jam-e-Shifa, which about 10 years ago was demolished and a mosque and a Madrasa constructed. The street had few houses in the beginning but by the start of the 21st century it got two markets and most of the houses were refurnished.

== Importance ==
It is situated in the center of Mattani, so it is a link to many other streets, to other villages, to Mattani's main market named as ADDA and to Peshawar City
