= Pirsai =

Coordinates: 34°25′N 72°15′E

Pirsai is a lush green village in the north of Sudhum Rustam valley. The village has many archaeological spots such as Kashmir Smast, Bakhai, Band Obba ruins, and others that were traced back to the Buddhist civilization.

Kashmir Smast is known as one of the oldest Hindu universities. The ruins saw the rise and fall of many civilizations. Pashtangi Khwar is a beautiful picnic spot in the foothills of pirsai village.Pashtangi area is most commonly known for its beautiful stream an attractive summer season spot for the people of the surrounding area.large number of people visit in this place recently years . Sakra, a large mountain, is a very popular hunting spot as well.

Pirsai is a tourist resort that attracts visitors from across the globe, and provides rich opportunities for hunting. It is set in snow-capped mountains with a meandering stream downhill.

The area is also rich in Pakhtoon's cultural values: one hujra and one mosque, where the elders discuss matters of common interest. These places are like two houses of parliament. The entire community shares grief and joy, helps one other, and lives like siblings.

Pirsai is a true model of Pakhtoonwali. You cannot escape anyone without exchanging compliments with him. This shows mutual concern and respect.
