= Iftikhar Ali Mushwani =

Pakistani politician

MPA Iftikhar Ali Mushwani

Member of the Khyber Pakhtunkhwa Assembly
- In office 13 August 2018 – 18 January 2023
- Constituency: PK-54 (Mardan-VII)
- In office 31 May 2013 – 28 May 2018
- Constituency: PK-26 (Mardan-IV)

Personal details
- Born: 18 December 1977 (age 48) Mardan District
- Party: PTI (2013-present)
- Occupation: Politician

Iftikhar Ali Mushwani is a Pakistani politician hailing from Gujar Garhi Mardan District, who had been a member of the Khyber Pakhtunkhwa Assembly, belonging to the Pakistan Tehreek-e-Insaf. He served from May 2013 until May 2018 and again from August 2018 till January 2023. He also served as chairman and member of the different committees.

== Political career ==
Iftikhar was elected as the member of the Khyber Pakhtunkhwa Assembly from PK-54(Mardan-VII) in the 2013 Pakistani general election on ticket of Pakistan Tehreek-e-Insaf.
