= Tazagram =

Village in Khyber Pakhtunkhwa, Pakistan

Tazagram in Pashto تازه ګرام is a village of Katlang tehsil, Mardan District, Khyber Pakhtunkhwa, Pakistan. The village has a population of nearly 2,000.
