= Dara Utmankhel =

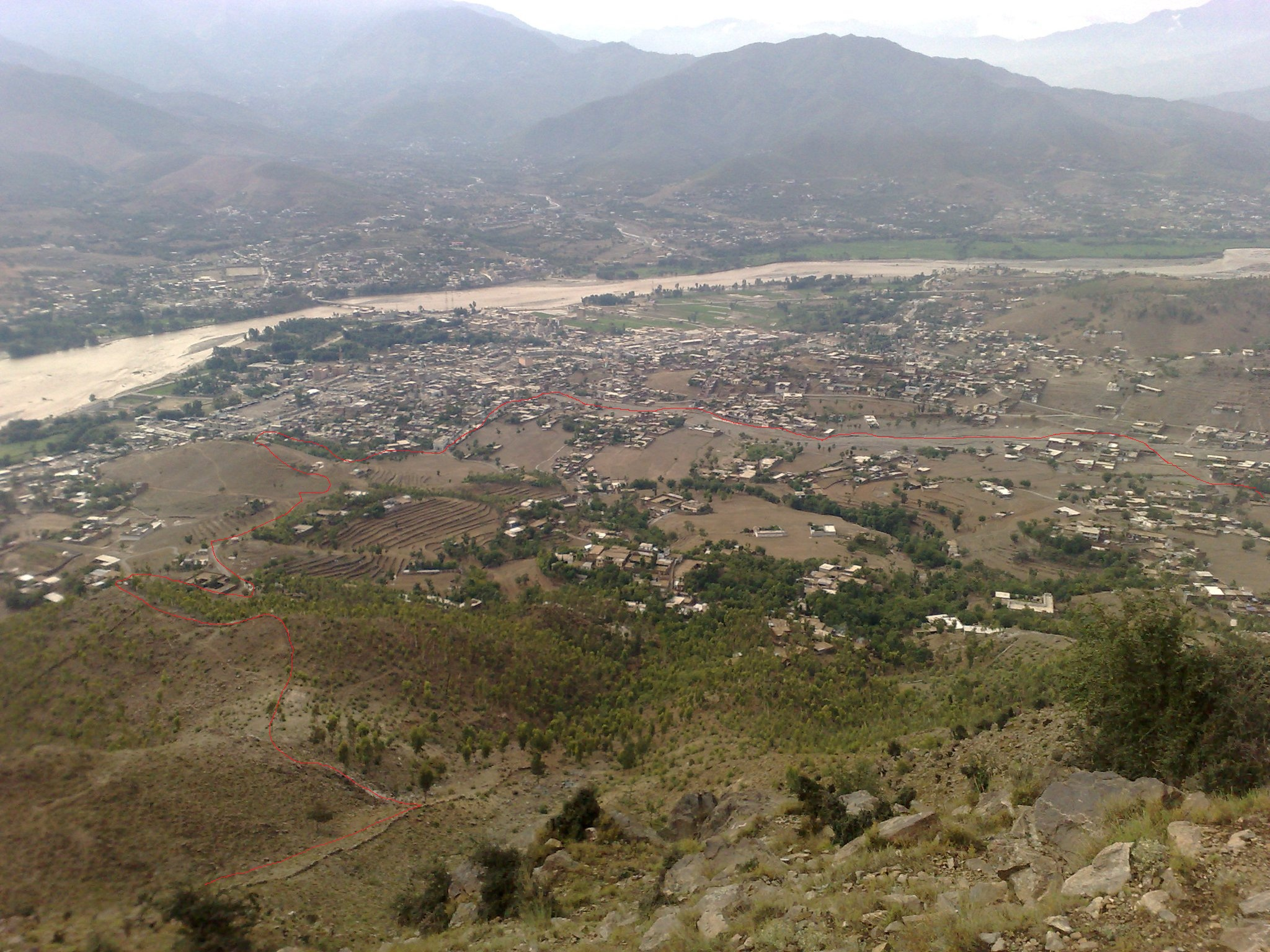
Dara Utmankhel

Dara Utmankhel (Pashto: دره اتمان خیل), also known as Shaikhan, is a valley in the Lower Dir District of Khyber Pakhtunkhwa, Pakistan. It consists of nine villages: Maniband ما نی بند, Jabaghi جبګۍ, Zara Doghy زړه ډوګۍ, Kot Koshah کوټ کو شاه, Mandal Korona کورونه ماندل, Kot کوټ, Ghwandy غونډئ, Fazal Abad and Shah Kuronu شاه کو رونه. It lies in Timergara tehsil, east of the main road from Timergara to Dir. The inhabitants of this area belong to the Mandal, a clan of Utmankhel tribe of Pashtuns. The Utmankhel is one of the Karlanri Pashtun or Afghan tribes who appeared in concert with other tribes like Yousafzai and Tarkalani. They first settled in the areas of Malakand, Bajaur and Mohmand. These people were mainly associated with trade as the land was not suitable for agriculture.

== History ==
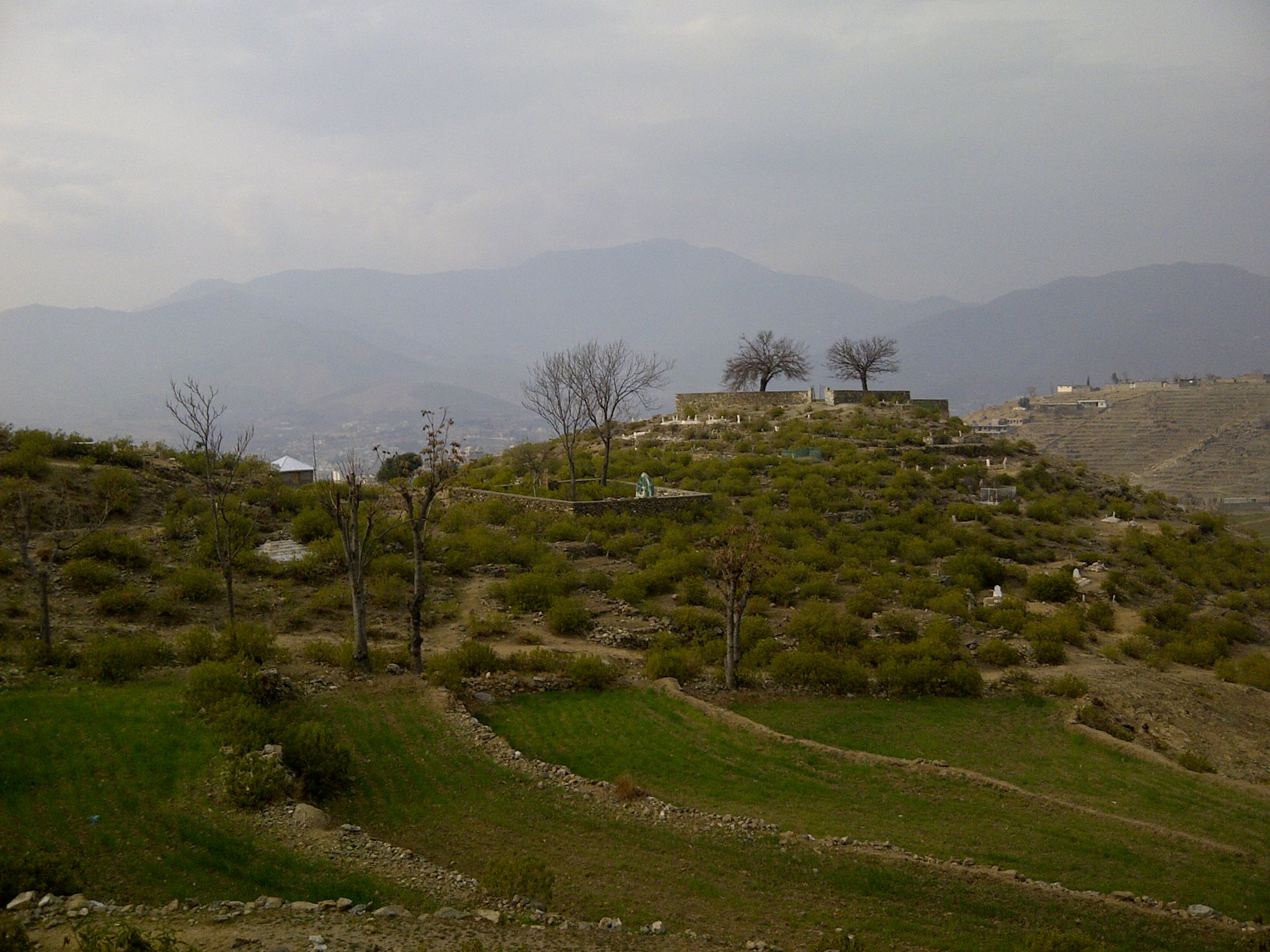
View of graveyard with name of Toar Baba

=== Tor Baba ===
Abdur Rahim Khan and Akhund Ilyas (d.1676 A.D) were the disciples of Shaikh Adam Binori (cf. Mulana Habib Ahmad of Morany, Dir). There are two other tombs in Moranay and Shagokas in Lower Dir that bear the name of Tor Baba. Their descendants in the area have taken the same clan, Mandal (In Afghan genealogies, he is depicted as the elder son of Utman). According to Qazi Abdul Haleem Asar Afghani, the original name of Tor Baba in Moranay village was Muhammad Anwar Baig. It is possible that these three were brothers or belong to the same clan because Tor Baba and Akhund were used as religious titles at that time. For example, the father of Akhund Ilyas was also known as Tor Baba but no one knows his real name.

=== Descendants ===
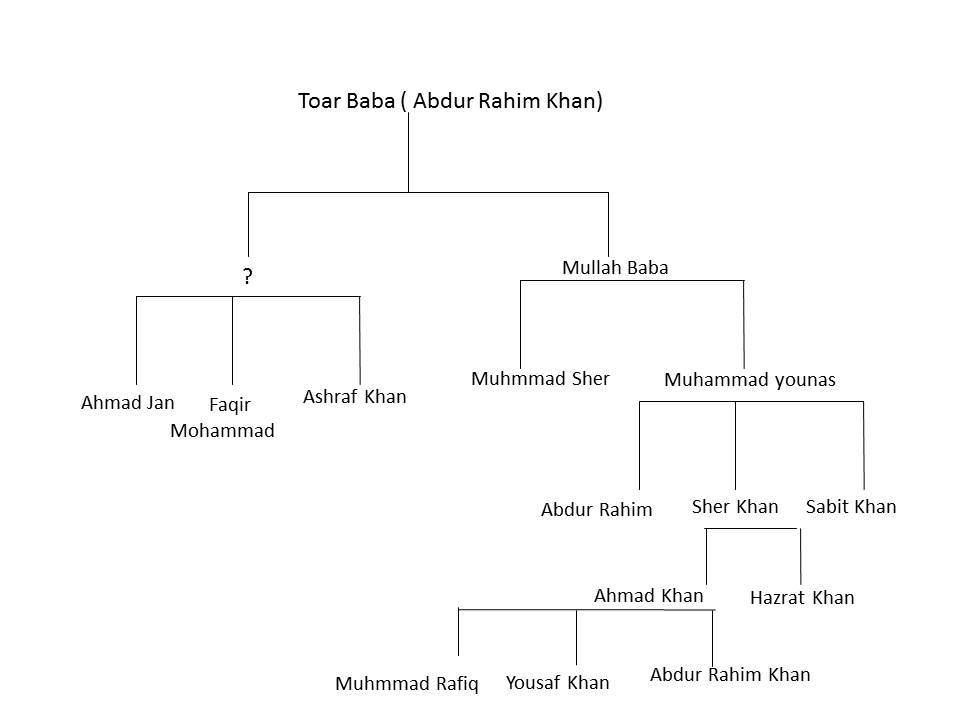
Genealogy of people from Dara Utmankhel

Tor Baba had two sons, Mullah Baba and Islam Jan Baba, whose descendants live in the nearby nine villages. They are also known as Shaikhan, which does not correspond to their ethnicity, but is related to Abdur Rahim Khan, who received this title after becoming a follower of Shaikh Adam Binori.

=== Local dignitaries ===
1. Zaer Mohammad (Associate of Umara Khan during the 1895 conflicts in the Dir region)
2. Shah Wazir Khan (mashar (tribal elder))
3. Jehangir Khan (Naib nazim of the Urban Council, Timergara, under Pakistan’s Local Government System (2001–2004)).

=== Land area, people and economy ===
This narrow, mountainous valley gradually slopes down toward Timergara Bazaar. About 30–35 percent of the area originally belonged to Tor Baba as a serai. His descendants later acquired the remaining land from the Sadat and Ibrahim Khel (Yousafzai) families. According to the 1998 census, the population was approximately 1,400. Agriculture is limited, so many residents depend on employment in the Middle East for their income. Male literacy is relatively high, although educational facilities are limited: the area has five primary schools and no middle or secondary schools.
