= Jhungara =

Village in Pakistan

Jhungara is a small village near Bakhshali in Pakistan.
