= Babini =

Babeni
- Town and union council
- Country: Pakistan
- Region: Khyber Pakhtunkhwa
- District: Mardan District
- Time zone: UTC+5 (PST)

Babeni is a village and union council of Mardan District in the Khyber Pakhtunkhwa province of Pakistan.

Babeni is about 6–7 km away from the main city of Mardan on swabi one way road near Shahdand Baba R.A

On Mazaar, there is a wide open road northeast that leads to Babeni Village. The Ring Road passes through the Babeni village, representing good luck for village development and prosperity. Fatima-Tu-Zuhra R.A University (one kilometer from Ring Road) and Agricultural University of Mardan (on Babeni road) are nearby, as well. Babeni is among the ancient villages of Mardan like Toru, Shahbazgarha, Amazu Garhe, etc. About 150 years back, there was a massive migration to Babeni from Gadoon, Ghazi and Swat area for cultivated lands and to join the village people, which were famous for their hospitality.
