= Kingergali =

Coordinates: 34°30′41″N 72°14′18″E

Kingar Gali کنګرګلۍ کلے
- Kingar Gali
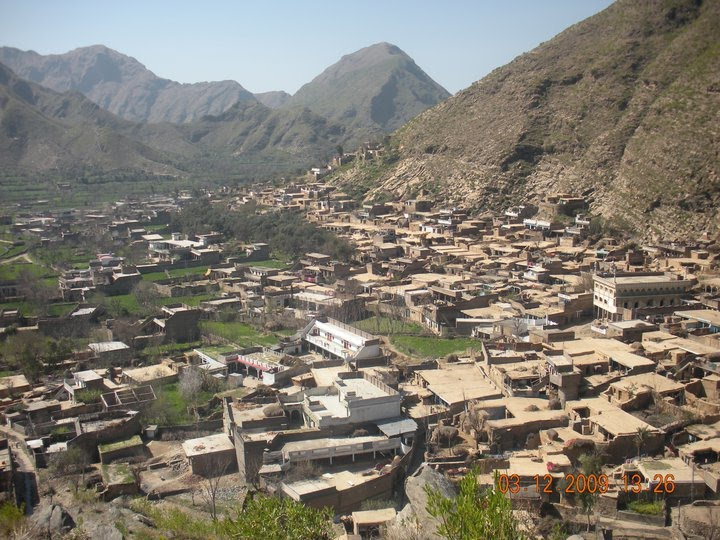
- Interactive map of Kingar Gali کنګرګلۍ کلے
- Country: Pakistan
- Province: Khyber Pakhtunkhwa
- District: Buner District

Dimensions
  - Length: 6 km (3.7 mi)
  - Width: 5 km (3.1 mi)

Population
  - Total: 10,000−15,000

Kingergali is a village in Salarzai, Buner District, Khyber Pakhtunkhwa province, Pakistan. It was part of Yousafzai State of Swat. It was a major center of Buddhist art and culture in ancient times. The area flourished during the Kushan Empire (circa 1st to 3rd centuries CE) and was adorned with Buddhist monasteries, stupas, and sculptures.

== Culture ==
Kinger Gali is an important archaeological site that attracts researchers, historians, and tourists interested in exploring its rich cultural and historical heritage. It is one of the ten villages of Salarzai Tehsil in District Buner, Khyber Pakhtunkhwa, Pakistan.

Nearby Bazdara Village is traditionally associated with the famous Pashtun love story of Adam Khan and Durkhanai. The village is regarded as one of the key locations connected to this legendary tale, making it a place of cultural and historical significance.

Two sub-tribes of Yousafzai inhabitants inhabit Kingergali: Alladad Khail, Daloo Kheil and Kara Khail.

The Alladad Khail community is primarily settled in Kinger Gali, with some families tracing their ancestry to Tonk State, India. The Kara Khail are traditionally divided into four branches: Aziz Khail, Jogi Khail, Mamoot Khel, and Lamghani. In addition to Kinger Gali, members of the Dalo Khel communities are also settled in Charai Kalay, Salarzai. Over time, some families migrated and established themselves in District Shangla.

== Demographics ==
The precise population of Kingergali has not been officially documented. However, according to the unofficial record, its estimated population was approximately 10000–15000.

== Education ==
Kinger Gali has a well-established educational system with both government and private institutions. The government schools in the area include Government Boys Primary School, Government Girls Primary School, Government Boys High School, and Government Girls High School. Private educational institutions, including Faran Model School and Oxford English Grammar School, also provide quality education to local students. In addition, the village is home to religious educational institutions, namely Madrasa Tu Saleheen and Madrasa Dar-e-Ayesha Lil Banat, which offer Islamic education to boys and girls.

== Transport ==
Kinger Gali is connected by three main roads that serve both vehicular traffic and pedestrians: Kinger Gali–Nanser Road, Palai–Buner Road, and Katlang–Buner Road. These routes provide important transportation links between Kinger Gali and neighbouring villages and districts, facilitating travel, trade, and access to essential services.
