= Passani =

Passani پاسنى
- Location within Pakistan
- Coordinates: 33°45′48.61″N 71°35′30.81″E
- Country: Pakistan
- Province: Khyber Pakhtunkhwa
- District: Peshawar District
- Tehsil: Peshawar Tehsil
- Union council: Maryam Zai

Area
  - Total: 3.0 km^{2} (1.2 sq mi)
- Highest elevation: 610 m (2,000 ft)
- Lowest elevation: 457 m (1,499 ft)

Population (1998)
  - Total: 3,000
  - Estimate (2015): 6,000
- Time zone: UTC+5 (PST)
- Calling code: 091

Passani (Urdu: پاسنى) is a village located 33 km south of Peshawar, Khyber Pakhtunkhwa, Pakistan.

== Education ==
The village has three primary schools: one for boys and two for girls, a middle school for boys, and a high school for girls. The literacy rate is 80% for men and 50% for women.

== Economy ==
The main vocations of the population are farming, government jobs and small businesses. Passani is a business hub for the surrounding areas of Adezai, Sherkera, Kandao, Hasankhel, Janakod, Bora, Pastawone, Aratbaba, Yarankhel, and Miaghadi.
