= Babozai =

Pakistani town

Babozai Babuzai
- Town and union council
- Interactive map of Babozai
- Country: Pakistan
- Region: Khyber-Pakhtunkhwa
- District: Mardan District
- Time zone: UTC+5 (PST)

Babozai (often spelled: Babuzai) (Pashto: بابوزئ) is a union council in the Mardan District of Khyber-Pakhtunkhwa.

Babozai (often spelled: Babuzai) (Pashto: بابوزئ) is also a Tehsil in the Swat Vally of Khyber-Pakhtunkhwa.

The river Gadar Khwar flows through Babuzai Tehsil, which is located at an altitude of 1754 metres (5757 feet).

The predominant tribe in both the union council babuzai, Mardan, and Tehsil babuzai, Swat is the sub-branch of Yousuf Zai Pashtun tribe Babuzai which was named after their ancestor Babu. Babu along with his sons fought the Yousufzai battle of Swat and Katlang. They were subsequently settled in both Tehsil and Union Council Babuzai.

== See also ==
- Katlang
- Mian Khan
- Sangao (Mardan District)
- Babuzai
- Mardan
- Mardan District
- Shamozai
