= Bijli Ghar =

Bijli Ghar بجلی گھر
- Location within Pakistan
- Coordinates: 34.1922761°N 72.0282978°E
- Country: Pakistan
- Time zone: UTC+5 (PST)
- Calling code: +92 937

Bijli Ghar (بجلی گھر) (Bijligar) or (Bijlee Ghar) is a densely populated neighbourhood and union council in Mardan District of Khyber Pakhtunkhwa, Pakistan. It is surrounded by canals to the west and the north. Bijli Ghar has a busy market on Nisata road with multiple facilities available.

== Education ==
- Government Girls Primary School Bijli Ghar, Mardan
- Government Middle School Bijli Ghar, Mardan
- Government Primary School Bijli Ghar, Mardan
- Government Girls Middle School Bijli Ghar, MARDAN, Mardan
- Pak Pioneer Model School Bijli Ghar Mardan
- Sher Shah Suri School & College Mardan

== Popular Political Parties ==
- Pakistan Tehreek-e-Insaf
- Awami National Party

== Notable Person ==
- Khursheed Khan (actor)
- Sajjad Khwaraki (cricketer)
