= Tor Dher =

Village in Pakistan

Coordinates: 34°08′N 71°59′E

Tordher (Urdu: تورڈھیر, is a village in Tehsil Lahor, Swabi District of the Khyber Pakhtunkhwa province Pakistan, located 11 km South of Anbar Interchange & 11 Km North of Jahanghera. Its population is 46,320, according to the 2023 census.
