= Chamtar =

Coordinates: 34°14′47″N 71°59′2″E

- Town and union council
- Interactive map of Chamtar
- Country: Pakistan
- Province: Khyber Pakhtunkhwa
- District: Mardan District
- Time zone: UTC+5 (PST)

Chamtar is a town and union council of Mardan District in Khyber Pakhtunkhwa province of Pakistan. It is located at 34°10'47N 71°59'2E and has an altitude of 286 metres (941 feet).
