= Shergarh, Mardan =

Shergarh شير گڑھ
- شېر ګړهـ
- Interactive map of Shergarh
- Country: Pakistan
- Province: Khyber-Pakhtunkhwa
- District: Mardan District

Government
- Time zone: UTC+5 (PST)
- Postal code: 23100

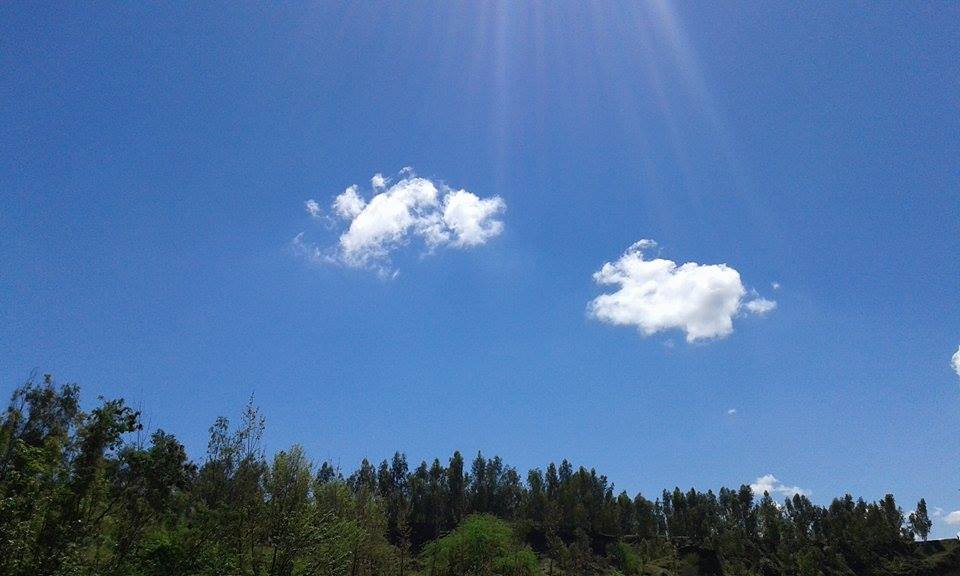
picture taken of treeline from Shergarh

Shergarh (Urdu: شير گڑھ, Pashto: شېر ګړھ) is a town in Takht Bhai tehsil of Mardan District on the edge with Malakand District in Khyber Pakhtunkhwa province of Pakistan. It is located 12 km from Takht Bhai, Khyber Pakhtunkhwa, Pakistan.

== Overview and history ==
The literal meaning of Shergarh both in Urdu and Pashto language is "home of the lions". It falls under the NA-10 seat of the National Assembly's Electoral Process. It lies on the Grand Trunk road in addition to which it divides Mardan District and Malakand agency. To the east of Shergarh, approximately 2km, are the towns of Jarhai, and Hathian—which is the hometown to many politicians. To the West of Shergarh there lies Badragga, Harichand and Qutabgarh.

The town is very old; some historians believe it can be traced back to the 13th century. Its an important point in the trade routes passing between Peshawar and Swat. Under Buddhist rule, a town existed at the same location, but with a Buddhist name. There is a famous Darul Uloom in the town that is named Islamia Arbia Shergarh; it was built in 1951. The founder of this Darolum was Muhtamim Maolana Mohammad Ahmad.

== Location ==
The town is situated on the main highway between Peshawar and Swat. It is about 15 kilometres from the Malakand mountains to the north, 12 km from Lund Khwar and 27 km from Mardan.

== See also ==
- Takht Bhai Tehsil
- Mardan District
