= Muslimabad (Mardan) =

Coordinates: 34°23′0″N 71°54′5″E

- union council
- Interactive map of Muslimabad
- Country: Pakistan
- Province: Khyber-Pakhtunkhwa
- District: Mardan District
- Time zone: UTC+5 (PST)

Muslimabad (Urdu: مسلم آباد) is a village located in Mardan District, Khyber Pakhtunkhwa, Pakistan.
