= Mattani =

Mattani متنی
- Location within Pakistan
- Coordinates: 33°47′40.38″N 71°33′29.20″E
- Country: Pakistan
- Province: Khyber Pakhtunkhwa

Population (2017)
  - Total: 49,000
  - Estimate (2019): 51,000
- Time zone: UTC+5 (PST)
- Calling code: 091
- Number of towns: Mohalla Tokarkhel, Mohalla chajo Khel, Azizkhel, Sheikhan, Gulshanabad, Trukman Khel, Sra Khawra, Jani Ghari

Mattani (Urdu: متنی) is a village on Kohat Road in Peshawar, Khyber Pakhtunkhwa, Pakistan. Mattani is connected with Torkham Border via Frontier Road. The development of Kohat Road and Peshawar Bypass (Frontier Road) has brought economical revolution in Mattani region and also connects the entire Union Council of Tehsil Mattani with Mattani Town.

== Overview ==
Mattani has an important geo-physical, social and economical position among the towns around Kohat. The tribal areas of Darra Adam Khel and Khyber Agency are situated around Mattani.

Due to this geographical importance Mattani is considered to be the centre for all the social, economical and commercial activities of this area and it is the shopping hub for frontier regions like Sherkera, Adezai, Darra Adam Khel, Kala Khel, Passani, and Aka Khel.

== Location ==
Mattani serves as an important road link between Peshawar city and the remote tribal areas: Maryamzai to the north, Sherkera to the south and Bora and Darra Adam Khel to the west. It is also a major link between Peshawar and Kohat.

Mattani Bazar is the main shopping hub of nearby areas, comprising medical stores, vegetable markets, general stores, electronic shops, bakeries and sweet shops, garment shops and automobile repairing centres. It has one Civil Hospital, a 132 KV Grid station and a police station. Before 1996, the Indus Highway passed through Mattani Bazar.

== Administration and Census Information ==
Union Council Mattani 54 is located in ex Town 4 of Peshawar (declared Tehsil of Peshawar district on 2 September 2019), 30 km away from Peshawar. Mattani has 9 and some sub village councils:

1. Toker Khel
2. Aziz khel
3. Gulshan Abad
4. Choju Khel
5. Trukman khel
6. Raees khel
7. Sra Khawra
8. Darwazgai
9. Janai gharai

According to the 2017 census, the local population was reported to be 49,000, with registered voters numbering 17,992 as per the 2017 bye election voter list.

Mattani has a Govt Degree College, Govt High School for Boys, Govt Middle School for Boys, Govt Middle School for Girls, and four High Schools in a private setup.

== See also ==
- Peshawar
- Peshawar District
- Badaber
