= Garhi Abdullakhan =

Garhi Abdulla Khan is a village situated in Thana Bhawan Block of Shamli district. i.e. a Tehsil in Uttar Pradesh, India.

It is located about 50 km kilometres from the Saharanpur and 32 km from district headquarter Shamli. It is located on Thana Bhawan Road. The other name of this village is Mangal ki Garhi.

All communities of this village are living neutrally on the outskirts of this village.

A temple is situated of Lord Shiva known as Shivalaya, in the village."This temple is around 500 years old, making it the oldest one in the village."

It is an ancient village there are three major religious ancient monuments: An ancient temple Shivalaya dedicated to Lord Shiva, and Jain Temple of British Period dedicated to Lord Mahaveer Swami. There is the first Navagraha Temple of District Shamli known as Shani Dev Dham. It is located on Titron Road. There is a two km belt of Mango trees towards the Titron Road.

The village has an old Eidgah used for Eid prayers by residents of Garhi Abdullah Khan and nearby villagers. A pond locally is located near the Eidgah. The site also includes mature neem trees that form part of the surrounding landscape.

Major Schools And Colleges in the area: Prakash memorial public school affiliates to UP Board, Chaudhary Dhiraj Singh Intermediate College affiliated to UP Board Allahabad. SDS Public School affiliated to up board . It is now a small town but it is under Gram Panchayat.

Nearest Airport: IGI Airport New Delhi (130 km) Nearest Railway Station: Thanabhawan Town (12 km)- Rural Nearest Major Railway Station: Shamli(32 km), Saharanpur(45 km), Karnal (46 km), Muzaffarnagar (45 km)
