= Bala Garhi =

Coordinates: 34°14′0″N 72°9′0″E

- Town and union council
- Interactive map of Bala Garhi
- Country: Pakistan
- Province: Khyber Pakhtunkhwa
- District: Mardan District
- Time zone: UTC+5 (PST)

Bala Garhi is a town and union council of Mardan District in Khyber Pakhtunkhwa province of Pakistan. It is located at 34°14'0N 72°9'0E and has an altitude of 302 metres (994 feet).
