= Matani monastery =

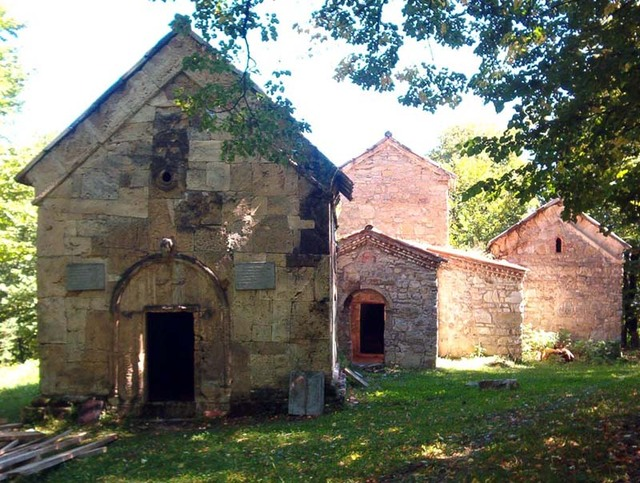
- The Matani Monastery

- Location within Kakheti Location within Georgia

Religion
- Affiliation: Georgian Orthodox Church

Location
- Location: (Georgia (country)) Akhmeta Municipality, Georgia
- Interactive map of Matani monastery
- Coordinates: 42°05′19″N 45°09′11″E

Architecture
- Type: Monastery, church, castle
- Style: Georgian

The Matani monastery (Georgian: მატნის ცხრაკარას მონასტერი) is part of a complex of buildings in the mountains 3–5 km west of the town of Matani in the Akhmeta district of the Kakheti region, Georgia. The monastery of Matani belongs to the Diocese of Alaverdi, although it does not remain active.

== Architecture ==
The monastery complex consists of several churches and other monastic buildings that are surrounded by a low enclosure. The main building of the monastery is a rectangular basilica (10X8.7 m), consisting of three naves, it was built from the 5th to the 6th century in carved stone. In the 8th and 9th centuries, two churches of a single nave of smaller size were built. These buildings are attached to the north and west walls of the main church.

In the fifteenth century, a bell tower was built in the monastery. During this time, the walls of the main church were painted with fresco painting, which has been partially maintained. To the west of the main basilica, there is still a small church from the late Middle Ages.

The main building of the monastery was built from the middle of the 5th century. It is rectangular (10X8.7 m), built in cobblestones and small stone. Some of the basic construction parts are stone spun with yellowish tones. In the eastern part, it has an apse whose axial sliding is cut. Inside the altar of the altar, the wall is constructed with a rectangular trapezoid. In the VIII-IX centuries, the eastern part of the longitudinal walls of the upper half and part of the chambers were restored. The cruise of the north is without substantial changes, at the edge of this cruise is a staircase that leads to an exterior door that is covered with a semi arched arch.

== Gallery ==
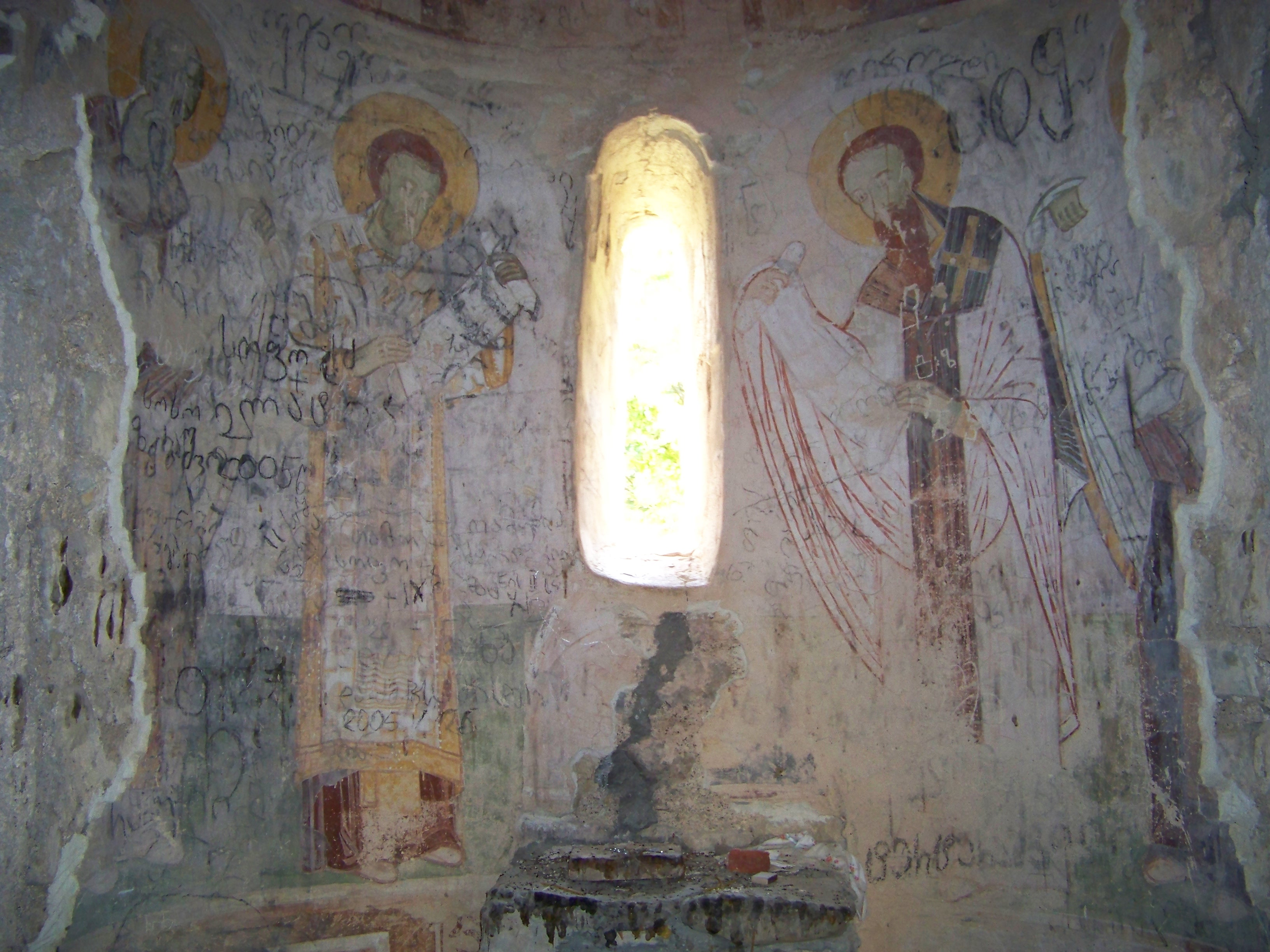
Painting of the altar.

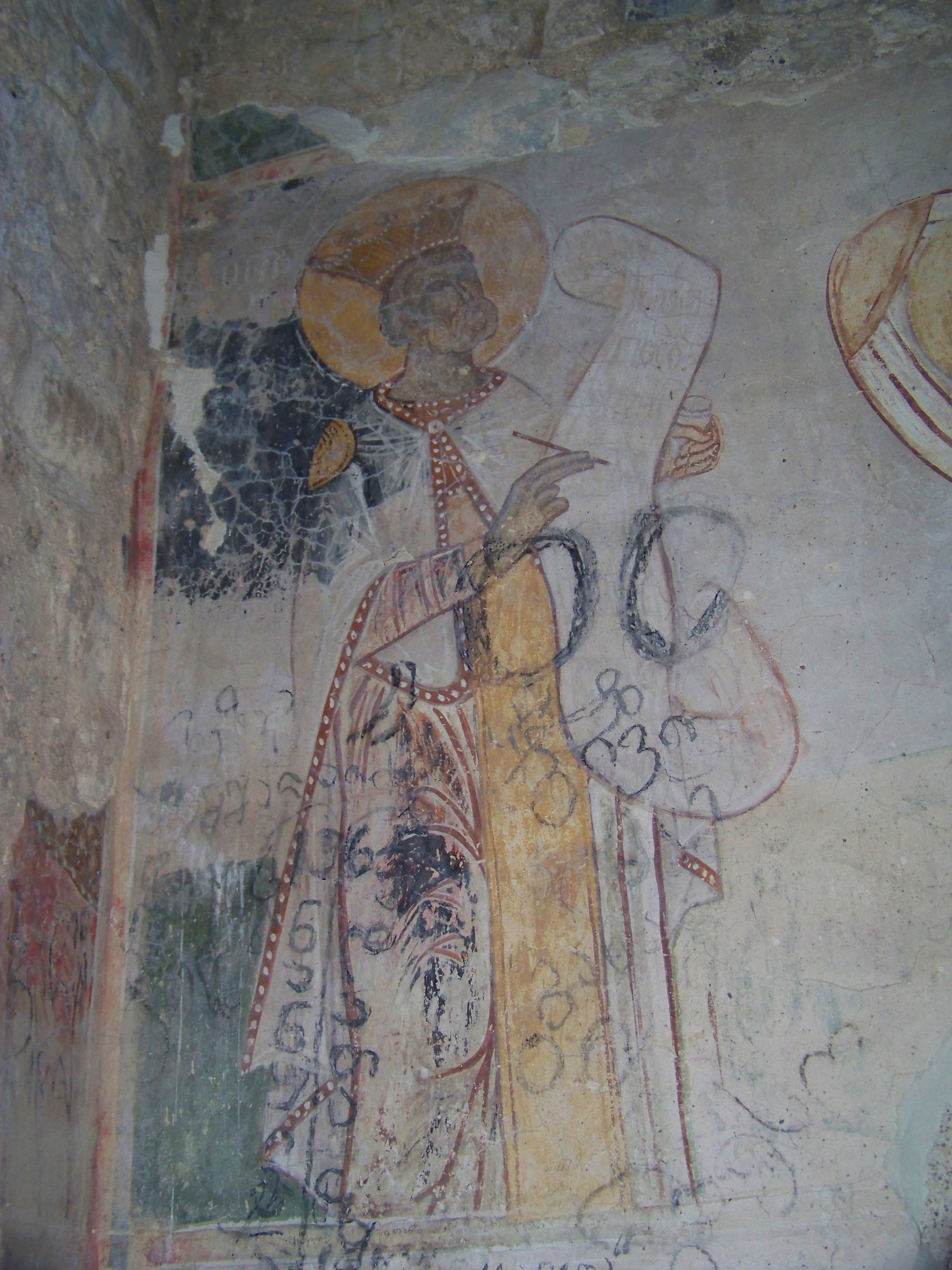
Western wall painting.

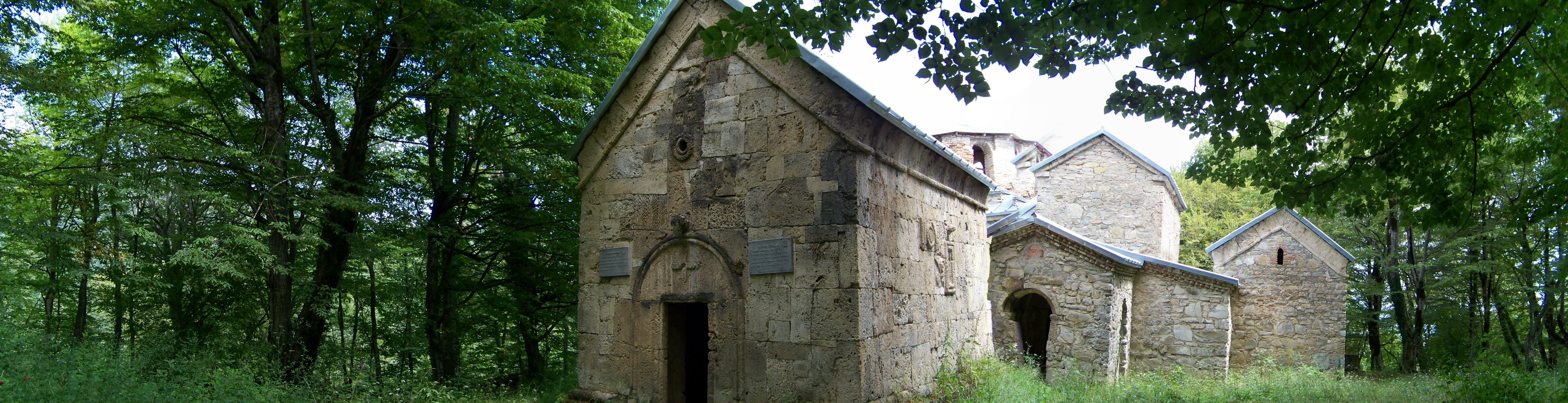
Panorama of Matani
