= Garhi Matani =

- Village
- Location within Pakistan
- Coordinates: 33°55′47″N 72°20′19″E
- Country: Pakistan
- Province: Punjab
- District: Attock
- Tehsil: Hazro
- Region: Chhachh
- Time zone: UTC+5 (PST)

Ghari Matani is a village in Hazro Tehsil of Attock District in Punjab province of Pakistan. It is situated to the south of the Indus River in Chach Valley and has fertile land.
