= Garhi Daulatzai =

Coordinates: 34°12′0″N 72°10′0″E

- Town and union council
- Interactive map of Garhi Daulatzai
- Country: Pakistan
- Province: Khyber Pakhtunkhwa
- District: Mardan District
- Time zone: UTC+5 (PST)

Garhi Daulatzai is a town and union council of Mardan District in Khyber Pakhtunkhwa province of Pakistan. It is located at 34°12'0N 72°10'0E and has an altitude of 294 metres (967 feet).
