= Garhi Ismail Zai =

Coordinates: 34°12′0″N 72°10′0″E

- Town and union council
- Interactive map of Garhi Ismail Zai
- Country: Pakistan
- Province: Khyber-Pakhtunkhwa
- District: Mardan District
- Time zone: UTC+5 (PST)

Garhi Ismail Zai is a town and union council in Mardan District of Khyber-Pakhtunkhwa. It is located at 34°12'0N 72°10'0E and has an altitude of 294 metres (967 feet).
