= Sudhum Rustam =

Coordinates: 34°21′0″N 72°17′0″E

Rustam رستم رستم Sudham Valley
- Town
- Interactive map of Rustam
- Country: Pakistan
- Province: Khyber-Pakhtunkhwa
- District: Mardan District

Government
  - Chairman: Mubarak Ahmad Durrani (JUI(F))

Population
  - Total: 500,000
- Time zone: UTC+5 (PST)
- Area code: +92-937

Rustam is a town of Mardan District in the Khyber-Pakhtunkhwa Province of Pakistan. It is the capital of Rustam Tehsil and is located at 34°21'0N 72°17'0E with an altitude of 369m (1213 feet) in the northern part of the district.

In July 2025 the government of Pakistani renamed a hospital and a road in Rustam after Jawad Khan - the 14 year old boy died from head injuries sustained in a car accident however as an organ donor five critically ill patients were helped by the donation of his organs, this led to the boy posthumously becoming a hero and bringing the issue of organ donation to national prominence.

Rustam is surrounded by the mountains of chengay baba, shabaz ghara, sar malang and Kashmir smasta. Rustam is famous for its agri products – fruits and vegetables. In education, the Rustam has recently moved forward with the establishments of private sector colleges such as Unicom College of Business Studies and Sudhum Children Academy and College. The Government High Schools for Boys and Girls are well established and many well known social contributors have taken their early education in these schools. Currently, A brand new building is under-construction for the Postgraduate Girls College.
