= Kotki =

Coordinates: 33°28′0″N 71°1′0″E

- Town and union council
- Interactive map of Kotki
- Country: Pakistan
- Province: Khyber Pakhtunkhwa
- District: Hangu District
- Time zone: UTC+5 (PST)

Kotki or Kotki Bala is a town and union council of Hangu District in Khyber Pakhtunkhwa province of Pakistan. It is located at 33°28'0N 71°1'0E and has an altitude of 1011 metres (3320 feet).
