= Gujar Garhi =

District in Khyber Pakhtunkhwa, Pakistan

Coordinates: 34°14′0″N 72°1′0″E

- Town and union council
- Interactive map of Gujar Garhi
- Country: Pakistan
- Region: Khyber Pakhtunkhwa
- District: Mardan District

Population (2017 census)
  - Total: 40,817
- Time zone: UTC+5 (PST)

Gujar Garhi, or Gujjar Ghari (lit. 'town of Gujars') is a town and a union council in Takht Bhai Tehsil, Mardan District of Khyber Pakhtunkhwa. It is located at 34°14'0N 72°1'0E and has an altitude of 298m (980 feet).

Main ethnic group in "Gujar Garhi" are the Gujjars who are believed to be the oldest inhabitants and came with White Huns to this area.
