= Katlang Tehsil =

Administrative area in Khyber Pakhtunkhwa, Pakistan

Coordinates: 34°21′N 72°05′E

== Overview ==
Katlang Tehsil تحصیل کاٹلنگ کاټلنګ تحصیل
- Tehsil
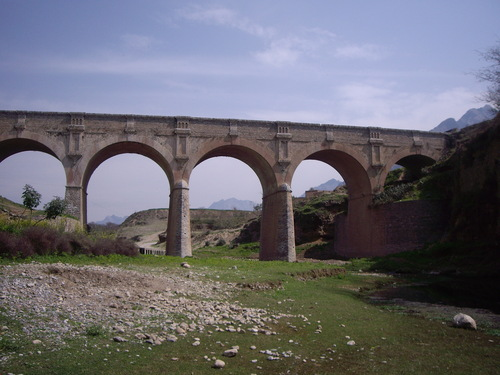
- Interactive map of Katlang Tehsil
- Country: Pakistan
- Province: Khyber Pakhtunkhwa
- District: Mardan

Government
  - Chairman: Muhammad Riaz (IND (Note: Officially affiliated with the PTI, but filed nomination papers as an independent due to the PTI intra-party elections case))

Population
  - Total: 343,144

Katlang (Pashto: کاټلنګ pronounced, Urdu: کاٹلنگ pronounced) is a tehsil in the Mardan District of Khyber Pakhtunkhwa, Pakistan.It is located 19 km (12 mi) north of Mardan and had a population of 377,535 as of the 2023 census.

== Geography and Administration ==
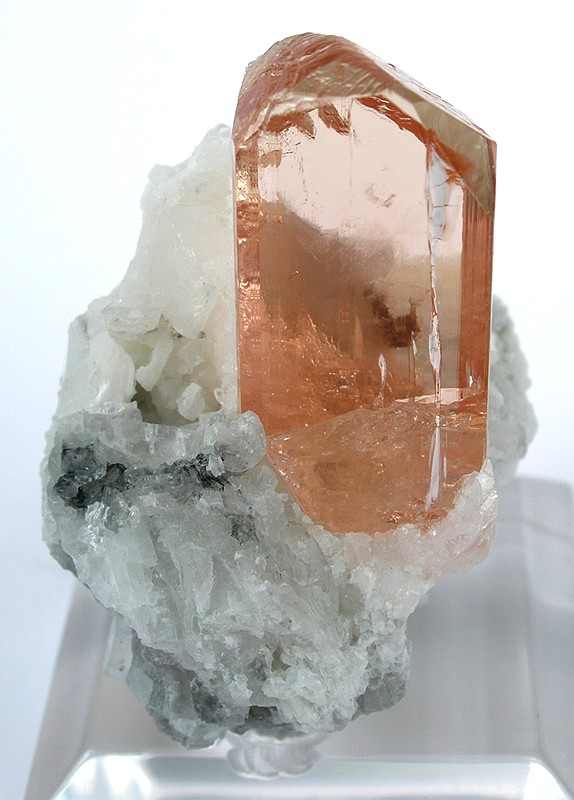
Katlang Topaz

Katlang is one of the administrative subdivisions of Mardan District. It comprises several villages and towns, contributing to the region’s agricultural and economic activities.

== Natural Resources ==
Katlang is often considered notable for its deposits of pink topaz, with estimated reserves ranging from 70,000 to 9,000,000 carats. These gemstones, along with Mingora emeralds, are considered valuable, with some selling at prices exceeding 20,000 rupees per carat.

== See also ==
- Mian Khan
- Sangao (Mardan District)
- Babozai
- Kohi Barmol
