= Babuzai (Pashtun tribe) =

Pashtun tribe

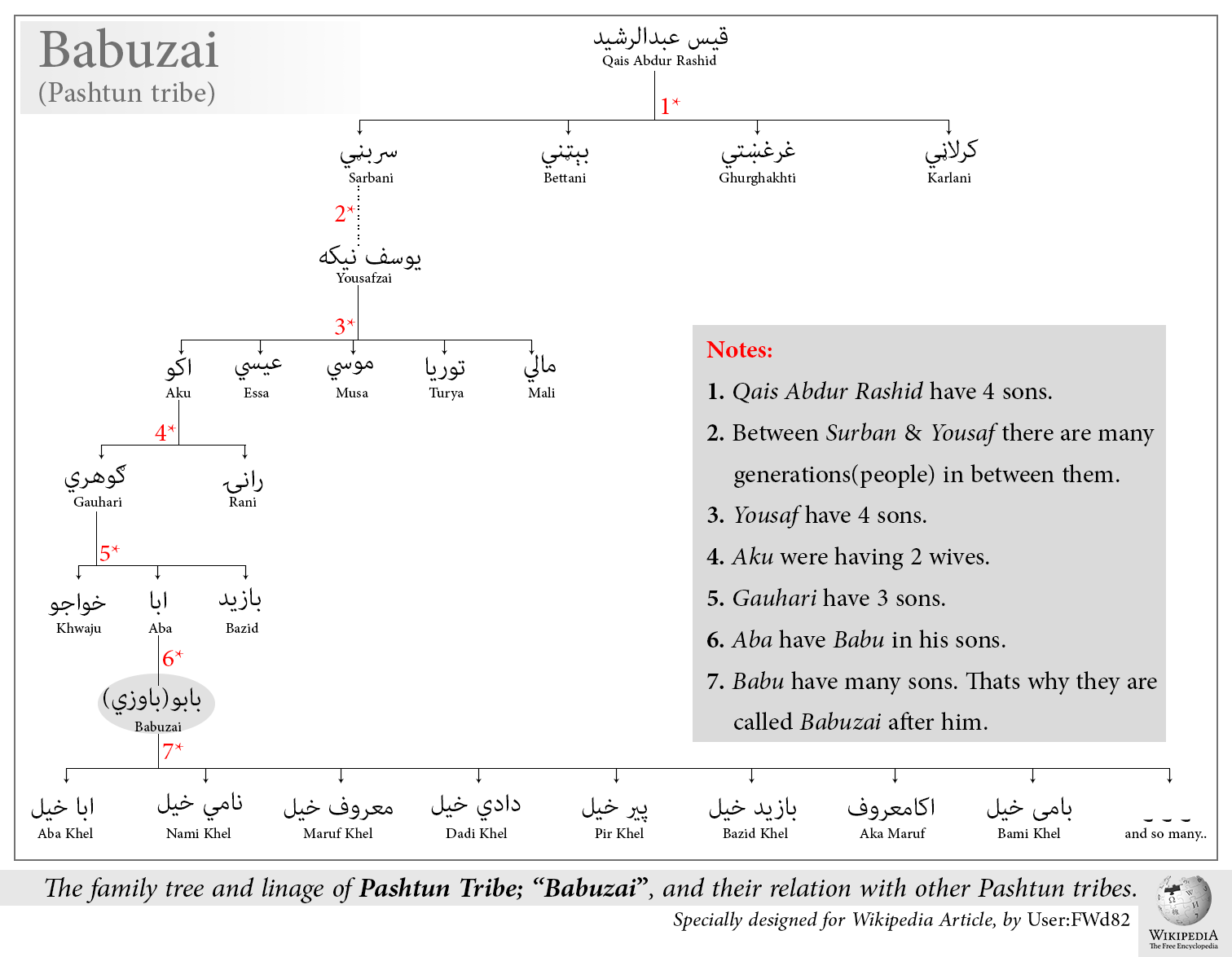
Maroof khail Tribe Babuzai.

Babuzai (also spelled: Babozai) (Pashto: بابوزي) is a Pashtun tribe, and a subtribe of the Yousafzai tribe.

== History ==
Babuzai is named after Babu (often called "Baizai"). There is a tradition among Pashtuns that they name the tribe after the name of that person from whom the clan or tribe has been initiated, the descendants are named after their first ancestor. For instance, Babu is the name of a person, his descendants until now are called Babuzai.

== See also ==
- Khalil (Pashtun tribe)
- Qais Abdur Rashid
