= Sangao (Mardan District) =

Pakistani village

Coordinates: 34°28′N 72°10′E

Sangao is a small village at the North West end of the Katlang area of District Mardan (North West Frontier Province, Khyber Pakhtunkhwa). Its population is unknown but certainly very small. Towards the North East of the village there is a series of mountains arranged in a half circle. In the southern region of Sangao lies another village called Babozai. The next door neighbor of the South West border is the Mian Khan village. These villages are so close that often people call them all by one name: Mian Khan-Sangao. Caves lie in the mountains of Sangao that contain ancient history. However, these caves have yet to be explored and are therefore of special interest to historians, explorers, and adventurers. Recently a new road has been constructed linking Sangao to Buner District. The road runs through the mountains of the village.

== Administrative Division ==
The village of Sangao is further divided into the following tribes: Administrative Division: three 1-Sarbadal khail 2-Tawass khail 3-Jogi khail, 4-(1, Bar Badoo khail, 2 kooz Badoo khail), 3 kankar khail (Sara hujra), 4 Saleem Khan khail, 5 Fayinda khail/Shekhan, 6 Shahmizai khail)

- Tawass khail, Division, 1 Madi khail, 2 Dawood khail, 3 Azit khail
- Jogi khail, Division (1 kooz jogi khail, 2 bar jogi khail, 3 Jalal khail, 4 Adrali khail, 5 Akhtar khail, 6 Hussan khail(Lakhti Hujra,
- Sarbadal khail
- Tawass khail
- Jogi khail

== Etymology ==
" Sangao is a Sanskrit word which means Army Headquarters. This place was serving as headquarters of Army during Gandhara civilization. Locals found thousands of Gautama Buddha statues while digging. Most of those precious statues were stolen by British invaders during British Raj and placed in the British Museum in London. Some were placed in Peshawar Museum.

== Demographics ==
Residents of Sangao are religious. The literacy rate is 45%. The village has four schools, no health clinic, and no pharmacy but there are civilian doctors. The population is around 8,000.

== See also ==
- Katlang
- Mian Khan
- Babozai
- Mardan
- Mardan District
