= Lund Khwar =

Lund Khwar Lundkhwar
- Town and union council
- Interactive map of Lund Khwar
- Coordinates: 34°23′22″N 71°58′51″E
- Country: Pakistan
- Region: Khyber Pakhtunkhwa Province
- District: Mardan
- Tehsil: Takht Bhai
- Elevation: 371 m (1,217 ft)
- Time zone: UTC+5 (PST)
- Area code: 937

Location of Mardan District (highlighted in yellow) within the Khyber-Pakhtunkhwa. The city of Mardan is located in the south west of the district.

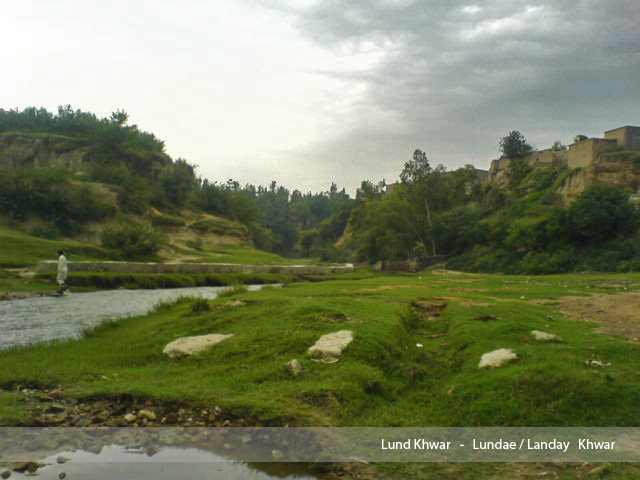
Landae / Landay Khwar, in Lund Khwar.

Lund Khwar, also Lundkhwar (Pashto: لوند خوړ) | Urdu: لوندخوڑ) and pronounced "/Lu:/+/nd/, /Kh/+/va'/+/r:/" is a historical village and union council of Takht Bhai Tehsil in Mardan District of Khyber-Pakhtunkhwa, Pakistan. It is located at 34°23'22 N 71°58'51 E, with an altitude of 371 metres (1220 feet). The name "Lund Khwar" literally means "the ever-flowing stream or brook". Origins of the founding of Lund Khwar are shrouded in mystery. Archaeological and historical evidences indicate the nook point towards the Gandharan era. Earliest written accounts of the village trace it back to 8th century, with the arrival of the Dilazak tribesmen and in 15th century, by the Khattak tribesmen of the Afghans. Currently, it is a major town near the entrance to the Malakand mountains. Alternatively, there is also a Lund Khwar in the Paktika Province of Afghanistan.

== History ==
=== Ancient history ===
Lund Khwar has historically been an important town due to its geography. During the Gandharan era (2nd century BCE), it had been a visiting sanctuary for Buddhist Monks from their nearby strongholds at Takht Bhai. Many archaeological sites have thus been discovered. Even before the Buddhist times, it was a major cattle and herd breeding area. Archeological and Historical clues point towards these conclusions. The armies of Alexander the Great reached the Indus Valley by two separate routes, one through the Khyber Pass and the other led by Alexander himself through Kunar, Bajaur, Swat, and Buner in 326 BCE. After Alexander's death, the valley came under the rule of Chandragupta, who ruled the valley from 297 to 321 BCE. During the reign of the Buddhist emperor Ashoka (the grandson of Chandragupta), Buddhism became the religion of the Peshawar Valley. The valley saw the revival of Brahmanism after the Greeks took over in the time of King Mehanda. The Scythians and Indians followed and retained control of the valley till the 7th century CE.

=== Arrival of the Afghans ===
By the 8th century, the Afghan Dilazaks had appeared in the valley. At that time, the Peshawar valley was under control of the rulers at Lahore. The Afghans joined the Gakkhars who held the country between the Indus and the Jhelum rivers and compelled the Lahore rulers to cede to them; the hill country west of the Indus and south of the Kabul River. The Yousafzai conquered much of what was called Samah, in the olden days, from the Dilazak. After Yousafzai Afghans, the next major tribe was the Khattaks, who settled here in the 15th century. In the time of their great chieftain, Malik Ako, who moved the capital of the Khattak Tribe from Teri (a village in Karak District) to Sarai Akora, the town which Akoray founded and built.

=== Ghaznavid era ===
In the 10th century, the area came under the control of Sultan Sabuktigin who defeated Raja Jaipal, the Hindu ruler of Lahore. Sabuktgin's son Sultan Mahmud of Ghazni made this area the rallying point for his numerous raids into the interior of India. In the 12th century, the Persians of Ghor (Ghurids) overthrew the Ghaznavis and the era of Ghaznavis came to an end.

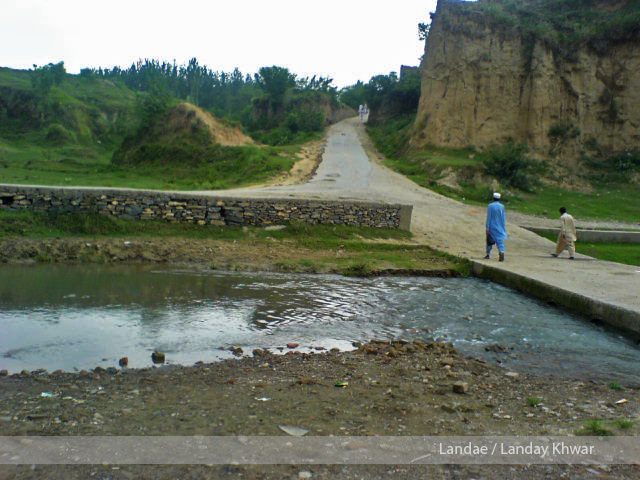
The Stream Landae/Landay Khwar, in Lund Khwar

=== Mughal era ===
In 1505 the Mughal emperor Babar invaded the area through Khyber Pass.

=== Valley of the Latter Day Saints (Ulema) ===
Lund Khwar has always been rich in its Islamic tradition and heritage of knowledge. Not only have many Lund Khwarians been great Ulema, graduating in great numbers from great institutions like Deoband and Saint Abdul Ali, but Lund Khwar has also served as a home for many famous saints, Ghazi and Ulema. Such famous names include Saint Syed Abdul Wahab Akhun Panju Baba, Syed Ismail Shaheed Barelvi, Shah Ismail Shaheed and Haji Sahib of Rashakai, great-great-grandson of Sadar Khan. The people of the village contributed to the liberation of India in the 19th century by joining Syed Ahmad Shaheed Barelvi.

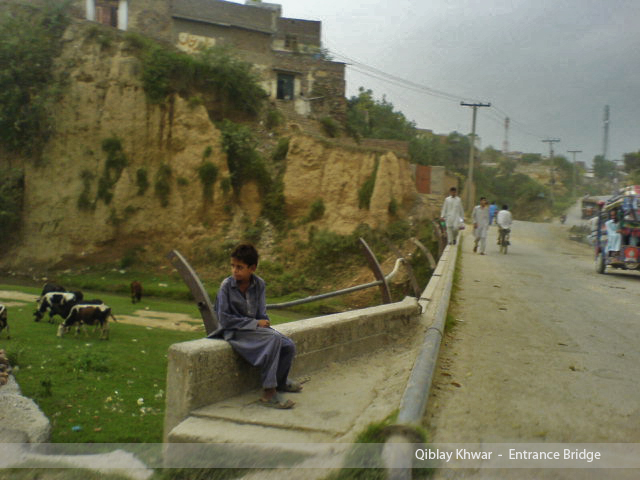
A sight from one of the entrance bridges, in Lund Khwar

=== Role in the Pakistan Freedom Movement ===
The Khans of the town grew famous because of their early involvement in politics (Khan Ghulam Muhammad Khan Lundkhwar ) had a great name in the politics of the sub-continent. This was brought about when the Khans grew rich from trade with the far reaches of India as far as Calcutta. In the late 19th century, political thought had grown to a point where it became necessary for the English Imperialists to permanently station their troops here. This was justified on the basis that religious leaders and freedom fighters from the village joined forces against the English. With such a background, the English became main streams and a smaller brook from three directions which flow throughout the year, thus lending Lund Khwar its name as well as a safety against possible invaders, a strategic point and basis for its foundation. The town is connected with Sher Garh through a main road which reaches the town through a bridge on the stream.

In his book The Pathan Unarmed: opposition & memory in the North West Frontier, Mukulika Banerjee writes:

"A Chief Secretary's report from 193 stated that:

In and around Lund Khwar... increase in the active participation of women. On 30 April...15 women volunteers paraded....in Lund Khwar it was announced that meetings would be held....about two or three thousand at meetings...Speech prepared by Abdul Ghaffar Khan read out by a boy and resolutions passed that, if permanent peace was not concluded, the women should join the men in future struggle, that khaddar [khadi cloth] only should be worn by the women and that the full rights of women under the shari'a should be conceded to them by men."

Note on the reference: The name of the boy who read out the speech was Qasim Khan, the son of a woman Grana who because of the purdah could not participate in the presence of adult male speakers.

"Though not publicly acknowledged, British official correspondence confirms that women picketers were active in Bannu and Lund Khwar. In mobilizing the Pathan women, Khurshedben Naoroji appears to have played an important role as she lived there for some time and worked among the frontier ladies exhorting them to start Swadeshi activities."

=== Current times ===
Lund Khwar is now a union council of the Takht Bhai tehsil of District Mardan. It falls in Constituency PK-55 (Mardan-V) for the Khyber Pakhtunkhwa Assembly of the Khyber Pakhtunkhwa province of Pakistan in the NA-22 seat of the National Assembly's Electoral Process.

== Localities and parts ==
Lund Khwar consists of the main town, once a walled town which had five gates, and its surrounding sub-towns known as "Banda" and barbarity by stripping the men and lashing them, the men were randomly chosen and lashed just to frighten the villagers.

== Location ==
It is located some 18 km from Takht Bahi, 10 km from Sher Garh and about 30 km from Mardan on the National Highway between Swat and Peshawar District. The town is surrounded by two main streams and a smaller brook from 3 directions which flow throughout the year, thus lending Lund Khwar its name as well as a safety against possible invaders, a strategic point and basis for its foundation. The town is connected with Sher Garh through a main road which reaches the town through a bridge on the stream.

== Geology ==
"In Lund Khwar, the surface near the hills is a strong bed of limestone pebbles mixed with boulders of conglomerate".
